= 64th NHK Cup (shogi) =

The 64th NHK Cup, or as it is officially known the 64th NHK Cup TV Shogi Tournament (第64回NHK杯テレビ将棋トーナメント, dairokujūyonkai enueichikeihai terebi shōgi tōnamento) was a professional shogi tournament organized by the Japan Shogi Association and sponsored by Japan's public broadcaster NHK. Play began on April 6, 2014, and ended on March 22, 2015. The 50-player single elimination tournament was won by Toshiyuki Moriuchi. All of the tournament games were shown on NHK-E. The host (司会者, shikaisha) during the NHK-E broadcasts was female professional Ichiyo Shimizu.

== Participants ==
=== Preliminary tournaments ===
A total of 128 shogi professionals competed in 18 preliminary tournaments to qualify for the main tournament. These tournaments were untelevised one-day tournaments held at the Tokyo Shogi Kaikan and Kansai Shogi Kaikan. Each tournament consisted of seven or eight players. The initial time control for each player was 20 minutes followed by a 30-second byōyomi.

The female professional seed was determined by a single-game playoff between Tomomi Kai 2-crown (Women's ōi and Kurashiki Tōka) and Manao Kagawa (Women's ōshō), which was won by Kagawa. Brackets from two of the preliminary tournaments are shown below.

7-player preliminary tournament won by Yasuaki Tsukuda 9d

8-player preliminary tournament won by Hiroshi Kobayashi 7d

=== Main tournament ===
The first time control for main tournament games was ten minutes per player. Once this was used up, a second time control of 10 one-minute periods of "thinking time" (考慮時間, kōryō jikan) began. Each player was given 30 seconds to make their move. If they did so, then no thinking time periods were used. If, however, they did not, a thinking time period began and they then had up to one minute (more specifically 59 seconds) to make a move before entering the next thinking time period. This process was repeated until a player had used all ten thinking time periods when the final byōyomi time control of 30 seconds per move began. Sente was determined prior to each game by piece toss.

The 50 players listed below qualified for the main tournament.

No.	Name	Rank/Title
A1	**Masataka Gōda** (23)	NHK Cup
A2	Kōji Tosa (12)	7d
A3	**Takanori Hashimoto** (10)	8d
A4	**Manao Kagawa** (1)	W3d (Note: "W3d" stands for "Women's professional 3-dan".)
A5	Manabu Kumasaka (1)	5d
A6	Shin'ichi Satō (1)	4d
A7	**Mamoru Hatakeyama** (17)	7d
A8	**Kōji Tanigawa** (35)	9d
A9	Hiroshi Kobayashi (9)	7d
A10	**Daisuke Suzuki** (18)	8d
A11	**Kōru Abe** (3)	4d
A12	Kōta Kanai (4)	5d
A13	**Toshiaki Kubo** (19)	9d
A14	**Hisashi Namekata** (18)	8d
A15	Shingo Sawada (2)	5d
A16	**Takuya Nagase** (4)	6d
A17	**Takeshi Fujii** (20)	9d
A18	Hiromu Watanabe (1)	4d
A19	**Yasumitsu Satō** (26)	9d
A20	**Akira Watanabe** (13)	2 crown
A21	Takashi Abe (20)	8d
A22	**Yūki Sasaki** (2)	4d
A23	**Akira Inaba** (2)	7d
A24	Kōsuke Tamura (10)	7d
A25	**Tadashi Ōishi** (4)	6d

No.	Name	Rank/Title
B1	**Tadahisa Maruyama** (24)	9d
B2	Ryōsuke Nakamura (2)	5d
B3	**Ayumu Matsuo** (11)	7d
B4	**Chikara Akutsu** (10)	8d
B5	Yūji Masuda (4)	6d
B6	Issei Takazaki (4)	6d
B7	**Tatsuya Sugai** (3)	5d
B8	**Yoshiharu Habu** (29)	3 crown
B9	Takeshi Kawakami (6)	6d
B10	**Michio Takahashi** (34)	9d
B11	**Kazuki Kimura** (16)	8d
B12	Amahiko Satō (6)	7d
B13	**Toshiyuki Moriuchi** (26)	2 crown
B14	**Hiroyuki Miura** (19)	9d
B15	Kensuke Kitahama (14)	8d
B16	**Masayuki Toyoshima** (6)	7d
B17	**Akihito Hirose** (8)	8d
B18	Taku Morishita (24)	9d
B19	**Kōichi Fukaura** (22)	9d
B20	**Nobuyuki Yashiki** (18)	9d
B21	Kōzō Arimori (4)	6d
B22	**Takayuki Yamasaki** (14)	8d
B23	**Hiroki Iizuka** (6)	7d
B24	Yasuaki Tsukada (22)	9d
B25	**Kazuhiro Nishikawa** (3)	4d

Notes:

- "No." represents the bracket position of the player in their respective block and "Rank/Title" represents the rank or titles held by the player when the original bracket finalized. A dan/ grading system is used for ranking players. The number in parentheses after each player's name represents the number of times said player has appeared in the main tournament.
- Players whose names are in bold were seeded directly into the main tournament as follows: (Note: Players overlapping multiple categories are only listed once.)
1. 63rd NHK Cup (four players): Gōda (champion), Maruyama (runner-up), Ōishi (semifinalist) and Nishikawa (semifinalist).
2. Seven major titleholders (three players): Moriuchi (Meijin and Ryūō), Habu (ōza, ōi, and Kisei), Watanabe (Kiō and ōshō)
3. Class A (seven players): Miura, Yashiki, Y. Satō, Fukaura, Tanigawa, Namekata and Kubo
4. Class B1 (twelve players): Takahashi, Hashimoto, Yamasaki, Matsuo, Kimura, Hatakeyama, Hirose, Akutsu, Suzuki, Iizuka, Fujii and Toyoshima
5. Other tournament winners (two players): Inaba (Ginga-sen), Sasaki (Kakogawa Seiryū-sen)
6. Women's professional (one player): Kagawa (Women's ōshō)
7. Others with outstanding records (three players): Sugai (Class C1), Nagase (Class C2) and K. Abe (Class C2) (Note: Based upon JSA 2013 calendar year rankings in the following three categories: games played, games won, and winning percentage.)

Among these 32 seeds, the following 14 were given byes in round 1 and began play in round 2: Gōda, Maruyama, Ōishi, Nishikawa, Moriuchi, Habu, Watanabe, Miura, Yashiki, Y. Satō, Fukaura, Tanigawa, Namekata and Kubo.

- The remaining players qualified by winning preliminary tournaments.

The bracket at the start of the tournament is shown below.

64th NHK Cup TV Shogi Tournament bracket (start)

== Results ==
=== Round 1 ===
A total of 18 games were played in round 1. Play began on April 6, 2014, and ended on August 3, 2014. The 18 preliminary tournament winners were paired against 18 seeded players. Out of the four players who qualified for the main tournament for the first time, only Manabu Kumasaka was able to make it to the second round. Namekata and Sawada actually had to play two games before a winner was determined. The first game between the two lasted more than two hours before ending in impasse after 252 moves. A second game with sente-gote reversed was then played at a time control of 5 one-minute "thinking periods" followed by a byōyomi of 30 seconds per move and Namekata won in 88 moves.

No.	Block	Sente	Gote (Note: Gote (後手) refers to "the player who moves second".)	No. of moves	Date	Guest Analyst
1	B	Ayumu Matsuo 7d	Ryōsuke Nakamura 5d	101	April 6, 2014	Masataka Gōda NHK Cup
2	A	Kōsuke Tamura 7d	Akira Inaba 7d	100	April 13, 2014	Isao Nakata 7d
3	A	Kōta Kanai 5d	Kōru Abe 4d	223	April 20, 2014	Yasuaki Murayama 7d
4	B	Michio Takahashi 9d	Takeshi Kawakami 6d	103	April 27, 2014	Hisashi Namekata 8d
5	A	Takuya Nagase 6d	Shingo Sawada 5d	104	May 4, 2014	Tadashi Ōishi 6d
6	A	Yūki Sasaki 5d (Note: Sasaki was promoted to 5d on March 11, 2014.)	Takashi Abe 8d	123	May 11, 2014	Manabu Senzaki 9d
7	B	Takayuki Yamasaki 8d	Kōzō Arimori 6d	91	May 18, 2014	Keita Inoue 9d
8	A	Hiromu Watanabe 4d	Takeshi Fujii 9d	160	May 25, 2014	Kazuo Ishida 9d
9	B	Hiroki Iizuka 7d	Yasuaki Tsukuda 9d	97	June 1, 2014	Taku Morishita 9d
10	A	Kōji Tosa 7d	Takanori Hashimoto 8d	108	June 8, 2014	Daisuke Nakagawa 8d
11	A	Hiroshi Kobayashi 7d	Daisuke Suzuki 8d	165	June 15, 2014	Takashi Abe 8d
12	B	Akihito Hirose 8d	Taku Morishita 9d	114	June 22, 2014	Chikara Akutsu 8d
13	B	Tatsuya Sugai 5d	Issei Takazaki 6d	103	June 29, 2014	Makoto Tobe 6d
14	B	Yūji Masuda 6d	Chikara Akutsu 8d	87	July 6, 2014	Takayuki Yamasaki 8d
15	B	Masayuki Toyoshima 7d	Kensuke Kitahama 8d	73	July 13, 2014	Mamoru Hatakeyama 7d
16	B	Kazuki Kimura 8d	Amahiko Satō 7d	109	July 20, 2014	Akira Watanabe 2 crown
17	A	Mamoru Hatakeyama 7d	Shinichi Satō 4d	97	July 27, 2014	Takanori Hashimoto 8d
18	A	Manao Kagawa W3d	Manabu Kumasaka 5d	96	August 3, 2014	Osamu Nakamura 9d

=== Round 2 ===
Round 2 began August 10 and lasted until November 23, 2014. A total of 16 games were played with 14 players receiving first round byes joining the nine winners from round 1. For the second year in a row multiple major titleholder Akira Watanabe loses in round 2. Also, for the second year in a row, Kōta Kanai beats Toshiaki Kubo in the round 2. Takeshi Fujii had to play two games against Yasumitsu Satō before a winner was determined. The first game between the two ended in sennichite after 70 moves. A second game with sente-gote reversed was then played with Fujii winning in 121 moves. Hisashi Namekata and Shingo Sawada also needed two games for a winner to be determined. The first game between the two ended in impasse after 252 moves, and Namekata won the replay with sente-gote reversed in 88 moves.

No.	Block	Sente	Gote	No. of moves	Date	Guest Analyst
1	A	Akira Watanabe 2 crown	Yūki Sasaki 5d	156	August 10, 2014	Nobuyuki Yashiki 9d
2	A	Kōta Kanai 5d	Toshiaki Kubo 9d	95	August 17, 2014	Daisuke Suzuki 8d
3	B	Nobuyuki Yashiki 9d	Takayuki Yamasaki 8d	95	August 24, 2014	Kensuke Kitahama 8d
4	A	Tadashi Ōishi 6d	Akira Inaba 7d	151	August 31, 2014	Tetsurō Itodani 6d
5	A	Hisashi Namekata 8d	Shingo Sawada 5d	252	September 7, 2014	Masayuki Toyoshima 7d
5	A	Shingo Sawada 5d	Hisashi Namekata 8d	88	September 7, 2014	Masayuki Toyoshima 7d
6	A	Hiroshi Kobayashi 7d	Kōji Tanigawa 9d	100	September 14, 2014	Takahiro Toyokawa 7d
7	B	Hiroki Iizuka 7d	Kazuhiro Nishikawa 5d (Note: Nishikawa was promoted to 5d on August 21, 2014.)	105	September 21, 2014	Toshiaki Kubo 9d
8	A	Takanori Hashimoto 8d	Masataka Gōda NHK Cup	117	September 28, 2014	Yasumitsu Satō 9d
9	B	Kazuki Kimura 8d	Toshiyuki Moriuchi Ryūō (Note: Moriuchi lost his Meijin title to Habu in May 2014.)	110	October 5, 2014	Kōichi Fukaura 9d
10	A	Yasumitsu Satō 9d	Takeshi Fujii 9d	70	October 12, 2014	Akihito Hirose 8d
10	A	Takeshi Fujii 9d	Yasumitsu Satō 9d	121	October 12, 2014	Akihito Hirose 8d
11	B	Yoshiharu Habu 4 crown	Michio Takahashi 9d	95	October 19, 2014	Hifumi Katō 9d
12	B	Hiroyuki Miura 9d	Masayuki Toyoshima 7d	68	October 26, 2014	Kazuki Kimura 8d
13	B	Tatsuya Sugai 5d	Yūji Masuda 6d	143	November 2, 2014	Kōhei Funae 5d
14	B	Kōichi Fukaura 9d	Taku Morishita 9d	133	November 9, 2014	Akira Shima 9d
15	B	Ayumu Matsuo 7d	Tadahisa Maruyama 9d	100	November 16, 2014	Michio Takahashi 9d
16	A	Mamoru Hatakeyama 7d	Manabu Kumasaka 5d	93	November 23, 2014	Daisuke Nakagawa 8d

=== Round 3 ===
Play began on November 30, 2014, and ended on January 25, 2015. Out of the 18 preliminary tournament winners, only Kanai 5d made it to round 3.

No.	Block	Sente	Gote	No. of moves	width="120"| Date	Guest Analyst
1	B	Yoshiharu Habu 4 crown	Toshiyuki Moriuchi Ryūō	100	November 30, 2014	Takeshi Fujii 9d
2	A	Yūki Sasaki 5d	Tadashi Ōishi	153	December 7, 2014	Taichi Nakamura 6d
3	B	Kōichi Fukaura 9d	Masayuki Toyoshima 7d	135	December 14, 2014	Chikara Akutsu 8d
4	A	Takanori Hashimoto 8d	Mamoru Hatakeyama 7d	111	December 21, 2014	Hisashi Namekata 8d
5	A	Kōji Tanigawa 9d	Kōta Kanai 5d	128	January 4, 2015	Taku Morishita 9d
6	B	Tatsuya Sugai 5d	Tadahisa Maruyama 9d	129	January 11, 2015	Keita Inoue 9d
7	A	Takeshi Fujii 9d	Hisashi Namekata 8d	126	January 18, 2015	Amahiko Satō 8d (Note: Amahiko Satō was promoted from 7d to 8d by the JSA on January 8, 2015)
8	B	Hiroki Iizuka 7d	Nobuyuki Yashiki 9d	123	January 25, 2015	Hirotaka Nozuki 7d

=== Quarterfinals ===
The eight remaining players were paired off against each other with play beginning on February 1 and ending on February 22, 2015. No major titleholders made it as far as the quarterfinals.

No.	Block	Sente	Gote	No. of moves	Date	Guest Analyst
1	A	Yūki Sasaki 5d	Hisashi Namekata 8d	96	February 1, 2015	Yasuaki Murayama 7d
2	B	Toshiyuki Moriuchi 9d (Note: Moriuchi lost his Ryūō title to Testsurō Itodani in December 2014)	Tatsuya Sugai 5d	123	February 8, 2015	Kōji Tanigawa 9d
3	A	Kōta Kanai 5d	Takanori Hashimoto 8d	102	February 15, 2015	Ayumu Matsuo 7d
4	B	Hiroki Iizuka 7d	Kōichi Fukaura 9d	112	February 22, 2015	Osamu Nakamura 9d

=== Semifinals ===
The two remaining players from each block with paired against each other to determine the respective block winners. The 1st semifinal game between Kōichi Fukaura 9d (sente) and Toshiyuki Moriuchi 9d (gote) was broadcast on March 1, 2015. Moriuchi won the game in 166 moves to win block B. The guest analyst was Yaumitsu Satō 9d. The 2nd semifinal game was between Hisashi Namekata 8d (sente) and Takanori Hashimoto 8d (gote). The game was broadcast on March 8, 2015, and won by Namekata 8d when Hashimoto 8d was disqualified for making an illegal move (Nifu) on his 92nd move. Namekata thus won block A and advanced to the finals of the tournament for the first time. The guest analyst for the 2nd semifinal game was Kazuki Kimura 8d. The host for both semifinal games was female professional Rieko Yauchi 5d.

=== Final ===
After 109 preliminary tournament games and 58 main tournament games involving 161 players, Toshiyuki Moriuchi 9d and Hisashi Namekata 9d met in the final broadcast on March 22, 2015. This was the first NHK Cup final appearance for Namekata and the fifth appearance for Moriuchi. The piece toss before the game resulted in Namekata being sente. Moriuchi won the game in 134 moves, thus winning the tournament for the third time and becoming the 64th NHK Cup Champion. The guest analyst for the final match were Takeshi Fujii 9d and the hosts of the final were NHK announcer Ryō Nagano and female professional Ichiyo Shimizu.

The game score and a diagram showing the final position is given below.

64th NHK Cup Final (134. R*5h)
Gote: Toshiyuki Moriuchi 9d
☖ pieces in hand: Pieces-in-hand: 金 銀(2) 歩(6)

9	8	7	6	5	4	3	2	1
馬	桂								1
							銀		2
			歩	歩		金	歩	金	3
歩		歩			歩				4
	歩				銀	香		香	5
歩			香				王		6
	歩	桂	歩	歩	と		桂		7
香			玉	飛					8
							飛		9

☗ pieces in hand: 角 金 桂
Sente: Hisashi Namekata 8d

Sente: Hisashi Namekata 8d
Gote: Toshiyuki Moriuchi 9d
Opening: Bishop Exchange
1. P-7f, 2. P-8d, 3. P-2f, 4. G-3b, 5. G-7h, 6. P-8e, 7. B-7g, 8. P-3d, 9. S-8h, 10. Bx7g+, 11. Sx7g, 12. S-4b, 13. S-3h, 14. S-7b, 15. P-9f, 16. P-9d, 17. P-4f, 18. P-6d, 19. S-4g, 20. S-6c, 21. K-6h, 22. S-5d, 23. S-5f, 24. P-4d, 25. G-5h, 26. G-5b, 27. P-3f, 28. K-4a, 29. P-1f, 30. P-1d, 31. K-7i, 32. K-3a, 33. N-3g, 34. P-7d, 35. P-6f, 36. S-3c, 37. R-4h, 38. G5b-4b, 39. K-8h, 40. K-2b, 41. G5h-6h, 42. G4b-4c, 43. P-9h, 44. P-3e, 45. Px3e, 46. S-2d, 47. P-4e, 48. Sx3e, 49. P*3f, 50. Sx3f, 51. Px4d, 52. G4c-4b, 53. B*4f, 54. R-9b, 55. P-1e, 56. Px1e, 57. P*1g, 58. B*5a, 59. R-1h, 60. Sx3g, 61. BX6f, 62. Sx2f, 63. G-5h, 64. Bx7g+, 65. Gx7g, 66. P*6c, 67. Bx9a+, 68. Rx9a, 69. L*2i, 70. B*4f, 71. Lx2f, 72. Bx1h+, 73. Lx1h, 74. R*2h, 75. S-6g, 76. Rx2f+, 77. Lx1e, 78. N*5e, 79. P-1b+, 80. Lx1b, 81. Sx5f, 82. Lx1e, 83. Sx5e, 84. Sx5e, 85. N*7d, 86. K-7c, 87. Nx6b+, 88. Gx6b, 89. B*8b, 90. Sx6f, 91. P*7f, 92. K-2b, 93. Bx9a+, 94. Sx7g+, 95. Nx7g, 96. S*6i, 97. S*3c, 98. Nx3c, 99. Px3c+, 100. Gx3c, 101. N*1d, 102. K-1c, 103. S*2b, 104. Kx1d, 105. G*1c, 106. K-2e, 107. R*6e, 108. L*3e, 109. Rx6i, 110. N*2d, 111. B*4g, 112. S*4f, 113. S*3g, 114. Nx7f, 115. K-7h, 116. Sx4g+, 117. Sx2f, 118. Kx2f, 119. R-2i, 120. N*2g, 121. R*6f, 122. P*4f, 123. Gx4g, 124. B*4e, 125. S*5f, 126. G*6h, 127. Rx6h, 128. Nx6h+, 129. Kx6h, 130. L*6f, 131. P*6g, 132. Px4g+, 133. Sx4e, 134. R*5h sente resigns (diagram)

The final tournament bracket is shown below.

64th NHK Cup TV Shogi Tournament bracket (final)

== Other ==
- In addition to the defending champion Gōda, there were nine other former champions who qualified for the main tournament: Habu (38th, 41st, 45th, 47th—48th, 50th, 58th—61st), Y. Satō (56th—57th), Moriuchi (46th, 51st), Suzuki (49th), Miura (52nd), Kubo (53rd), Yamasaki (54th), Maruyama (55th), Watanabe (62nd).
- Sente won 29 (a little under 60%) of the 49 games.
- The average number of moves for the main tournament games was 120. The most moves played in a single game was 252 (Rd. 2, Namekata vs. Sawada) (Note: The first game between the two ended in impasse and the second game won by Namekata lasted 88 moves, so it actually took 340 moves for a winner to be determined) while the fewest moves played was 68 (Rd. 2, Miura vs. Toyoshima).
- Namekata versus Sawada in round 2 ended in impasse and both players played a second game with sente-gote reversed to determine the final result. (Note: The first game ended in impasse after 252 moves. Since both players had more than the required 24 points to establish impasse (Namekata had 25 points and Sawada had 29), Namekata proposed impasse and Sawada accepted. A second game at adjusted time controls was then played between the two which Namekata won in 88 moves.) Satō versus Fujii in round 2 ended in sennichite after 70 moves. The game was replayed with Fujii being sente at adjusted time controls (Note: Satō had one thinking-time period and Fujii had three-thinking time periods remaining when the first game ended. The time control for the replay game was 1 move per 30 seconds for each player with Fujii having seven thinking-time periods and Satō having only five.) which Fujii won in 121 moves.
- There was one disqualification due to an illegal move: Hashimoto 8d lost his semifinal game against Namekata 8d for the illegal move "Nifu" on his 92nd move.
- The age breakdown (age at start of the tournament) for the players who qualified was as follows: 10–19 years old, 2 players; 20–29 years old, 15 players; 30–39 years old, 11 players; 40–49 years old, 18 players; 50–59 years old, 4 players. The oldest player was Kōji Tosa 7d (59 years old) and the youngest player was Yūki Sasaki 4d (19 years old).

== See also ==
- 61st NHK Cup (shogi)
- 62nd NHK Cup (shogi)
- 63rd NHK Cup (shogi)
