= 62nd NHK Cup (shogi) =

The 62nd NHK Cup, or as it is officially known the 62nd NHK Cup TV Shogi Tournament (第62回NHK杯テレビ将棋トーナメント, dairokujūnikai enueichikeihai terebi shōgi tōnamento) was a professional shogi tournament organized by the Japan Shogi Association and sponsored by Japan's public broadcaster NHK. Play began on April 8, 2012, and ended on March 17, 2013. The 50-player single elimination tournament was won by Akira Watanabe. All of the tournament games were shown on NHK-E. The host (司会者, shikaisha) during the NHK-E broadcasts was female professional Rieko Yauchi.

== Participants ==
=== Preliminary tournaments ===
A total of 127 professional shogi players competed in 18 preliminary tournaments to qualify for the main tournament. These tournaments were non-televised one-day tournaments held at the Tokyo Shogi Kaikan and the Kansai Shogi Kaikan. Each tournament consisted of seven or eight players. The initial time control for each player was 20 minutes followed by a 30-second byōyomi.

The women's professional seed was determined by a single-game playoff between Hatsumi Ueda and Tomomi Kai, which was won by Kai.

Below are the bracket from two of the preliminary tournaments.

7-player preliminary tournament won by Atsushi Miyata 6d

8-player preliminary tournament won by Akira Inaba 5d

=== Main tournament ===
The first time control for main tournament games was ten minutes per player. Once this was used up, a second time control of 10 one-minute periods of "thinking time" (考慮時間, kōryō jikan) began. Each player was given 30 seconds to make their move. If they did so, then no thinking time periods were used. If, however, they did not, a thinking time period began and they then had up to one minute (more specifically 59 seconds) to make a move before entering the next thinking time period. This process was repeated until a player had used all ten thinking time periods. Then, the final byōyomi time control of 30 seconds per move then began. Sente was determined prior to each game by piece toss.

The 50 players listed below qualified for the main tournament.

No.	Player	Rank/Title
A1	**Yoshiharu Habu**	NHK Cup
A2	Atsushi Miyata	6d
A3	**Takanori Hashimoto**	8d
A4	Kensuke Kitahama	7d
A5	**Takayuki Yamasaki**	7d
A6	Shōji Segawa	4d
A7	**Hiroki Nakata**	8d
A8	**Toshiyuki Moriuchi**	Meijin
A9	**Chikara Akutsu**	7d
A10	Shingo Hirafuji	7d
A11	**Osamu Nakamura**	9d
A12	Kenjirō Abe	5d
A13	**Takeshi Fujii**	9d
A14	**Hiroyuki Miura**	8d
A15	**Tatsuya Sugai**	5d
A16	Masataka Sugimoto	7d
A17	Hiroshi Kamiya	7d
A18	**Takuya Nagase**	4d
A19	**Kazuki Kimura**	8d
A20	**Masataka Gōda**	Kiō
A21	Kōru Abe	4d
A22	**Mitsunori Makino**	4d
A23	Yoshikazu Minami	9d
A24	**Hisashi Namekata**	8d
A25	**Toshiaki Kubo**	9d

No.	Player	Rank/Title
B1	**Akira Watanabe**	Ryūō
B2	Keita Kadokura	4d
B3	**Kōichi Fukaura**	9d
B4	Hiroshi Kobayashi	7d
B5	**Taichi Nakamura**	5d
B6	Toshiyuki Nakao	5d
B7	**Ayumu Matsuo**	7d
B8	**Tadahisa Maruyama**	9d
B9	**Tadashi Ōishi**	4d
B10	Akira Inaba	5d
B11	**Amahiko Satō**	6d
B12	Kazutoshi Satō	5d
B13	**Yasumitsu Satō**	ōshō
B14	**Kōji Tanigawa**	9d
B15	Sakio Chiba	6d
B16	**Daisuke Suzuki**	8d
B17	Akira Shima	9d
B18	**Keita Inoue**	9d
B19	**Michio Takahashi**	9d
B20	**Nobuyuki Yashiki**	9d
B21	**Tomomi Kai**	W4d (Note: "W4d" stands for "Women's professional 4 dan")
B22	Hirotaka Nozuki	7d
B23	Shin'ya Satō	6d
B24	**Masayuki Toyoshima**	6d
B25	**Mamoru Hatakeyama**	7d

Notes:

- "No." represents the bracket position of the player in their respective block and "Rank/Title" represents the rank or title(s) held by the player when the original bracket was finalized. A dan/kyū (段級, dankyū) grading system is used for ranking players.
- Players whose names are in bold were seeded directly into the main tournament and are as follows: (Note: Players overlapping multiple categories are only listed once.)
1. 61st NHK Cup (four players): Habu (champion), Watanabe (runner-up), Kubo (semifinalist) and Hatakeyama (semifinalist).
2. Seven major titleholders (two players): Moriuchi (Meijin) and Gōda (Kiō) (Note: The other major titleholders at the end of the previous year were Habu (ōi, and Kisei), Watanabe (Ryūō and ōza), and Kubo (ōshō).)
3. Class A (six players): Y. Satō, Miura, Tanigawa, Yashiki, Takahashi, and Maruyama
4. Class B1 (twelve players): Kimura, Fujii, Fukaura, Matsuo, Namekata, Yamasaki, Suzuki, Nakata, Inoue, Nakamura, Hashimoto and Akutsu
5. Other tournament winners (two players): A. Satō (Shinjin-Ō) and Sugai (Daiwa Cup)
6. Women's professional (one player): Kai Women's 4 dan (Women's ōi)
7. Others with outstanding records (five players): Toyoshima (Class C1), Nakamura (Class C2), Ōishi (Class C2), Nagase (Class C2) and Makino (Class C2) (Note: Based upon JSA 2011 calendar year rankings in the following three categories: games played, games won, and winning percentage.)

Among these 32 seeds, the following 14 were given byes in round 1 and began play in round 2: Habu, Watanabe, Kubo, Hatakeyama, Moriuchi, Gōda, Y. Satō, Miura, Tanigawa, Yashiki, Takahashi, Maruyama, Kimura and Fujii.

- The remaining players qualified by winning preliminary tournaments.

The bracket at the start of the tournament in shown below.

62nd NHK Cup TV Shogi Tournament bracket (start)

== Results ==
Winners are listed in bold. "Date" refers to the date the game was broadcast. Dan and titles are as of the date the game was broadcast. "Guest Analyst" refers to the kishi who provided commentary during the broadcast. "No. of moves" refers to the total number of moves played in the game. (Note: Unlike in chess where moves are numbered in pairs, moves in shogi numbered individually so a game that lasts 51 moves means that sente made 26 moves and gote made 25 moves.)

=== Round 1 ===
A total of 18 games were played in round 1. Play began on April 8, 2012, and ended on August 12, 2012. The 18 preliminary tournament winners were paired against 18 seeded players.

No.	Block	Sente	Gote (Note: Gote (後手) refers to "the player who moves second".)	No. of moves	Date	Guest Analyst
1	B	Tadashi Ōishi 4d	**Akira Inaba 5d**	96	April 8, 2012	Takayuki Yamasaki 7d
2	A	**Kōru Abe 4d**	Mitsunori Makino 4d	167	April 15, 2012	Osamu Nakamura 9d
3	B	Shinya Satō 6d	**Masayuki Toyoshima 7d**	106	April 22, 2012	Amahiko Satō 7d
4	B	Hiroshi Kobayashi 7d	**Taichi Nakamura 6d**	80	April 29, 2012	Eiji Iijima 7d
5	B	Sakio Chiba 6d	**Daisuke Suzuki 8d**	184	May 6, 2012	Tadao Kitajima 6d
6	A	Yoshikazu Minami 9d	**Hisashi Namekata 8d**	112	May 13, 2012	Bungo Fukusaki 9d
7	A	**Takuya Nagase 4d**	Hiroshi Kamiya 7d	67	May 20, 2012	Akira Shima 9d
8	A	**Hiroki Nakata 8d**	Shōji Seigawa 4d	103	May 27, 2012	Takahiro Toyokawa 7d
9	A	Osamu Nakamura 9d	**Kenjirō Abe 5d**	106	June 3, 2012	Hirouki Miura 8d
10	B	**Ayumu Matsuo 7d**	Toshiyuki Nakao 5d	129	June 10, 2012	Teruichi Aono 9d
11	B	**Kōichi Fukaura 9d**	Keita Kadokura 4d	85	June 17, 2012	Kazuo Ishida 9d
12	B	**Amahiko Satō 7d**	Kazutoshi Satō 5d	131	June 24, 2012	Makoto Tobe 6d
13	B	Keita Inoue 9d	**Akira Shima 9d**	86	July 1, 2012	Yoshikazu Minami 9d
14	B	Tomomi Kai W-4d	**Hirotaka Notsuki 7d**	86	July 8, 2012	Yūsuke Tōyama 5d
15	A	**Masataka Sugimoto 7d**	Tatsuya Sugai 5d	115	July 15, 2012	Takashi Abe 8d
16	A	**Takanori Hashimoto 8d**	Atsushi Miyata 6d	133	July 22, 2012	Akira Watanabe Ryūō
17	A	Shingo Hirafuji 7d	**Chikara Akutsu 7d**	112	July 29, 2012	Mamoru Hatakeyama 7d
18	A	Kensuke Kitahama 7d	**Takayuki Yamasaki 7d**	86	August 5, 2012	Masayuki Toyoshima 7d

=== Round 2 ===
A total of 16 games were played in round 2. Play began on August 12, 2012, and ended on November 25, 2012. The 18 winners from round 1 were joined by the 14 players who had received round 1 byes.

No.	Block	Sente	Gote	No. of moves	Date	Guest Analyst
1	A	Kenjirō Abe 5d	**Takeshi Fujii 9d**	94	August 12, 2012	Kazuyoshi Nishimura 9d
2	B	**Akira Watanabe Ryūō**	Kōichi Fukaura 9d	87	August 19, 2012	Nobuyuki Yashiki 9d
3	B	**Daisuke Suzuki 8d**	Kōji Tanigawa 9d	89	August 26, 2012	Masataka Sugimoto 7d
4	A	**Hisashi Namekata 8d**	Toshiaki Kubo 9d	131	September 2, 2012	Masahiko Urano 7d
5	A	Kōru Abe 4d	**Masataka Gōda Kiō**	94	September 9, 2012	Yasumitsu Satō ōshō
6	B	Masayuki Toyoshima 7d	**Mamoru Hatakeyama 7d**	130	September 16, 2012	Akira Inaba 6d
7	B	**Taichi Nakamura 6d**	Ayumu Matsuo 7d	117	September 23, 2012	Kazuki Kimura 8d
8	B	**Nobuyuki Yashiki 9d**	Hirotaka Nozuki 7d	87	September 30, 2012	Makoto Chūza 7d
9	A	**Kazuki Kimura 8d**	Takuya Nagase 5d	87	October 7, 2012	Akihito Hirose 7d
10	B	**Amahiko Satō 7d**	Yasumitsu Satō ōshō	115	October 14, 2012	Manabu Senzaki 8d
11	B	**Michio Takahashi 9d**	Akira Shima 9d	95	October 21, 2012	Toshiyuki Moriuchi Meijin
12	A	Takanori Hashimoto 8d	**Yoshiharu Habu NHK Cup**	134	October 28, 2012	Chikara Akutsu 7d
13	B	**Akira Inaba 6d**	Tadahisa Maruyama 9d	179	November 4, 2012	Keita Inoue 9d
14	A	**Hiroyuki Miura 8d**	Masataka Sugimoto 7d	157	November 11, 2012	Daisuke Suzuki 8d
15	A	**Takayuki Yamasaki 7d**	Hiroki Nakata 8d	123	November 18, 2012	Michio Takahashi 9d
16	A	Chikara Akutsu 7d	**Toshiyuki Moriuchi Meijin**	106	November 25, 2012	Yasumitsu Satō ōshō

=== Round 3 ===
Play began on December 2, 2012, and ended on January 27, 2013. Out of the 18 preliminary tournament winners, only Akira Inaba 6d made it as far as round 3.

No.	Block	Sente	Gote	No. of moves	Date	Guest Analyst
1	A	**Yoshiharu Habu NHK Cup**	Takayuki Yamasaki 7d	85	December 2, 2012	Taku Morishita 9d
2	B	**Nobuyuki Yashiki 9d**	Mamoru Hatakeyama 7d	119	December 9, 2012	Hiroyuki Miura 8d
3	B	**Amahiko Satō 7d**	Akira Inaba 6d	123	December 16, 2012	Taichi Nakamura 6d
4	A	**Hiroyuki Miura 8d**	Kazuki Kimura 8d	117	December 23, 2012	Hirotaka Nozuki 7d
5	B	Michio Takahashi 9d	**Daisuke Suzuki 8d**	100	January 6, 2013	Takeshi Fujii 9d
6	B	Taichi Nakamura 6d	**Akira Watanabe Ryūō**	136	January 13, 2013	Yasuaki Murayama 6d
7	A	Takeshi Fujii 9d	**Toshiyuki Moriuchi Meijin**	102	January 20, 2013	Kōichi Fukaura 9d
8	A	Hisashi Namekata 8d	**Masataka Gōda Kiō**	122	January 27, 2013	Takanori Hashimoto 8d

=== Quarterfinals ===
The eight remaining players were paired off against each other with play beginning on February 3 and ending on February 24, 2013. Four major titleholders (Watanabe, Moriuchi, Habu, and Gōda) as well as four former NHK Cup Champions (Habu, Moriuchi, Miura, and Suzuki) made it as far as the quarterfinals.

No.	Block	Sente	Gote	No. of moves	Date	Guest Analyst
1	A	**Yoshiharu Habu NHK Cup**	Toshiyuki Moriuchi Meijin	107	February 3, 2013	Akira Shima 9d
2	B	**Akira Watanabe Ryūō**	Amahiko Satō 7d	81	February 10, 2013	Chikara Akutsu 7d
3	B	Nobuyuki Yashiki 9d	**Daisuke Suzuki 8d**	142	February 17, 2013	Toshiaki Kubo 9d
4	A	Hiroyuki Miura 8d	**Masataka Gōda Kiō**	100	February 24, 2013	Tadahisa Maruyama 9d

=== Semifinals ===
The two remaining players from each block with paired against each other to determine the respective block winners. The 1st semifinal game between Daisuke Suzuki 8d (sente) and Akira Watanabe Ryūō (gote) was broadcast on March 3, 2013. Watanabe won the game in 122 moves. The guest analyst was Taku Morishita 9d. The 2nd semifinal game was between Masataka Gōda Kiō (sente) and Yoshiharu Habu NHK Cup (gote). The game was broadcast on March 10, 2013, and won by Habu in 116 moves. The guest analyst was Manabu Senzaki 8d.

=== Finals ===
62nd NHK Cup Final
(109. P-83+)
Gote: Yoshiharu Habu NHK Cup
☖ pieces in hand: 歩(2)

9	8	7	6	5	4	3	2	1
								香	1
	飛		王	歩		金	歩		2
香	**と**	歩	歩		金	桂		歩	3
歩			桂	歩	歩	銀	歩		4
			桂	飛		歩			5
歩			銀	角	歩			歩	6
	歩	桂	金		銀	馬			7
		金							8
香		玉						香	9

☗ pieces in hand: 銀 歩
Sente: Akira Watanabe Ryūō

After 109 preliminary tournament games and 48 main tournament games involving 160 players, Yoshiharu Habu NHK Cup and Akira Watanabe Ryūō met in the final which was broadcast on March 17, 2013. Habu had won the tournament the previous four years and was on 24 NHK Cup game winning streak; Watanabe, on the other hand, was looking for his first NHK Cup championship and also to avoid losing to Habu in the finals for the second year in a row. (Note: This was the second time that Habu had faced the same player in consecutive NHK Cup finals. Habu beat Tetsurō Itodani 5d in the finals of both the 59th and 60th NHK Cup) The piece toss before the game resulted in Watanabe being sente and he won the game in 109 moves, thus becoming the 62nd NHK Cup Champion. The guest analyst for the final match were Takeshi Fujii 9 dan and the hosts were NHK announcer Nobuhiro Hori and female professional Rieko Yauchi. A radio broadcast of the final aired on May 3, 2013. The host was NHK announcer Taiga Sekiguchi and the guest analysts were Akira Shima 9d, Kazuki Kimura 8d and Takanori Hashimoto 8d.

The game score and a diagram showing the final position is given below.
Sente: Akira Watanabe Ryūō
Gote: Yoshiharu Habu NHK Cup
Opening: Fortress
1.P-76 P-34, 2. P-26 P-44, 3. P-25 B-33, 4. S-38 P-84, 5. S-78 P-85, 6. S-77 S-22, 7. P-56 B-42, 8. B-79 S-33, 9. G-78 G-32, 10. K-69 P-54, 11. P-36 G-52, 12 S-37 G52-43, 13. P-35 B-64, 14. Px34 Sx34, 15. P-46 K-41, 16. P-24 Px24, 17. Rx24 K-31, 18. R-28 P*34, 19. B-68 N-33, 20. K-79 S-62, 21. K-88 P-73, 22. P-66 P-75, 23. Px75 Bx75, 24. P*76 B-64, 25. G-58 S-73, 26. G58-67 S-34, 27. P*36 Px36, 28. Sx36 P*35, 29. S-47 N-73, 30. N-37 P-94, 31. P*24 P*22, 32. P-96 L-93, 33. B-57 R-92, 34. P-16 B-53, 35. P-65 Sx65, 36. B-84 P*72, 37. P-55 Px55, 38. P*52 K-42, 39. S-66 S-74, 40. P-51+ P-86, 41. Px86 Kx51, 42. R-58 P*87, 43. K-79 S-83, 44. B-75 Bx75, 45. Px75 B*27, 46. P*54 B-49+, 47. Rx55 P*52, 48. P-74 +B-48, 49. B*56 R-82, 50. Px73+ Px73, 51. N*65 K-62, 52. N-77 S-84, 53. P-85 +Bx37, 54. Px84 N*64, 55. P-83+, Gote resigns (diagram)

The final tournament bracket is shown below.

62nd NHK Cup TV Shogi Tournament bracket (final)

== Other ==
- Sente won 26 (a little more than 53%) of the 49 games.
- The average number of moves per main tournament game was 112. The most moves played in a single game was 184 (Rd. 1, Chiba 6d vs. Suzuki 8d) while the fewest moves played was 67 (Rd. 1, Nagase 4d vs. Kamiya 7d).
- There were no replays resulting from repetition (千日手, sennichite) or impasse (持将棋, jishōgi), and there were no disqualifications due to illegal moves or time forfeits.
- The age breakdown (age at start of the tournament) for the players who qualified was as follows: 10–19 years old, 3 players; 20–29 years old, 10 players; 30–39 years old, 19 players; 40–49 years old, 16 players; 50–59 years old, 2 players. The oldest player was Michio Takahashi 9d (51 years old) and the youngest player was Kōru Abe 4d (17 years old).

== See also ==
- 61st NHK Cup (shogi)
- 63rd NHK Cup (shogi)
- 64th NHK Cup (shogi)
