= 63rd NHK Cup (shogi) =

The 63rd NHK Cup, or as it is officially known the 63rd NHK Cup TV Shogi Tournament (第63回NHK杯テレビ将棋トーナメント, dairokujūsankai enueichikeihai terebi shōgi tōnamento) was a professional shogi tournament organized by the Japan Shogi Association and sponsored by Japan's public broadcaster NHK. Play began on April 7, 2013, and ended on March 23, 2014. The 50-player single elimination tournament was won by Masataka Gōda. All of the tournament games were shown on NHK-E. The host (司会者, shikaisha) during the NHK-E broadcasts was female professional Rieko Yauchi.

== Participants ==
=== Preliminary tournaments ===
A total of 130 professional shogi players competed in 18 preliminary tournaments to qualify for the main tournament. These tournaments were non-televised one-day tournaments held at the Tokyo Shogi Kaikan and the Kansai Shogi Kaikan. Each tournament consisted of seven or eight players. The initial time control for each player was 20 minutes followed by a 30-second byōyomi.

The female professional seed was Hatsumi Ueda. Brackets from two of the preliminary tournaments are shown below.

7-player preliminary tournament won by Taichi Takami 4d

8-player preliminary tournament won by Kōta Kanai 5d

=== Main tournament ===
The first time control for main tournament games was ten minutes per player. Once this was used up, a second time control of 10 one-minute periods of "thinking time" (考慮時間, Kōryō Jikan) began. Each player was given 30 seconds to make their move. If they did so, then no thinking time periods were used. If, however, they did not, a thinking time period began and they then had up to one minute (more specifically 59 seconds) to make a move before entering the next thinking time period. This process was repeated until a player had used all ten thinking time periods when the final byōyomi time control of 30 seconds per move began. Sente was determined prior to each game by piece toss.

The 50 players listed below qualified for the main tournament.

No.	Name	Rank/Title
A1	**Akira Watanabe**	NHK Cup
A2	Shōji Segawa	5d
A3	**Akihito Hirose**	7d
A4	**Yasuaki Murayama**	6d
A5	Kōru Abe	4d
A6	Amahiko Satō	7d
A7	**Takayuki Yamasaki**	7d
A8	**Yasumitsu Satō**	ōshō
A9	Tomohiro Murata	6d
A10	**Masayuki Toyoshima**	7d
A11	Kazuhiro Nishikawa	4d
A12	**Hatsumi Ueda**	W3d (Note: "W3d" stands for "Women's professional 3 dan".)
A13	**Kōji Tanigawa**	9d
A14	**Kōichi Fukaura**	9d
A15	Kōhei Funae	5d
A16	**Tetsurō Itodani**	6d
A17	Daisuke Nakagawa	8d
A18	**Ayumu Matsuo**	7d
A19	**Toshiyuki Moriuchi**	Meijin
A20	**Michio Takahashi**	9d
A21	**Taichi Nakamura**	6d
A22	Hirotaka Nozuki	7d
A23	Kōji Horiguchi	7d
A24	**Takuya Nagase**	5d
A25	**Masataka Gōda**	Kiō

No.	Name	Rank/Title
B1	**Yoshiharu Habu**	3 crown (Note: The Japanese character 冠 means "crown" and is commonly used as an honorific suffix attached to the names of multiple major titleholders; Therefore, "3 crown" (三冠, sankan) means that the player currently holds three major titles. Players holding only one major title are commonly referred to by their title. Non major titleholders are referred to by their rank ("dan").)
B2	Kensuke Kitahama	7d
B3	**Kazuki Kimura**	8d
B4	Masahiko Urano	8d
B5	**Tadashi Ōishi**	4d
B6	**Hisashi Namekata**	8d
B7	Manabu Senzaki	8d
B8	**Nobuyuki Yashiki**	9d
B9	**Mamoru Hatakeyama**	7d
B10	Keiji Mori	9d
B11	**Hiroki Nakata**	8d
B12	Yūki Sasaki	4d
B13	**Takanori Hashimoto**	8d
B14	**Tadahisa Maruyama**	9d
B15	Taichi Takami	4d
B16	**Eiji Iijima**	7d
B17	**Keita Inoue**	9d
B18	Kōta Kanai	5d
B19	**Toshiaki Kubo**	9d
B20	**Hiroyuki Miura**	8d
B21	**Chikara Akutsu**	7d
B22	Isao Nakata	7d
B23	**Hiroki Iizuka**	7d
B24	Issei Takazaki	6d
B25	**Daisuke Suzuki**	8d

Notes:

- "No." represents the bracket position of the player in their respective block and "Rank/Title" represents the rank or titles held by the player when the original bracket finalized. A dan/kyū (段級, dankyū) grading system is used for ranking players.
- Players whose names are in bold were seeded directly into the main tournament as follows: (Note: Players overlapping multiple categories are only listed once.)
1. 62nd NHK Cup (four players): Watanabe (champion), Habu (runner-up), Suzuki (semifinalist) and Gōda (semifinalist).
2. Seven major titleholders (two players): Moriuchi (Meijin) and Satō (ōshō) (Note: The other major titleholders at the end of the previous year were Habu (ōza, ōi, and Kisei), Watanabe (Ryūō), and Gōda (Kiō).)
3. Class A (six players): Miura, Tanigawa, Yashiki, Takahashi, Hashimoto and Fukaura
4. Class B1 (twelve players): Maruyama, Kubo, Akutsu, Kimura, Namekata, Yamasaki, Inoue, Matsuo, Nakata, Hatakeyama, Hirose and Iizuka
5. Other tournament winners (one player): Nagase (Shinjin-Ō)
6. Women's professional (one player): Ueda Women's 3 dan (Mynavi Women's Shogi Open Champion)
7. Others with outstanding records (six players): Iijima (Class B2), Toyoshima (Class B2), Murayama (Class C1), Itodani (Class C1), Nakamura (Class C1), Ōishi (Class C2) (Note: Based upon JSA 2012 calendar year rankings in the following three categories: games played, games won, and winning percentage.)

Among these 32 seeds, the following 14 were given byes in round 1 and began play in round 2: Watanabe, Habu, Suzuki, Gōda, Moriuchi, Satō, Miura, Tanigawa, Yashiki, Takahashi, Hashimoto, Fukaura, Maruyama, and Kubo.

- The remaining players qualified by winning preliminary tournaments.

The bracket at the start of the tournament is shown below.

63rd NHK Cup TV Shogi Tournament bracket (start)

== Results ==
Winners are listed in bold. "Date" refers to the date the game was broadcast. Dan and titles are as of the date the game was broadcast. "Guest Analyst" refers to the kishi who provided expert commentary during the broadcast. "No. of moves" refers to the total number of moves played in the game. (Note: Unlike in chess where moves are numbered in pairs, moves in shogi are numbered individually. So, a game that lasts 51 moves means that sente made 26 moves and gote made 25 moves.)

=== Round 1 ===
A total of 18 games were played in round 1. Play began on April 7, 2013, and ended on August 8, 2013. The 18 preliminary tournament winners were paired against 18 seeded players.

No.	Block	Sente	Gote (Note: Gote (後手) refers to "the player who moves second".)	No. of moves	Date	Guest Analyst
1	A	**Taichi Nakamura 6d**	Hirotaka Nozuki 7d	165	April 7, 2013	Chikara Akutsu 7d
2	B	**Eiji Iijima 7d**	Taichi Takami 4d	97	April 14, 2013	Kiyokazu Katsumata 6d
3	A	Kōji Horiguchi 7d	**Takuya Nagase 5d**	106	April 21, 2013	Osamu Nakamura 9d
4	B	**Keiji Mori 9d**	Mamoru Hatakeyama 7d	109	April 28, 2013	Bungo Fukusaki 9d
5	B	**Hiroki Nakata 8d**	Yūki Sasaki 4d	105	May 5, 2013	Kazuo Ishida 9d
6	A	Daisuke Nakagawa 8d	**Ayumu Matsuo 7d**	184	May 12, 2013	Takahiro Toyokawa 7d
7	B	**Tadashi Ōishi 5d**	Masahiko Urano 8d	113	May 19, 2013	Isao Nakata 7d
8	A	**Amahiko Satō 7d**	Takayuki Yamasaki 7d	155	May 26, 2013	Akira Inaba 6d
9	B	**Hisashi Namekata 8d**	Manabu Senzaki 8d	119	June 2, 2013	Yoshiharu Habu 3 crown
10	B	Kensuke Kitahama 8d	**Kazuki Kimura 8d**	150	June 9, 2013	Nobuyuki Yashiki 9d
11	B	Isao Nakata 7d	**Chikara Akutsu 7d**	120	June 16, 2013	Masahiko Urano 8d
12	B	**Kōta Kanai 4d**	Keita Inoue 9d	119	June 23, 2013	Tadao Kitajima 6d
13	A	**Yasuaki Murayama 6d**	Kōru Abe 4d	143	June 30, 2013	Taichi Nakamura 6d
14	A	Tetsurō Itodani 6d	**Kōhei Funae 5d**	176	July 7, 2013	Takayuki Yamasaki 7d
15	B	**Issei Takazaki 6d**	Hiroki Iizuka 7d	119	July 14, 2013	Daisuke Nakagawa 8d
16	A	**Akihito Hirose 7d**	Shōji Seigawa 5d	151	July 21, 2013	Eiji Iijima 7d
17	A	Tomohiro Murata 6d	**Masayuki Toyoshima 7d**	138	July 28, 2013	Takashi Abe 8d
18	A	Hatsumi Ueda W3d	**Kazuhiro Nishikawa 4d**	112	August 4, 2013	Makoto Tobe 6d

=== Round 2 ===
A total of 16 games were played in round 2. Play began on August 11, 2013, and ended on November 24, 2013. The 18 winners from round 1 were joined by the 14 players who had received round 1 byes.

No.	Block	Sente	Gote	No. of moves	Date	Guest Analyst
1	B	Keiji Mori 9d	**Nobuyuki Yashiki 9d**	96	August 11, 2013	Michio Takahashi 9d
2	A	**Toshiyuki Moriuchi Meijin**	Ayumu Matsuo 7d	125	August 18, 2013	Hirotaka Nozuki 7d
3	A	Taichi Nakamura 6d	**Michio Takahashi 9d**	104	August 25, 2013	Kōichi Fukaura 9d
4	B	Eiji Iijima 7d	**Tadahisa Maruyama 9d**	88	September 1, 2013	Akira Watanabe NHK Cup
5	A	Amahiko Satō 7d	**Yasuaki Murayama 6d**	120	September 8, 2013	Kazuki Kimura 8d
6	B	**Kōta Kanai 5d**	Toshiaki Kubo 9d	117	September 15, 2013	Takeshi Fujii 9d
7	B	Daisuke Suzuki 8d	**Issei Takazaki 6d**	212	September 22, 2013	Manabu Senzaki 8d
8	A	**Masayuki Toyoshima 7d**	Yasumitsu Satō 9d	103	September 29, 2013	Kōji Tanigawa 9d
9	A	Akira Watanabe NHK Cup	**Akihito Hirose 7d**	98	October 6, 2013	Amahiko Satō 7d
10	B	**Hiroki Nakata 8d**	Takanori Hashimoto 8d	117	October 13, 2013	Ayumu Matsuo 7d
11	A	Kōji Tanigawa 9d	**Kazuhiro Nishikawa 4d**	124	October 20, 2013	Toshiaki Kubo 9d
12	B	**Yoshiharu Habu 3 crown**	Kazuki Kimura 8d	131	October 27, 2013	Yasumitsu Satō 9d
13	A	**Masataka Gōda 9d**	Takuya Nagase 6d	105	November 3, 2013	Taku Morishita 9d
14	B	**Hiroyuki Miura 9d**	Chikara Akutsu 7d	99	November 10, 2013	Hisashi Namekata 8d
15	B	**Tadashi Ōishi 6d**	Hisashi Namekata 8d	77	November 17, 2013	Kensuke Kitahama 8d
16	A	**Kōhei Funae 5d**	Kōichi Fukaura 9d	85	November 24, 2013	Mamoru Hatakeyama 7d

=== Round 3 ===
Play began on December 1, 2013, and ended on January 26, 2014. Out of the 18 preliminary tournament winners, only the following four made it to round 3: Kanai 5d, Nishikawa 4d, Takazaki 6d and Funae 5d

No.	Block	Sente	Gote	No. of moves	Date	Guest Analyst
1	B	**Tadahisa Maruyama 9d**	Kōta Kanai 5d	149	December 1, 2013	Masataka Gōda 9d
2	A	Akihito Hirose 7d	**Yasuaki Murayama 6d**	124	December 8, 2013	Daisuke Suzuki 8d
3	A	**Masataka Gōda 9d**	Michio Takahashi 9d	81	December 15, 2013	Osamu Nakamura 9d
4	B	Yoshiharu Habu 3 crown	**Tadashi Ōishi 6d**	126	December 22, 2013	Takayuki Yamasaki 8d
5	B	**Hiroyuki Miura 9d**	Issei Takazaki 6d	163	January 5, 2014	Akihito Hirose 7d
6	B	**Nobuyuki Yashiki 9d**	Hiroki Nakata 8d	129	January 12, 2014	Akira Shima 9d
7	A	**Toshiyuki Moriuchi 2 crown** (Note: Challenger Moriuchi defeated defending champion Watanabe in Game 5 of the 26th Ryūō Tournament on November 29, 2013, to take the Ryūō title and, thus become a "2 crown".)	Kōhei Funae 5d	117	January 19, 2014	Takashi Abe 8d
8	A	Masayuki Toyoshima 7d	**Kazuhiro Nishikawa 4d**	154	January 26, 2014	Akira Inaba 7d

=== Quarterfinals ===
The eight remaining players were paired off against each other with play beginning on February 2 and ending on February 23, 2014. Only one major titleholder, Moriuchi 2 crown, made it as far as the quarterfinals.

No.	Block	Sente	Gote	No. of moves	Date	Guest Analyst
1	A	Toshiyuki Moriuchi 2 Crown	**Masataka Gōda 9d**	120	February 2, 2014	Yasumitsu Satō 9d
2	B	**Tadahisa Maruyama 9d**	Hiroyuki Miura 9d	117	February 9, 2014	Kazuki Kimura 8d
3	A	Yoshiaki Murayama 6d	**Kazuhiro Nishikawa 4d**	117	February 16, 2014	Chikara Akutsu 8d
4	B	**Tadashi Ōishi 6d**	Nobuyuki Yashiki 9d	102	February 23, 2014	Masayuki Toyoshima 7d

=== Semifinals ===
The two remaining players from each block with paired against each other to determine the respective block winners. The 1st semifinal game between Kazuhiro Nishikawa 4d (sente) and Masataka Gōda 9d (gote) was broadcast on March 2, 2014. Gōda won the game in 128 moves, thus stopping Nishikawa's NHK Cup winning streak at six. (Note: Nishikawa won three games to win his preliminary tournament, and then his first three main tournament games.) The guest analyst was Kunio Naitō 9d. The 2nd semifinal game was between Tadashi Ōishi 6d (sente) and Tadahisa Maruyama 9d (gote). The game was broadcast on March 9, 2014, and won by Maruyama in 104 moves. The guest analyst was Daisuke Katagami 6d.

=== Finals ===
After 112 preliminary tournament games and 48 main tournament games involving 162 players, Tadashisa Maruyama 9d and Masataka Gōda 9d met in the final broadcast on March 23, 2014. This was the second NHK Cup final appearance for both players: Maruyama defeated Akira Watanabe to win the 55th NHK Cup (2005) and Gōda was runner-up to Daisuke Suzuki in the 49th NHK Cup (1999). The piece toss before the game resulted in Maruyama being sente. Gōda won the game in 82 moves, thus winning the tournament for the first time and becoming the 63rd NHK Cup Champion. The guest analysts for the final match were Toshiyuki Moriuchi 2-crown and Keita Inoue 9d and the hosts of the final were NHK announcer Ryō Nagano and women's professional Rieko Yauchi.

63rd NHK Cup Final (82. Sx7g+)
Gote: Masataka Gōda 9d
☖ pieces in hand: Pieces-in-hand: 桂(2)

9	8	7	6	5	4	3	2	1
竜				金	王		桂	香	1
		と	銀		銀	金	歩		2
		歩	歩	歩	歩	銀		歩	3
歩							歩		4
		飛				歩			5
歩			歩		香	歩		角	6
		**全**		歩	歩			歩	7
	玉								8
香				金				香	9

☗ pieces in hand: 角 金 桂 歩(2)
Sente: Tadahisa Maruyama 9d

The game score and a diagram showing the final position is given below.
Sente: Tadahisa Maruyama 9d
Gote: Masataka Gōda 9d
Opening: Yokufudori
1. P-2f, 2. P-3d, 3. P-7f, 4. P-8d, 5. P-2e, 6. P-8e, 7. G-7h, 8. G-3b, 9. P-2d, 10. Px2d, 11. Rx2d, 12. P-8f, 13. Px8f, 14. Rx8f, 15. Rx3d, 16. B-3c, 17. K-5h, 18. K-4a, 19. P-3f, 20. G-5a, 21. N-3g, 22. S-6b, 23. S-3h, 24. S-2b, 25. P-9f, 26. P-9d, 27. N-4e, 28. P*3g, 29. Sx3g, 30. Bx8h+, 31. Sx8h, 32. B*5e, 33. B*7g, 34. Rx7f, 35. R-8d, 36. Bx3g+, 37. Rx8a+, 38. R-7e, 39. G-4h, 40. +Bx4h, 41. Kx4h, 42. Rx4e, 43. B*3d, 44. R-7e, 45. K-5h, 46. S-3c, 47. B-1f, 48. N*6e, 49. P*2d, 50. P*2b, 51. +Rx9a, 52. Nx7g+, 53. Sx7g, 54. B*3g, 55. N*3e, 56. P*3d, 57. L*4f, 58. S*4b, 59. P*7b, 60. Px3e, 61. P-6f, 62. N*8e, 63. P-7a+, 64. Nx7g+, 65. Nx7g, 66. S*7f, 67. N*8i, 68. G*5i, 69. K-6h, 70. B-4h+, 71. +P-7b, 72. +B-5h, 73. K-7i, 74. +B-6i, 75. K-8h, 76. +Bx7h, 77. Kx7h, 78. G*6g, 79. K-8h, 80. Gx7g, 81. Nx7g, 82. Sx7g+, sente resigns (diagram)

The final tournament bracket is shown below.

63rd NHK Cup TV Shogi Tournament bracket (final)

== Other ==
- Sente won 27 (a little more than 55%) of the 49 games.
- The average number of moves for the main tournament games was 122. The most moves played in a single game was 212 (Rd. 2, Suzuki 8d vs. Takazaki 6d) while the fewest moves played was 77 (Rd. 2, Ōishi 6d vs. Namekata 8d).
- There were no replays resulting from repetition (千日手, sennichite) or impasse (持将棋, jishōgi), and there were no disqualifications due to illegal moves or time forfeits.
- The age breakdown (age at start of the tournament) for the players who qualified was as follows: 10–19 years old, 3 players; 20–29 years old, 14 players; 30–39 years old, 15 players; 40–49 years old, 15 players; 50–59 years old, 2 players; 60+ years old, 1 player. The oldest player was Keiji Mori 9d (67 years old) and the youngest player was Kōru Abe 4d (18 years old).

== See also ==
- 61st NHK Cup (shogi)
- 62nd NHK Cup (shogi)
- 64th NHK Cup (shogi)
