= 61st NHK Cup (shogi) =

The 61st NHK Cup, or as it is officially known the 61st NHK Cup TV Shogi Tournament (第61回NHK杯テレビ将棋トーナメント, dairokujūikkai enueichikeihai terebi shōgi tōnamento) was a professional shogi tournament organized by the Japan Shogi Association and sponsored by Japan's public broadcaster NHK. Play began on April 3, 2011, and ended on March 18, 2012. The 50-player single elimination tournament was won by Yoshiharu Habu. All of the tournament games were shown each Sunday morning on NHK-E. The host (司会者, shikaisha) during the NHK-E broadcasts was female professional Rieko Yauchi.

== Participants ==
=== Preliminary tournaments ===
A total of 139 shogi professionals competed in eighteen preliminary tournaments to qualify for the main tournament. These tournaments were one-day tournaments held at the Tokyo Shogi Kaikan and the Kansai Shogi Kaikan, but were not televised. Each tournament consisted of seven or eight players. The initial time control for each player was 20 minutes followed by a 30-second byōyomi.

The women's professional seed was determined by a play-in game between Kana Satomi and Tomomi Kai, which was won by Kai.

Brackets from two of the preliminary tournaments are shown below.

7-player preliminary tournament won by Tatsuya Sugai 4d

8-player preliminary tournament won by Takuya Nagase 4d

=== Main tournament ===
The first time control for main tournament games was ten minutes per player. Once this was used up, a second time control of 10 one-minute periods of "thinking time" (考慮時間, kōryō jikan) began. Each player was given 30 seconds to make their move. If they did so, then no thinking time periods were used. If, however, they did not, a thinking time period began and they then had up to one minute (more specifically 59 seconds) to make a move before entering the next thinking time period. This process was repeated until a player had used all ten thinking time periods. Then, the final byōyomi time control of 30 seconds per move then began. Sente was determined prior to each game by piece toss.

The 50 players listed below qualified for the main tournament.

No.	Player	Rank/Title
A1	**Tadahisa Maruyama**	9d
A2	**Tomomi Kai**	F3d (Note: "W3d" stands for "Women's professional 3 dan".)
A3	Akira Shima	9d
A4	**Takahiro Toyokawa**	7d
A5	Hiroshi Kobayashi	7d
A6	**Kazuki Kimura**	8d
A7	**Kōji Tanigawa**	9d
A8	**Mamoru Hatakeyama**	7d
A9	Keiji Mori	9d
A10	**Hiroki Nakata**	8d
A11	Shūji Muranaka	6d
A12	**Hiroyuki Miura**	8d
A13	**Masataka Gōda**	9d
A14	Kōta Kanai	5d
A15	**Osamu Nakamura**	9d
A16	**Yasumitsu Satō**	9d
A17	Takuya Nagase	4d
A18	**Akihito Hirose**	Ōi
A19	Chikara Akutsu	7d
A20	**Yoshiyuki Kubota**	6d
A21	Kōhei Funae	4d
A22	**Yasuaki Murayama**	5d
A23	Daisuke Katagami	6d
A24	**Makoto Tobe**	6d
A25	**Yoshiharu Habu**	NHK Cup

No.	Player	Rank/Title
B1	**Akira Watanabe**	Ryūō
B2	Amahiko Satō	6d
B3	**Masayuki Toyoshima**	6d
B4	Kōzō Arimori	7d
B5	**Kenjirō Abe**	5d
B6	**Michio Takahashi**	9d
B7	**Takeshi Fujii**	9d
B8	Akio Ishikawa	7d
B9	**Kōichi Fukaura**	9d
B10	**Hisashi Namekata**	9d
B11	Tatsuya Sugai	4d
B12	**Keita Inoue**	9d
B13	**Toshiaki Kubo**	2 crown (Note: Kubo held both the Kiō and ōshō when the tournament bracket was finalized.)
B14	Yūsuke Tōyama	5d
B15	**Daisuke Suzuki**	8d
B16	**Takayuki Yamasaki**	7d
B17	Mitsunori Makino	4d
B18	**Toshiyuki Moriuchi**	9d
B19	**Masataka Sugimoto**	7d
B20	Yūsuke Ina	6d
B21	Taichi Nakamura	5d
B22	**Ayumu Matsuo**	7d
B23	**Nobuyuki Yashiki**	9d
B24	Tadao Kitajima	6d
B25	**Tetsurō Itodani**	5d

Notes:

- "No." represents the bracket position of the player in their respective block and "Rank/Title" represents the rank or title(s) held by the player when the original bracket was finalized. A dan/kyū grading system is used for ranking players.
- Players whose names are in bold were seeded directly into the main tournament and are as follows: (Note: Players overlapping multiple categories are only listed once.)
1. 60th NHK Cup (four players): Habu (champion), Itodani (runner-up), Maruyama (semifinalist) and Watanabe (semifinalist).
2. Seven major titleholders (two players): Hirose (Ōi) and Kubo (Ōshō and Kiō) (Note: The other major titleholders at the end of the previous year were Habu (Meijin, ōza, and Kisei), and Watanabe (Ryūō))
3. Class A (seven players): Miura, Takahashi, Moriuchi, Kimura, Tanigawa, Gōda, Fujii
4. Class B1 (thirteen players): Inoue, Y. Satō, Fukaura, Namekata, Matsuo, Yamasaki, Yashiki, Suzuki, Toyokawa, Sugimoto, Hatakeyama, Nakamura, and Nakata
5. Other tournament winners (one player): Abe (Shinjin-Ō)
6. Female professional (one player): Kai
7. Others with outstanding records (four players): Kubota (Class B2), Tobe (Class B2), Murayama (Class C1), and Toyoshima (Class C1) (Note: Based upon JSA 2010 calendar year rankings in the following three categories: games played, games won, and winning percentage.)

Among these 32 seeds, the following 14 were given byes in Round 1 and began play in Round 2: Habu, Itodani, Maruyama, Watanabe, Takahashi, Fujii, Inoue, Kubo, Moriuchi, Hirose, Gōda, Miura, Tanigawa, and Kimura.

- The remaining players qualified by winning preliminary tournaments.

The bracket at the start of the tournament in shown below.

61st NHK Cup TV Shogi Tournament bracket (start)

== Results ==
Winners are listed in bold. "Date" refers to the date the game was broadcast. Dan and titles are as of the date the game was broadcast. "Guest Analyst" refers to the kishi who provided commentary during the broadcast. "No. of moves" refers to the total number of moves played in the game. (Note: Unlike in chess where moves are numbered in pairs, moves in shogi numbered individually so a game that lasts 51 moves means that sente made 26 moves and gote made 25 moves.)

=== Round 1 ===
A total of 18 games were played in round 1. Play began on April 3, 2011, and ended on July 31, 2011. The 18 preliminary tournament winners were paired against 18 seeded players.

No.	Block	Sente	Gote (Note: Gote (後手) refers to "the player who moves second".)	No. of moves	Date	Guest Analyst
1	B	Taichi Nakamura 5d	**Ayumu Matsu 7d**	108	April 3, 2011	Manabu Senzaki 8d
2	B	**Yūsuke Tōyama 5d**	Daisuke Suzuki 8d	85	April 10, 2011	Nobuyuki Yashiki 9d
3	A	Osamu Nakamura 9d	**Kōta Kanai 5d**	126	April 17, 2011	Takanori Hashimoto 7d
4	B	**Masataka Sugimoto 7d**	Yūsuke Ina 6d	157	April 24, 2011	Kenji Kobayashi 9d
5	A	Kōhei Funae 4d	**Yasuaki Murayama 5d**	80	May 1, 2011	Keita Inoue 9d
6	B	Amahiko Satō 6d	**Masayuki Toyoshima 6d**	102	May 8, 2011	Eiji Iijima 7d
7	A	Hiroki Nakata 8d	**Shūji Muranaka 6d**	110	May 15, 2011	Akira Shima 9d
8	A	**Chikara Akutsu 7d**	Yoshiyuki Kubota 6d	97	May 22, 2011	Ayumu Matsuo 7d
9	B	**Tadao Kitajima 6d**	Nobuyuki Yashiki 9d	115	May 29, 2011	Daisuke Nakagawa 8d
10	A	**Takuya Nagase 5d**	Yasumitsu Satō 9d	131	June 5, 2011	Daisuke Suzuki 8d
11	B	**Kenjirō Abe 5d**	Kōzō Arimori 7d	75	June 12, 2011	Takeshi Fujii 9d
12	A	**Mamoru Hatakeyama 7d**	Keiji Mori 9d	153	June 19, 2011	Yoshikazu Minami 9d
13	B	**Kōichi Fukaura 9d**	Akio Ishikawa 6d	130	June 26, 2011	Osamu Nakamura 9d
14	B	Hisashi Namekata 8d	**Tatsuya Sugai 4d**	120	July 3, 2011	Toshiaki Kubo 2 crown
15	A	Takahiro Toyokawa 7d	**Hiroshi Kobayashi 7d**	96	July 10, 2011	Takashi Abe 8d
16	A	Daisuke Katagami 6d	**Makoto Tobe 6d**	142	July 17, 2011	Akihito Hirose ōi
17	B	Mitsunori Makino 4d	**Takayuki Yamasaki 7d**	114	July 24, 2011	Mamoru Hatakeyama 7d
18	A	**Akira Shima 9d**	Tomomi Kai W3d	75	July 31, 2011	Chikara Akutsu 7d

=== Round 2 ===
A total of 16 games were played in round 2. Play began on August 7, 2011, and ended on November 27, 2011. The 18 winners from round 1 were joined by the 14 players who had received round 1 byes.

No.	Block	Sente	Gote	No. of moves	Date	Guest Analyst
1	B	Masayuki Toyoshima 6d	**Akira Watanabe Ryūō**	150	August 7, 2011	Yasumitsu Satō 9d
2	A	Shūji Muranaka 6d	**Hiroyuki Miura 8d**	102	August 14, 2011	Kazuki Kimura 8d
3	B	Tetsurō Itodani 5d	**Tadao Kitajima 6d**	126	August 21, 2011	Daisuke Katagami 6d
4	B	**Ayumu Matsuo 7d**	Masataka Sugimoto 7d	137	August 28, 2011	Masayuki Toyoshima 6d
5	A	**Mamoru Hatakeyama 7d**	Kōji Tanigawa 9d	115	September 4, 2011	Kunio Naitō 9d
6	B	**Tatsuya Sugai 5d**	Keita Inoue 9d	111	September 11, 2011	Akira Watanabe Ryūō
7	A	**Masataka Gōda 9d**	Kōta Kanai 5d	109	September 18, 2011	Taku Morishita 9d
8	B	**Kōichi Fukaura 9d**	Takeshi Fujii 9d	109	October 2, 2011	Toshiyuki Moriuchi Meijin (Note: Moriuchi defeated the reigning Meijin Habu four games to three to become the 69th Meijin in June 2011.)
9	B	Takayuki Yamasaki 7d	**Toshiyuki Moriuchi Meijin**	100	October 9, 2011	Kōji Tanigawa
10	A	Hiroshi Kobayashi 7d	**Kazuki Kimura 8d**	126	October 16, 2011	Takanori Hashimoto 7d
11	B	**Toshiaki Kubo 2 crown**	Yūsuke Tōyama 5d	69	October 23, 2011	Makoto Tobe 6d
12	A	**Tadahisa Maruyama 9d**	Akira Shima	115	October 30, 2011	Masataka Gōda 9d
13	A	Takuya Nagase 4d	**Akihito Hirose 7d** (Note: Hirose lost his ōi title to Habu four games to three in September 2011.)	136	November 6, 2011	Yūsuke Tōyama 5d
14	A	**Chikara Akutsu 7d**	Yasuaki Murayama 5d	103	November 13, 2011	Hirotaka Nozuki 7d
15	A	**Yoshiharu Habu NHK Cup**	Makoto Tobe 6d	107	November 20, 2011	Manabu Senzaki 8d
16	B	Michio Takahashi 9d	**Kenjirō Abe 5d**	86	November 27, 2011	Nobuyuki Yashiki 9d

=== Round 3 ===
Play began on December 4, 2011, and ended on January 29, 2012. Sugai, Kitajima and Akutsu were the only preliminary tournament winners make it as far as round 3. Kubo vs. Moriuchi (round 3, game 4) was the first pairing of major titleholders in the tournament.

No.	Block	Sente	Gote	No. of moves	Date	Guest Analyst
1	B	**Ayumu Matsuo 7d**	Tadao Kitajima 6d	97	December 4, 2011	Takahiro Toyokawa 7d
2	A	**Masataka Gōda 9d**	Akihito Hirose 7d	103	December 11, 2011	Daisuke Suzuki 8d
3	A	Tadahisa Maruyama 9d	**Kazuki Kimura 8d**	104	December 18, 2011	Ayumu Matsuo 7d
4	B	**Toshiaki Kubo 2 crown**	Toshiyuki Moriuchi Meijin	109	December 25, 2011	Kunio Yonenaga Lifetime Kisei
5	B	**Akira Watanabe Ryūō**	Kenjirō Abe 5d	63	January 8, 2012	Kazuki Kimura 8d
6	A	**Mamoru Hatakeyama 7d**	Hiroyuki Miura 8d	67	January 15, 2012	Takayuki Yamasaki 7d
7	A	**Yoshiharu Habu NHK Cup**	Chikara Akutsu 7d	137	January 22, 2012	Taku Morishita 9d
8	B	Kōichi Fukaura 9d	**Tatsuya Sugai 5d**	148	January 29, 2012	Keita Inoue 9d

=== Quarterfinals ===
The eight remaining players were paired off against each other with play beginning on February 5 and ending on February 26, 2012. The last remaining preliminary tournament winner (Sugai) was joined by three major titleholders (Habu, Watanabe, and Kubo), two Class A players (Kimura and Gōda) and two Class B1 players (Hatakeyama and Matsuo). Sugai's feat was even more impressive because he had only become a professional in April 2010, and this was his first time participating in the NHK Cup tournament.

No.	Block	Sente	Gote	No. of moves	Date	Guest Analyst
1	B	**Toshiaki Kubo 2 crown**	Ayumu Matsuo 7d	101	February 5, 2012	Akihito Hirose 7d
2	A	**Yoshiharu Habu NHK Cup**	Masataka Gōda 9d	99	February 12, 2012	Kōichi Fukaura 9d
3	A	Kazuki Kimura 8d	**Mamoru Hatakeyama 7d**	114	February 19, 2012	Michio Takahashi 9d
4	B	**Akira Watanabe Ryūō**	Tatsuya Sugai 5d	93	February 26, 2012	Makoto Tobe 6d

=== Semifinals ===
The two remaining players from each block with paired against each other to determine the respective block winners. The 1st semifinal game between Akira Watanabe Ryūō (sente) and Toshiaki Kubo 2 crown (gote) was broadcast on March 4, 2012. Watanabe won the game in 127 moves. The guest analyst was Kōji Tanigawa 9d. The 2nd semifinal game was between Mamoru Hatakeyama 7d (sente) and Yoshiharu Habu NHK Cup (gote). The game was broadcast on March 11, 2012, and won by Habu in 108 moves. The guest analyst was Osamu Nakamura 9d.

=== Finals ===
After 112 preliminary tournament games and 48 main tournament games involving 172 players, Yoshiharu Habu NHK Cup and Akira Watanabe Ryūō met in the final which was broadcast on March 18, 2012. Habu had won the tournament the previous three years (58th NHK Cup – 60th NHK Cup) and was riding a 19 NHK Cup game winning streak; Watanabe, on the other hand, was looking for his first NHK Cup championship to add to the major titles he had already won. A victory over Watanabe would also be Habu's tenth NHK Cup title overall, thus making him the first player to qualify for the title of "Lifetime NHK Cup Champion". The piece toss before the game resulted in Habu being sente and he won the game in 147 moves, thus becoming the 61st NHK Cup Champion、the first player to win the tournament 4 times in a row (Note: No other player has won the tournament more than twice in a row and only two other players besides Habu (Yasumitsu Satō and Yasuharu Oyama) have defended their title and repeated as champion) and the first "Lifetime NHK Cup Champion". The guest analyst for the final match were Toshiyuki Moriuchi Meijin and the hosts were NHK announcer Taiga Sekiguchi and female professional Rieko Yauchi. A radio broadcast of the final aired on March 20, 2012. The host was NHK announcer Nobuo Murakami and the guest analysts were Kunio Yonenaga Lifetime Kisei, Kōji Tanigawa 9d and Takanori Hashimoto 8d.

61st NHK Cup Final (147. Gx9c)
Gote: Akira Watanabe Ryūō
☖ pieces in hand: 銀 桂 歩(6)

9	8	7	6	5	4	3	2	1
									1
		角				銀		王	2
**金**	香	角							3
玉		歩		歩	銀	桂	歩	歩	4
	香				歩			香	5
	金	歩		歩		竜	桂		6
歩			金		歩				7
					銀				8
香	桂								9

☗ pieces in hand: 飛 金 歩(3)
Sente: Yoshiharu Habu NHK Cup

The game score and a diagram showing the final position is given below.
Sente: Yoshiharu Habu NHK Cup
Gote: Akira Watanabe Ryūō
Opening: Double Fortress (相矢倉)
1.P-7f, 2. P-8d, 3. S-6h, 4. P-3d, 5. P-6f, 6. S-6b, 7. P-5f, 8. P-5d, 9. S-4h, 10. P-4b, 11. G-5h, 12. G-3b, 13. G-7h, 14. K-4a, 15. K-6i, 16. G-5b, 17. S-7g, 18. S-3c, 19. B-7i, 20. B-3a, 21. P-3f, 22. P-4d, 23 G5h-6g, 24. P-7c, 25. S-3g, 26. B-6d, 27. B-6h, 28. G5b-4c, 29. K-7i, 30. K-3a, 31. K-8h, 32. K-2b, 33. S-4f, 34. S-5c, 35. N-3g, 36. P-9d, 37. P-1f, 38. P-1d, 39. P-2f, 40. B-7c, 41. R-3h, 42. S-2d, 43. L-1h, 44. P-9e, 45. P-6e, 46. P-8e, 47. N-2e, 48. S-4b, 49. P-3e, 50. Sx3e, 51. Sx3e, 52. Px3e, 53. P-1e, 54. S*3g, 55. R-3i, 56. Px1e, 57. P-6d, 58. Bx6d, 59. Lx1e, 60. Lx1e, 61. S*6e, 62. Sx2f+, 63. Sx6d, 64. Px6d, 65. Rx3e, 66. S*2d, 67. N-1c+, 68. Nx1c, 69. P*1d, 70. Sx3e, 71. Bx3e, 72. P*1b, 73. Px1c+, 74. Px1c, 75. B*7a, 76. +S-2e, 77. B3ex4d, 78. Gx4d, 79. Bx4d+, 80. S-3c, 81. +B-7a, 82. R-4b, 83. P*3d, 84. Sx3d, 85. N*4f, 86. R*3i, 87. S*4h, 88. R-3f+, 89. +Bx8a, 90. P*4e, 91. Nx3d, 92. +Rx3d, 93. +Bx9a, 94. P-8f, 95. +Bx6d, 96. Px8g+, 97. Kx8g, 98. P*8e, 99. K-8h, 100. N*8f, 101. G7h-6h, 102. P-9f, 103. P*3e, 104. +Sx3e, 105. P*3f, 106. +Sx3f, 107. L*3i, 108. N*9e, 109. N*2f 110. +R-3e 111. Sx8f, 112. R-6b, 113. Sx9e, 114. Rx6d, 115. Lx3f, 116. +Rx3f, 117. S*4d, 118. P-1d, 119. N*3d, 120. K-1b, 121. S*3c, 122. L*8f, 123. Sx8f, 124. Px8f, 125. N*2d, 126. Px2d, 127. Sx3b, 128. P-8g+, 129. Kx8g, 130. L*8a, 131. P*8d, 132. Lx8d, 133. P*8e, 134. Rx6g+, 135. Gx6g, 136. Lx8e+, 137. Kx9f, 138. G*8f, 139. K-9e, 140. B*7c, 141. G*8d, 142. P*9d, 143. Kx9d, 144. B*7b, 145. L*8c, 146. P*9c, 147. Gx9c gote resigns (diagram)

The final tournament bracket is shown below.

61st NHK Cup TV Shogi Tournament bracket (final)

== Other ==
- Sente won 29 (almost 60%) of the 49 games.
- The average number of moves per main tournament game was 106. The most moves played in a single game was 157 (Rd. 1, Sugimoto 7d vs. Ina 6d) while the fewest moves played was 63 (Rd. 3, Watanabe Ryūō vs. Abe 5d).
- There were no replays resulting from repetition (千日手, sennichite) or impasse (持将棋, jishōgi), and there were no disqualifications due to illegal moves or time forfeits.
- The age breakdown (age at start of the tournament) for the players who qualified was as follows: 10–19 years old, 2 players; 20–29 years old, 15 players; 30–39 years old, 14 players; 40–49 years old, 17 players; 50–59 years old, 1 player; 60 years old or older, 1 player. The oldest player was Keiji Mori 9d (64 years old) and the youngest players were Tatsuya Sugai 4d and Takuya Nagase 4d (both 18 years old). (Note: Nagase was born in September 1992, and Sugai was born in April 1992)
- For only the second time in the history of a tournament, a "student" was paired against their "teacher" when Tatsuya Sugai played Keita Inoue in Rd. 2. (Note: A young amateur player aspiring to become a professional typically asks a more experienced professional to formally become their sponsor (i.e., teacher/mentor) and help them through the process. In some cases, the "student" may even decide to go live with their "teacher" and family.) The only other time this had occurred to date was when Daisuke Nakagawa beat his teacher Kunio Yonenaga in quarterfinals of the 45th NHK Cup (1995).

== See also ==
- 62nd NHK Cup (shogi)
- 63rd NHK Cup (shogi)
- 64th NHK Cup (shogi)
