= Takeshi Kawakami =

Japanese shogi player (born 1972)

- Native name: 川上猛
- Born: July 12, 1972 (age 54)
- Hometown: Adachi, Tokyo

Career
- Achieved professional status: April 1, 1993 (aged 20)
- Badge number: 206
- Rank: 7-dan
- Retired: September 16, 2025 (aged 53)
- Teacher: Hirokichi Hirano (7-dan)
- Career record: 426–431 (.497)

Websites
- JSA profile page

Takeshi Kawakami (川上 猛, Kawakami Takeshi; born July 12, 1972) is a Japanese retired professional shogi player who achieved the rank of 7-dan.

== Early life, amateur shogi and apprenticeship ==
Kawakami was born on July 12, 1972, in Adachi, Tokyo. As a junior high school first-grade student in 1985, he finished runner-up to fellow future shogi professional Nobuyuki Yashiki in the 10th Junior High School Student Meijin Tournament; the following year, however, he won the same tournament. In 1987, he was accepted into the Japan Shogi Association's apprentice school at the rank of 6-kyū under the guidance of Hirokichi Hirano. Promoted to apprentice professional 1-dan in 1990, he full professional status and the rank of 4-dan in 1993 after winning the 12th 3-dan League (October 1992 – March 1993) with a record of 15 wins and 3 losses.

== Shogi professional ==
Kawakami finished runner-up to Torahiko Tanaka in the 3rd Ginga-sen in 1994, but the tournament was not yet considered to be an official tournament at the time.

In 2013, he finished the 71st Meijin Class C2 league (April 2012 – March 2013) with a record of 2 wins and 8 losses, earning a third demotion point which meant automatic demotion to "Free Class" play.

On April 3, 2023, the JSA announced on its official website that Kawakami had met the Free Class criteria for mandatory retirement and that his retirement would become official upon completion of his last scheduled official game. (Note: Players demoted from Meijin Class C2 to Free Class need to be promoted back to Class C2 within ten years of their demotion to avoid mandatory retirement.) His retirement became official on September 16, 2025, following his loss to Wakamu Deguchi in a 38th Ryūō Group 5 promotion game. (Note: Players who have been Free Class players for ten years still competing in the Ryūō Group 4 league can avoid manadatory retirement up until the age of 60 as long as they retain their Group 4 status, while players competing in the Ryūō Group 5 league can avoid manadatory retirement for an additional two Ryūō Group 5 league seasons but need to avoid beoing demoted to Group 6 and be promoted back to Group 4 within two league seasons. Kawakami was competing in Ryūō Group 4 in 36th Ryūō tournament (2022–2023) during his tenth year as a Free Class Player but was demoted to Group 5 for the 37th Ryūō league and remained in Group 5 for the 38th Ryūō league. He needed to win his game against Deguchi to maintain his chances of being promoted back to Group 4 for the 39th Ryūō league and avoid manadatory retirement.) Kawakami finished his career with a record of 426 wins and 431 losses for a winning percentage of 0.497.

=== Promotion history ===
The promotion history for Kawakami is as follows:

- 6-kyū: 1987
- 1-dan: 1990
- 4-dan: April 1, 1993
- 5-dan: June 3, 1999
- 6-dan: September 20, 2005
- 7-dan: October 17, 2017
- Retired: September 16, 2025
