= Kisei (shogi) =

Shogi tournament

Kisei (棋聖) is one of the eight major titles in Japanese professional shogi. The word Kisei means an excellent player of shogi or go. Although 聖 can be translated as "sage", in this context it is probably better to see it in English as master or grandmaster, as in chess.

The Kisei tournament started in 1962. With the creation of the Kisei, there were five major title tournaments along with the Meijin, Tenth Dan (Ryūō), Ōshō, and Ōi titles. It was held twice a year until the year 1994. The challenger for Kisei title holder is determined by first, second, and final preliminary rounds. The player that wins three games out of five first in the championship will become the new Kisei title holder.

== Lifetime Kisei ==
The Lifetime Kisei (永世棋聖, eisei kisei) title is awarded to a player who has won Kisei Championship five times. Active players may qualify for this title, but it is only officially awarded upon their retirement or death.

The following professionals have qualified for this title:

- Yasuharu Ōyama (deceased)
- Makoto Nakahara (retired)
- Kunio Yonenaga (deceased)
- Yoshiharu Habu (active)
- Yasumitsu Satō (active)
- Sōta Fujii (active)

== Winners ==
No.	Year	Winner	Score	Opponent
1	1962	Yasuharu Ōyama	3-1	Masao Tsukada
2	1963 first	Yasuharu Ōyama (2)	3-0	Tatsuya Futakami
3	1963 second	Yasuharu Ōyama (3)	3-1	Kozō Masuda
4	1964 first	Yasuharu Ōyama (4)	3-2	Shigeru Sekine
5	1964 second	Yasuharu Ōyama (5)	3-0	So-etsu Homma
6	1965 first	Yasuharu Ōyama (6)	3-2	Kozō Masuda
7	1965 second	Yasuharu Ōyama (7)	3-2	Tatsuya Futakami
8	1966 first	Tatsuya Futakami	3-1	Yasuharu Ōyama
9	1966 second	Yasuharu Ōyama (8)	3-0	Tatsuya Futakami
10	1967 first	Michiyoshi Yamada	3-1	Yasuharu Ōyama
11	1967 second	Michiyoshi Yamada (2)	3-2	Makoto Nakahara
12	1968 first	Makoto Nakahara	3-1	Michiyoshi Yamada
13	1968 second	Makoto Nakahara (2)	3-1	Yasuharu Ōyama
14	1969 first	Makoto Nakahara (3)	3-0	Michiyoshi Yamada
15	1969 second	Kunio Naitō	3-1	Makoto Nakahara
16	1970 first	Yasuharu Ōyama (9)	3-1	Kunio Naitō
17	1970 second	Makoto Nakahara (4)	3-0	Yasuharu Ōyama
18	1971 first	Makoto Nakahara (5)	3-1	Yasuharu Ōyama
19	1971 second	Makoto Nakahara (6)	3-1	Tatsuya Futakami
20	1972 first	Makoto Nakahara (7)	3-1	Kunio Naitō
21	1972 second	Michio Ariyoshi	3-2	Makoto Nakahara
22	1973 first	Kunio Yonenaga	3-1	Michio Ariyoshi
23	1973 second	Kunio Naitō (2)	3-2	Kunio Yonenaga
24	1974 first	Yasuharu Ōyama (10)	3-1	Kunio Naitō
25	1974 second	Yasuharu Ōyama (11)	3-0	Kunio Yonenaga
26	1975 first	Yasuharu Ōyama (12)	3-1	Tatsuya Futakami
27	1975 second	Yasuharu Ōyama (13)	3-0	Tatsuya Futakami
28	1976 first	Yasuharu Ōyama (14)	3-1	Kiyozumi Kiriyama
29	1976 second	Yasuharu Ōyama (15)	3-2	Kunio Yonenaga
30	1977 first	Yasuharu Ōyama (16)	3-1	Keiji Mori
31	1977 second	Makoto Nakahara (8)	3-2	Yasuharu Ōyama
32	1978 first	Makoto Nakahara (9)	3-0	Michio Ariyoshi
33	1978 second	Makoto Nakahara (10)	3-1	Tatsuya Futakami
34	1979 first	Makoto Nakahara (11)	3-1	Hifumi Katō
35	1979 second	Makoto Nakahara (12)	3-0	Hitoshige Awaji
36	1980 first	Kunio Yonenaga (2)	3-1	Makoto Nakahara
37	1980 second	Tatsuya Futakami (2)	3-1	Kunio Yonenaga
38	1981 first	Tatsuya Futakami (3)	3-0	Makoto Nakahara
39	1981 second	Tatsuya Futakami (4)	3-0	Hifumi Katō
40	1982 first	Keiji Mori	3-0	Tatsuya Futakami
41	1982 second	Makoto Nakahara (13)	3-1	Keiji Mori
42	1983 first	Hidemitsu Moriyasu	3-2	Makoto Nakahara
43	1983 second	Kunio Yonenaga (3)	3-1	Hidemitsu Moriyasu
44	1984 first	Kunio Yonenaga (4)	3-0	Koji Tanigawa
45	1984 second	Kunio Yonenaga (5)	3-2	Osamu Nakamura
46	1985 first	Kunio Yonenaga (6)	3-1	Osamu Katsuura
47	1985 second	Kunio Yonenaga (7)	3-0	Osamu Nakamura
48	1986 first	Kiyozumi Kiriyama	3-1	Kunio Yonenaga
49	1986 second	Kiyozumi Kiriyama (2)	3-1	Yoshikazu Minami
50	1987 first	Kiyozumi Kiriyama (3)	3-0	Kazuyoshi Nishimura
51	1987 second	Yoshikazu Minami	3-0	Kiyozumi Kiriyama
52	1988 first	Torahiko Tanaka	3-2	Yoshikazu Minami
53	1988 second	Makoto Nakahara (14)	3-2	Torahiko Tanaka
54	1989 first	Makoto Nakahara (15)	3-1	Yoshikazu Minami
55	1989 second	Makoto Nakahara (16)	3-2	Nobuyuki Yashiki
56	1990 first	Nobuyuki Yashiki	3-2	Makoto Nakahara
57	1990 second	Nobuyuki Yashiki (2)	3-1	Taku Morishita
58	1991 first	Yoshikazu Minami (2)	3-2	Nobuyuki Yashiki
59	1991 second	Koji Tanigawa	3-0	Yoshikazu Minami
60	1992 first	Koji Tanigawa (2)	3-1	Masataka Gōda
61	1992 second	Koji Tanigawa (3)	3-0	Masataka Gōda
62	1993 first	Yoshiharu Habu	3-1	Koji Tanigawa
63	1993 second	Yoshiharu Habu (2)	3-2	Koji Tanigawa
64	1994 first	Yoshiharu Habu (3)	3-1	Koji Tanigawa
65	1994 second	Yoshiharu Habu (4)	3-0	Akira Shima
66	1995	Yoshiharu Habu (5)	3-0	Hiroyuki Miura
67	1996	Hiroyuki Miura	3-2	Yoshiharu Habu
68	1997	Nobuyuki Yashiki (3)	3-1	Hiroyuki Miura
69	1998	Masataka Gōda	3-0	Nobuyuki Yashiki
70	1999	Koji Tanigawa (4)	3-0	Masataka Gōda
71	2000	Yoshiharu Habu (6)	3-2	Koji Tanigawa
72	2001	Masataka Gōda (2)	3-2	Yoshiharu Habu
73	2002	Yasumitsu Satō	3-2	Masataka Gōda
74	2003	Yasumitsu Satō (2)	3-0	Tadahisa Maruyama
75	2004	Yasumitsu Satō (3)	3-0	Toshiyuki Moriuchi
76	2005	Yasumitsu Satō (4)	3-2	Yoshiharu Habu
77	2006	Yasumitsu Satō (5)	3-0	Daisuke Suzuki
78	2007	Yasumitsu Satō (6)	3-1	Akira Watanabe
79	2008	Yoshiharu Habu (7)	3-2	Yasumitsu Satō
80	2009	Yoshiharu Habu (8)	3-2	Kazuki Kimura
81	2010	Yoshiharu Habu (9)	3-0	Koichi Fukaura
82	2011	Yoshiharu Habu (10)	3-0	Koichi Fukaura
83	2012	Yoshiharu Habu (11)	3-0	Taichi Nakamura
84	2013	Yoshiharu Habu (12)	3-1	Akira Watanabe
85	2014	Yoshiharu Habu (13)	3-0	Toshiyuki Moriuchi
86	2015	Yoshiharu Habu (14)	3-1	Masayuki Toyoshima
87	2016	Yoshiharu Habu (15)	3-2	Takuya Nagase
88	2017	Yoshiharu Habu (16)	3-1	Shintaro Saito
89	2018	Masayuki Toyoshima	3-2	Yoshiharu Habu
90	2019	Akira Watanabe	3-1	Masayuki Toyoshima
91	2020	Sōta Fujii	3-1	Akira Watanabe
92	2021	Sōta Fujii (2)	3-0	Akira Watanabe
93	2022	Sōta Fujii (3)	3-1	Takuya Nagase
94	2023	Sōta Fujii (4)	3-1	Daichi Sasaki
95	2024	Sōta Fujii (5)	3-0	Takayuki Yamasaki
96	2025	Sōta Fujii (6)	3-0	Kazuo Sugimoto
97	2026	Sōta Fujii (7)	3-0	Shin'ichirō Hattori

== Records ==
- Most titles overall: Yasuharu Ōyama, Makoto Nakahara and Yoshiharu Habu, 16
- Most consecutive titles: Yoshiharu Habu, 10 in a row (2008-2017)

== See also ==
- Shogi
- Kisei (Go)
