= Yasumitsu Satō =

Japanese shogi player (born 1969)

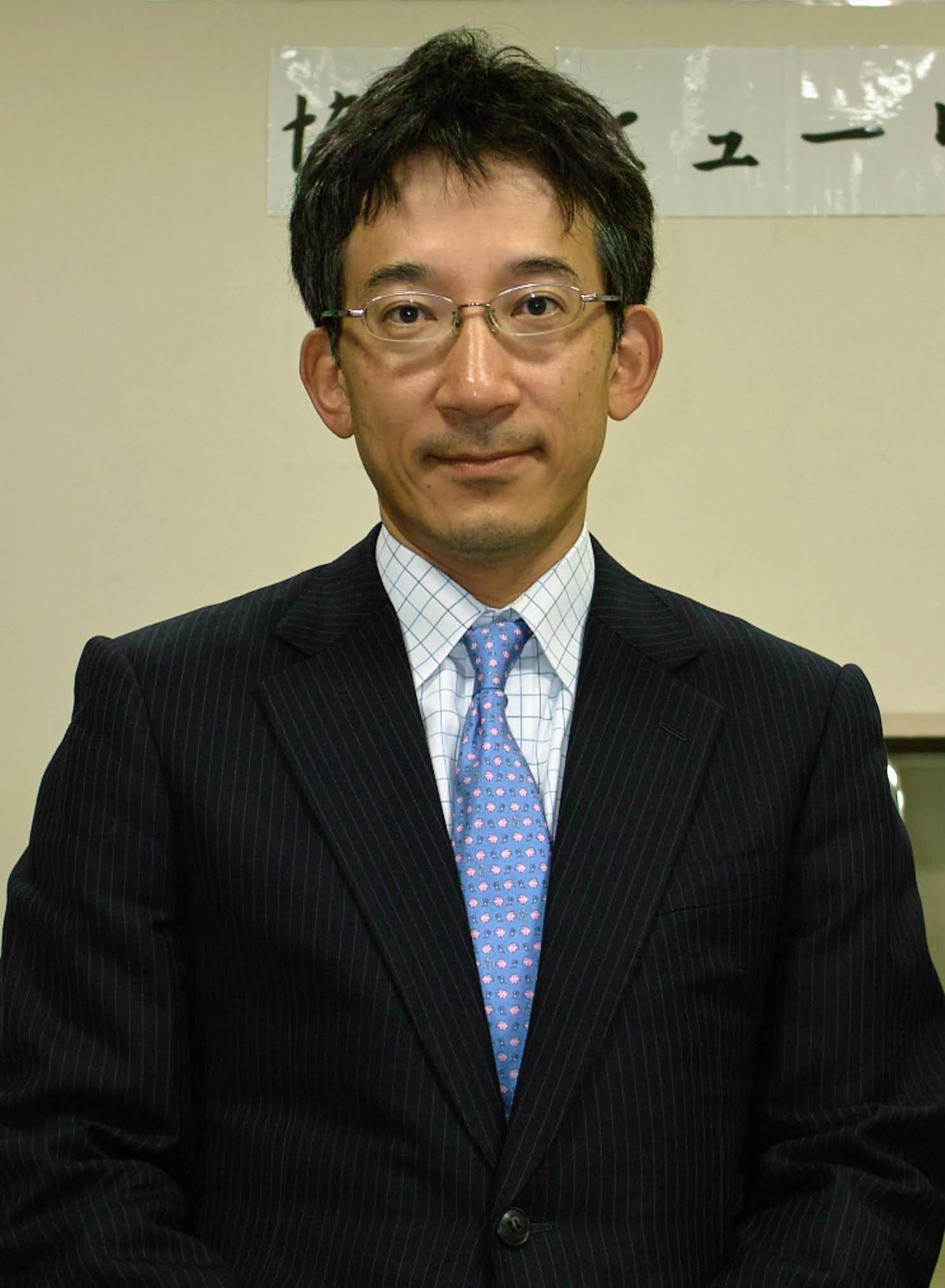
- Satō at an October 2015 event.
- Native name: 佐藤 康光
- Born: October 1, 1969 (age 56)
- Hometown: Yawata, Kyoto

Career
- Achieved professional status: March 25, 1987 (aged 17)
- Badge Number: 182
- Rank: 9 dan
- Teacher: Kaishū Tanaka
- Lifetime titles: Lifetime Kisei
- Major titles won: 13
- Tournaments won: 12
- Meijin class: B1
- Ryūō class: 1

Websites
- JSA profile page

Yasumitsu Satō (佐藤 康光, Satō Yasumitsu; born October 1, 1969) is a Japanese professional shogi player from Yawata City in Kyoto Prefecture, Japan, ranked 9-dan. He is a former president of the Japan Shogi Association as well as former holder of the Ryūō, Meijin, Oshō, Kisei, Kiō major titles. He has qualified for the Lifetime Kisei title.

== Early life, amateur shogi and apprentice professional ==
Satō was born in Yawata, Kyoto, on October 1, 1969. He finished third in the 6th Elementary Student Meijin Tournament in 1981. His experience in the tournament led him to want become a shogi professional, and he entered the Kansai branch of the Japan Shogi Association's apprentice school at the rank of 6-kyū in December 1982 as a protegee of shogi professional Kaishū Tanaka in December 1982.

== Shogi professional ==
Satō's first appearance a major title match was in 1990 as the challenger to Kōji Tanigawa for the 31st Ōi title, but he lost the match 4 games to 3. That same year, he won his first tournament as a professional when he defeated Toshiyuki Moriuchi to win the 9th Hayazashi Shinei Tournament, a quick-play type tournament for young players under the age of thirty. He repeated as champion the following year when he won the 10th Hayazashi Shinei Tournament when he defeated Taku Morishita in the final.

In 1993, Satō challenged Yoshiharu Habu for the 6th Ryūō title and won the match 4 games to 2 for his first major title. The same two players met in the title matches for the 7th Ryūō (1994) and 8th Ryūō (1995). Challenger Habu was able to recapture his title by the score of 4 games to 2 in 1994 and then defend it by the same score in 1995.

In 1997, Satō challenged Habu for the 38th Ōi title Habu, but lost the match by the score of 4 games to 1. The two met once again the following year for the 39th Ōi title, but Habu defended his title by the score 4 games to 2. That same year, Satō was the challenger to Habu for the 24th Kiō title, but lost the match 3 games to 0. Satō once again challenged Habu for the Kiō title in 2001. Satō won the first game of the 27th Kiō match, but Habu then won the next three games to defend his title.

In just his second year in Meijin Class A, Satō earned the right to challenge Tanigawa for the 56th Meijin title (1998) by defeating Habu in a one-game playoff after both players finished league play with a record of 6 wins and 3 losses. Satō then proceeded to defeat Tanigawa 4 games to 3 to win the Meijin title for the first time. The following year, Satō and Tanigawa met again for the 57th Meijin title (1999), with Satō defending his title by the score of 4 games to 3. Satō, however, was unable to successfully defend his title for the third consecutive year when he lost to Tadahisa Maruyama 4 games to 3 in the 58th Meijin title match (200).

Satō was the challenger in the 47th Ōshō (1997) and 49th Ōshō (1999) title matches against Habu, but lost by the scores of 4 games to 1 and 4 games to 0, respectively. In 2002, Satō finished the 51st Ōshō challenger league play undefeated with six wins to once again challenge to Habu for the title. Sato won the first two games of the match and then split the next four to win the match 4 games to 2, thus ending his title match losing streak to Habu at eight. The following year, however, Habu was successful in retaking the title from Satō, winning the 52nd Ōshō match 4 games to 0. Satō and Habu met again in 55th Ōshō (2006) and 56th Ōshō (2007) title matches with Habu defending his title each time by the score of 4 games to 3.

In 2007, Satō defeated Toshiyuki Moriuchi (the reigning Meijin at the time) to win the 56th NHK Cup Shogi TV tournament. He defeated Daisuke Suzuki the following year to defend his title and become just the third player ever to win the tournament in consecutive years, with the championship game between the two being the first NHK shogi tournament game ever to be broadcast live on TV. Satō won the tournament for a third time in 2017.

Satō became the ninth professional player to record 1000 victories in official games when he defeated Akihito Hirose in a Meijin Class A game on July 28, 2017. Satō is the first player to accomplish such a feat since Habu did so in 2007.

=== Playing style ===
He was known to use a lot of jōseki positions as a young player, but since 2005 he has often opted for choosing to play creatively with the standard strategies. His new move 5. P-96 for Cheerful Central Rook has been widely adopted by many professional players. From a young age he has been known for the depth of his reading, which is called his "minute" or "meticulous" style, and of which is said that he can "read a billion of three-move series in a second".

=== Promotion history ===
The promotion history of Satō is as follows:

- 6-kyū: December 1982
- 1-dan: July 1984
- 4-dan: May 25, 1987
- 5-dan: April 1, 1989
- 6-dan: May 25, 1992
- 7-dan: October 1, 1993
- 8-dan: April 1, 1996
- 9-dan: June 18, 1998

=== Titles and other championships ===
Satō has appeared in major title matches a total of 37 times. He has won the Kisei title six times and has qualified for the Lifetime Kisei title. He has also won the Meijin, Kiō and Ōshō titles twice each and the Ryūō title once. In addition to major titles, Satō has won twelve other shogi championships during his career.

==== Major titles ====
Title	Years	Number of times overall
Ryūō	1993	1
Meijin	1998–99	2
Kisei	2002–07	6
Kiō	2006–07	2
Ōshō	2001, 2011	2

==== Other championships ====
Tournament	Years	Number of times
^{*}Daiwa Securities Strongest Player Cup	2012	1
Ginga Tournament	2003, 2008, 2010	3
NHK Cup	2006–07, 2016	3
^{*}Hayazashi Shineisen	1990-91	2
JT Nihon Series	2004, 2006	2
^{*}All Star Kachinuki-sen	1999	1

Note: Tournaments marked with an asterisk (*) are no longer held.

=== Awards and honors ===
Satō has received numerous awards and honors throughout his career for his accomplishments in both on an off the shogi board. These include the Annual Shogi Awards given out by the JSA for performance in official games and other awards given out by governmental organizations, etc. for contributions made to Japanese society.

==== Annual Shogi Awards ====
- 18th Annual Awards (April 1990 － March 1991): Best New Player
- 20th Annual Awards (April 1992 － March 1993): Technique Award
- 21st Annual Awards (April 1993 － March 1994): Most Games Won, Most Games Played, Most Consecutive Games Won, Distinguished Service Award
- 23rd Annual Awards (April 1995 － March 1996): Technique Award
- 25th Annual Awards (April 1997 － March 1998): Technique Award
- 26th Annual Awards (April 1998 － March 1999): Distinguished Service Award
- 29th Annual Awards (April 2001 － March 2002): Most Consecutive Games Won, Technique Award
- 30th Annual Awards (April 2002 － March 2003): Fighting-spirit Award
- 32nd Annual Awards (April 2004 － March 2005): Technique Award
- 33rd Annual Awards (April 2005 － March 2006): Fighting-spirit Award
- 34th Annual Awards (April 2006 － March 2007): Player of the Year, Most Games Played, Most Games Won, Kōzō Masuda Award
- 35th Annual Awards (April 2007 － March 2008): Player of the Year
- 37th Annual Awards (April 2009 － March 2010): Game of the Year
- 39th Annual Awards (April 2011 － March 2012): Kōzō Masuda Award

==== Other awards ====
- 1998: Yawata City Meritorius Citizen Award
- 2003: Shogi Honor Fighting-spirit Award (Awarded by JSA in recognition of winning 600 official games as a professional)
- 2007: Kyoto Prefecture Culture Award
- 2009: Shogi Honor Fighting-spirit Award (Awarded by JSA in recognition of winning 800 official games as a professional)
- 2011: 25 Years Service Award (Awarded by the JSA in recognition of being an active professional for twenty-five years)
- 2017: Japanese government's Medal of Honor with Purple Ribbons

=== Year-end prize money and game fee ranking ===
Satō has finished in the "Top 10" of the JSA's year-end prize money and game fee rankings each year from 1993 to 2014, and then again in 2017. He also has finished in the "Top 3" eight times.

Year	Amount	Rank
1993	¥21,910,000	6th
1994	¥55,130,000	2nd
1995	¥33,720,000	5th
1996	¥31,040,000	5th
1997	¥26,510,000	6th
1998	¥57,370,000	3rd
1999	¥63,550,000	3rd
2000	¥47,440,000	4th
2001	¥25,670,000	7th
2002	¥55,130,000	2nd
2003	¥57,090,000	2nd
2004	¥40,510,000	4th
2005	¥50,400,000	4th
2006	¥75,760,000	2nd
2007	¥79,270,000	3rd
2008	¥60,820,000	3rd
2009	¥26,880,000	7th
2010	¥30,180,000	6th
2011	¥19,200,000	9th
2012	¥25,050,000	7th
2013	¥27,200,000	6th
2014	¥16,430,000	9th
2017	¥19, 670,000	10th

- Note: All amounts are given in Japanese yen and include prize money and fees earned from official tournaments and games held from January 1 to December 31.

== JSA president ==
Satō served as the chairman of the Shogi Professional Players' Association from April 2011 until January 2017. He announced his candidacy for the JSA's board of directors on January 19, 2017, a day after Kōji Tanigawa announced his resignation as JSA president to accept responsibility for the 29th Ryūō challenger controversy.

Satō was elected to the JSA's board of directors at an emergency meeting of the organization's members on February 6, 2017, and was later chosen by the board at a meeting held the same day to serve out the remainder of Tanigawa's term as JSA president. He was re-elected as president for a full two-year term at the JSA's general meeting on May 29, 2017, as well as again in June 2019 and June 2021.

In April 2023, Satō announced that was not going to seek another term as JSA president when his current term ended at the beginning of June 2023. He stated that he "didn't think he would be president for such a long period of time", and that he "started thinking about not running again around the beginning of the year". He also stated "this was a good time for a change to let someone else become president given that the JSA would be celebrating its 100th anniversary in 2024".
