= Nobuyuki Yashiki =

Japanese shogi player

- Native name: 屋敷伸之
- Born: January 18, 1972 (age 54)
- Hometown: Sapporo

Career
- Achieved professional status: October 1, 1988 (aged 16)
- Badge number: 189
- Rank: 9-dan
- Teacher: Toyoichi Igarashi (9-dan)
- Major titles won: 3
- Tournaments won: 2
- Meijin class: B2
- Ryūō class: 3
- Notable students: Sae Itō

Websites
- JSA profile page

Nobuyuki Yashiki (屋敷 伸之, Yashiki Nobuyuki; January 18, 1972) is a Japanese professional shogi player ranked 9-dan. He is a former Kisei title holder and also holds the professional shogi record for being the fastest to win a major title since turning professional.

== Early life, amateur shogi and apprenticeship ==
Yashiki was born in Sapporo on January 18, 1972. As a sixth-grade student, he finished third in the 8th Elementary Student Meijin Tournament in 1983, but won the 10th Junior High School Student Meijin Tournament two years later as a junior high school eight-grade student in 1985. That same year, he entered the Japan Shogi Association's apprentice school at the rank of 6-kyū under the guidance of Toyoichi Igarashi. Yashiki obtained the rank of 1-dan in March 1987 and was awarded full professional status and the rank of 4-dan in October 1988.

== Shogi professional ==
Yashiki's first appearance came in November 1989 when he challenged Makoto Nakahara for the 55th Kisei title. Although Yashiki lost the match 3 games to 2, he appearance made him at age 17 years 11 months the youngest player ever to challenge for a major title at that time (Note: Yashiki held the record for 31 years until Sōta Fujii broke it by four days on June 4, 2020.) as well as the fastest (1 year 2 months and 11 days) to do so after being promoted to 4-dan.

Yashiki faced Nakahara once again in the 56th Kisei title match in June 1990. Nakahara won the first two games, but Yashiki came back to win the next three to take the title. Yashiki's victory made him at the age of 18 years 6 months the youngest player to ever win a major title match at that time. (Note: Yashiki held the record until July 2020 when it was also broken by Fujii. Fujii was 17 years and 11 months old when he won the 91st Kisei title on July 16, 2020.) Yashiki also set the record for shortest time between turning professional and winning a major title at 1 year 10 months. Later that same year in November, Yashiki successfully defended his title by beating Taku Morishita 3 games to 1 in the 57th Kisei title match, thus making him the youngest player to ever defend a major title. However, Yashiki was unable to defend his title for a second consecutive time in the following June when he lost the 58th Kisei title match to Yoshikazu Minami 3 games to 1.

In 1997, Yashiki defeated Masataka Gōda to advance to the 68th Kisei title match against Hiroyuki Miura. Yashiki defeated Miura 3 games to 1 to recapture the Kisei title. He was, however, unable to defend the title the following year, losing the 69th Kisei title to Gōda 3 games to 0.

In 2001, Yashiki defeated Toshiyuki Moriuchi to advance to the 42nd Ōi match against Yoshiharu Habu, but was defeated 4 games to 0.

On March 18, 2021, Yashiki defeated Chikara Akutsu in a preliminary round game for the 71st Ōshō tournament to become the 23rd professional to win 800 career games.

=== Promotion history ===
Yashiki's promotion history is as follows:

- 6-kyū: 1985
- 1-dan: 1987
- 4-dan: October 1, 1988
- 5-dan: April 1, 1990
- 6-dan: November 25, 1991
- 7-dan: March 8, 1996
- 8-dan: May 13, 2002
- 9-dan: April 1, 2004

=== Titles and other championships ===
Yashiki has appeared in major title matches seven times, and he is a three-time winner of the Kisei title. In addition to major titles, Yashiki has won two other shogi championships during his career.

=== Awards and honors ===
Yashiki has won a number awards and honors throughout his career for his accomplishments both on an off the shogi board. These include awards given out annually by the JSA for performance in official games as well as other awards for achievement, and other awards given out by governmental organizations, etc. for contributions made to Japanese society.

==== Annual shogi awards ====
- 17th Annual Awards (April 1989 – March 1990): Best New Player
- 18th Annual Awards (April 1990 – March 1991): Fighting-spirit Award
- 24th Annual Awards (April 1996 – March 1997): Fighting-spirit Award
- 25th Annual Awards (April 1997 – March 1998): Most Consecutive Games Won, Distinguished Service Award

==== Other awards ====
- 1991, January: Hokkaido Prefectural Government's "Eiyo wo Tataete" Award
- 2009: Shogi Honor Fighting-spirit Award (Awarded by JSA in recognition of winning 600 official games as a professional)

=== Year-end prize money and game fee ranking ===
Yashiki has finished in the "Top 10" of the JSA's year-end prize money/game fee rankings three times since 1993: sixth in 1996 with JPY 27,890,000 in earnings, third in 1997 with JPY 35,550,000 in earnings, and fifth in 1998 with JPY 29,370,000 in earnings.
