= Ōshō (shogi) =

Japanese professional title

- Native name: 王将戦
- Type: Title
- Official name: ALSOK王将戦
- Sponsor(s): Mainichi Shimbun; Sports Nippon; ALSOK
- Winner's title: Ōshō
- Reigning champion: Sōta Fujii
- Number of times held: 74
- First held: Non-title (1950); Title (1951)
- Last held: 2024
- Lifetime champions: Yasuharu Ōyama; Yoshiharu Habu
- Most times won: Yasuharu Ōyama (20)
- Most consecutive wins: Yasuharu Ōyama (9)

Website(s)
- JSA tournament website (in Japanese)
- Sponsor's tournament website (in Japanese)

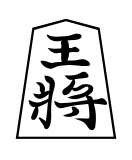
The "King" in shogi

Ōshō (王将, ōshō) is one of the eight titles in Japanese professional shogi. The tournament is co-sponsored by Sports Nippon and the Mainichi Shimbun with additional support received from ALSOK and the Igo & Shogi Channel.

The word also refers to the piece called the "King" in shogi.

== History ==
The tournament was first held in 1950 as a non-title tournament. The following year in 1951, it was elevated to major title status as the third major title along with the Meijin and Tenth Dan (later Ryūō) title tournaments.

== Format ==
The tournament is open to all shogi professionals (正棋士, seikishi) and takes place in four stages. The first and second preliminary rounds consist of multiple single-elimination tournaments in which the first round winners advance to compete against each other in the second round. The three winners of the second round tournaments then advance to a round-robin league called the "challenger league (挑戦者決定リーグ戦, Chōsensha Kettei Rīgusen)" along with four seeded players. The winner of the challenger league then advances to a best-of-seven championship match against the reigning Ōshō title holder. If two players or more finish tied for first in the challenger league, a single-game playoff between the two highest seeded players is held to determine the challenger. The time controls are three hours per player for the two preliminary rounds, four hours per player for the challenger league, and eight hours per player for the championship match. The championship match is held from January to March.

== Winners ==
The following is a list of the winners and runners-up for past Ōshō title matches.

No.	Year	Winner	Score	Opponent
1	1951	Kōzō Masuda	4-1	Yoshio Kimura
2	1952	Yasuharu Oyama	4-3	Yuzo Maruta
3	1953	Yasuharu Oyama (2)	4-2	Kozo Masuda
4	1954	Yasuharu Oyama (3)	4-1	Shigeyuki Matsuda
5	1955	Kozo Masuda (2)	3-0	Yasuharu Oyama
6	1956	Kozo Masuda (3)	4-2	Yasuharu Oyama
7	1957	Yasuharu Oyama (4)	4-3	Kozo Masuda
8	1958	Yasuharu Oyama (5)	3-0	Kazukiyo Takashima
9	1959	Yasuharu Oyama (6)	4-2	Tatsuya Futakami
10	1960	Yasuharu Oyama (7)	4-2	Tatsuya Futakami
11	1961	Yasuharu Oyama (8)	3-0	Hifumi Kato
12	1962	Tatsuya Futakami	4-2	Yasuharu Oyama
13	1963	Yasuharu Oyama (9)	3-0	Tatsuya Futakami
14	1964	Yasuharu Oyama (10)	4-1	Hiroji Kato
15	1965	Yasuharu Oyama (11)	4-3	Michiyoshi Yamada
16	1966	Yasuharu Oyama (12)	4-1	Hifumi Kato
17	1967	Yasuharu Oyama (13)	4-2	Hifumi Kato
18	1968	Yasuharu Oyama (14)	4-0	Kunio Naitō
19	1969	Yasuharu Oyama (15)	4-1	Tatsuya Futakami
20	1970	Yasuharu Oyama (16)	4-3	Makoto Nakahara
21	1971	Yasuharu Oyama (17)	4-3	Michio Ariyoshi
22	1972	Makoto Nakahara	4-0	Yasuharu Oyama
23	1973	Makoto Nakahara (2)	4-2	Kunio Yonenaga
24	1974	Makoto Nakahara (3)	4-3	Kunio Yonenaga
25	1975	Makoto Nakahara (4)	4-1	Michio Ariyoshi
26	1976	Makoto Nakahara (5)	4-2	Yasuharu Oyama
27	1977	Makoto Nakahara (6)	4-2	Michio Ariyoshi
28	1978	Hifumi Kato	4-1	Makoto Nakahara
29	1979	Yasuharu Oyama (18)	4-2	Hifumi Kato
30	1980	Yasuharu Oyama (19)	4-1	Kunio Yonenaga
31	1981	Yasuharu Oyama (20)	4-3	Makoto Nakahara
32	1982	Kunio Yonenaga	4-1	Yasuharu Oyama
33	1983	Kunio Yonenaga (2)	4-1	Keiji Mori
34	1984	Makoto Nakahara (7)	4-1	Kunio Yonenaga
35	1985	Osamu Nakamura	4-2	Makoto Nakahara
36	1986	Osamu Nakamura (2)	4-2	Makoto Nakahara
37	1987	Yoshikazu Minami	4-3	Osamu Nakamura
38	1988	Yoshikazu Minami (2)	4-0	Akira Shima

No.	Year	Winner	Score	Opponent
39	1989	Kunio Yonenaga (3)	4-3	Yoshikazu Minami
40	1990	Yoshikazu Minami (3)	4-2	Kunio Yonenaga
41	1991	Koji Tanigawa	4-1	Yoshikazu Minami
42	1992	Koji Tanigawa (2)	4-0	Satoshi Murayama
43	1993	Koji Tanigawa (3)	4-2	Makoto Nakahara
44	1994	Koji Tanigawa (4)	4-3	Yoshiharu Habu
45	1995	Yoshiharu Habu	4-0	Koji Tanigawa
46	1996	Yoshiharu Habu (2)	4-0	Koji Tanigawa
47	1997	Yoshiharu Habu (3)	4-1	Yasumitsu Sato
48	1998	Yoshiharu Habu (4)	4-1	Taku Morishita
49	1999	Yoshiharu Habu (5)	4-0	Yasumitsu Sato
50	2000	Yoshiharu Habu (6)	4-1	Koji Tanigawa
51	2001	Yasumitsu Sato	4-2	Yoshiharu Habu
52	2002	Yoshiharu Habu (7)	4-0	Yasumitsu Sato
53	2003	Toshiyuki Moriuchi	4-2	Yoshiharu Habu
54	2004	Yoshiharu Habu (8)	4-0	Toshiyuki Moriuchi
55	2005	Yoshiharu Habu (9)	4-3	Yasumitsu Sato
56	2006	Yoshiharu Habu (10)	4-3	Yasumitsu Sato
57	2007	Yoshiharu Habu (11)	4-1	Toshiaki Kubo
58	2008	Yoshiharu Habu (12)	4-3	Koichi Fukaura
59	2009	Toshiaki Kubo	4-2	Yoshiharu Habu
60	2010	Toshiaki Kubo (2)	4-2	Masayuki Toyoshima
61	2011	Yasumitsu Sato (2)	4-1	Toshiaki Kubo
62	2012	Akira Watanabe	4-1	Yasumitsu Sato
63	2013	Akira Watanabe (2)	4-3	Yoshiharu Habu
64	2014	Masataka Gōda	4-3	Akira Watanabe
65	2015	Masataka Gōda (2)	4-2	Yoshiharu Habu
66	2016	Toshiaki Kubo (3)	4-2	Masataka Gōda
67	2017	Toshiaki Kubo (4)	4-2	Masayuki Toyoshima
68	2018	Akira Watanabe (3)	4-0	Toshiaki Kubo
69	2019	Akira Watanabe (4)	4-3	Akihito Hirose
70	2020	Akira Watanabe (5)	4-2	Takuya Nagase
71	2021	Sōta Fujii	4-0	Akira Watanabe
72	2022	Sōta Fujii (2)	4-2	Yoshiharu Habu
73	2023	Sōta Fujii (3)	4-0	Tatsuya Sugai
74	2024	Sōta Fujii (4)	4-1	Takuya Nagase
75	2025	Sōta Fujii (5)	4-3	Takuya Nagase

== Records ==
- Most titles overall: Yasuharu Oyama, 20
- Most consecutive titles: Yasuharu Oyama, 9 in a row (1963-1971)

== Lifetime Ōshō ==
"Lifetime Ōshō" (永世王将, Eisei Ōshō) is the title given to a player who has won the championship ten times. An active player may qualify for the title, but it is only officially awarded upon retirement or death. Yasuharu Oyama and Yoshiharu Habu are the only players who have qualified for this title: Oyama qualified in 1973 and Habu qualified for the title in 2007.

== Parallel in amateur shogi ==
There is a separate tournament held each year for amateurs called the Amateur Osho Tournament which is sponsored by the Japan Shogi Association with support from the Igo & Shogi Channel. The winner is awarded the title "Amateur Ōshō" (アマ王将, Ama Ōshō).
