= Taku Morishita =

Japanese shogi player (born 1966)

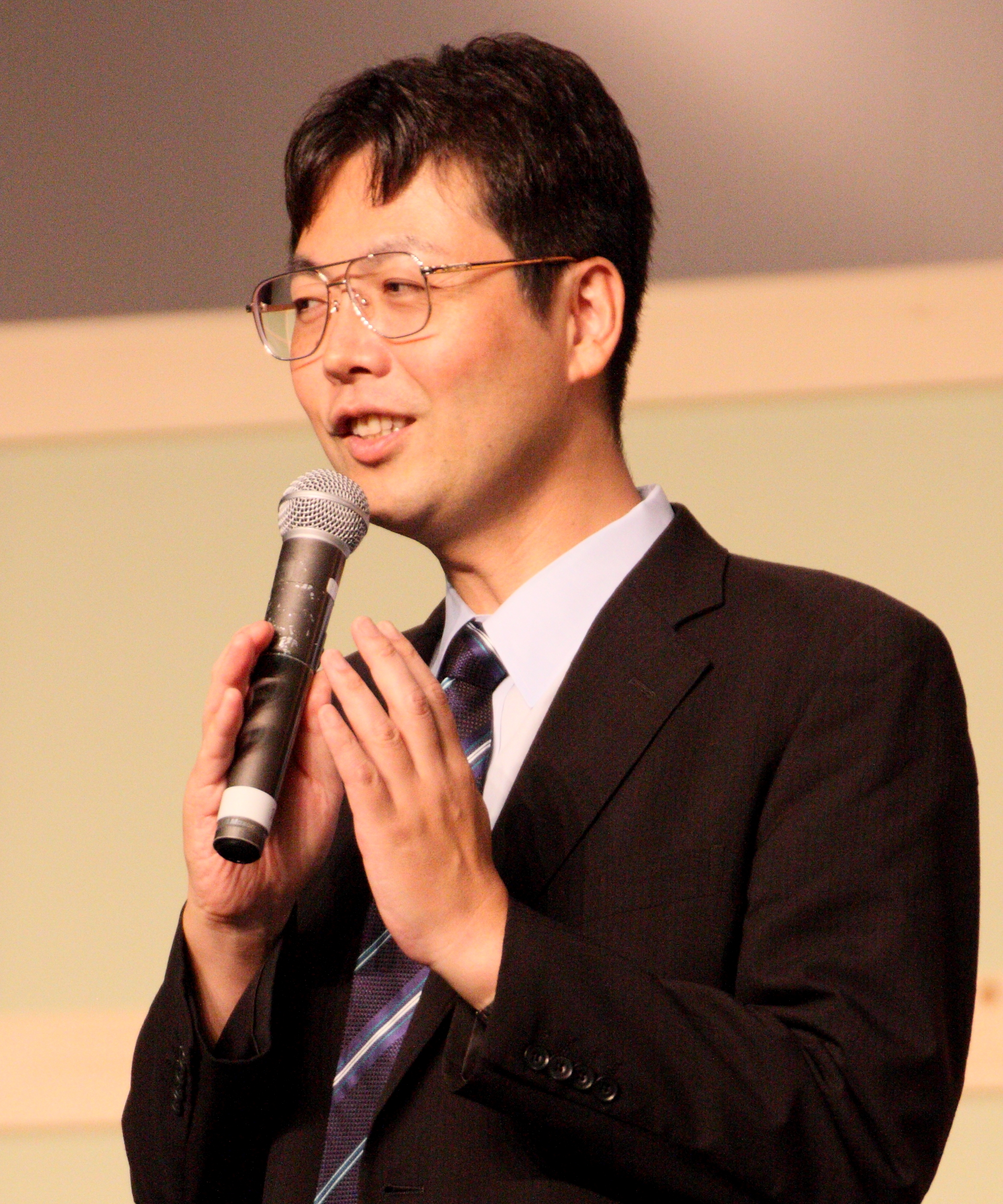
- Morishita in August 2014
- Native name: 森下卓
- Born: July 10, 1966 (age 59)
- Hometown: Kokura

Career
- Achieved professional status: September 21, 1983 (aged 17)
- Badge Number: 161
- Rank: 9 dan
- Teacher: Motoji Hanamura (9-dan)
- Tournaments won: 8
- Meijin class: C2
- Ryūō class: 6
- Notable students: Yasuhiro Masuda

Websites
- JSA profile page

Taku Morishita (森下 卓, Morishita Taku; born July 10, 1966) is a Japanese professional shogi player ranked 9-dan. He is a former director of the Japanese Shogi Association, and has been serving as the association's executive director since May 2017.

== Early life ==
Taku Morishita was born in Kokura, Kitakyushu on July 10, 1966. In September 1978, he entered the Japan Shogi Association's apprentice school at the rank of 6-kyū under guidance of shogi professional Motoji Hanamura. He was promoted to the 1-dan in June 1981, and obtained professional status and the rank of 4-dan in September 1983.

== Shogi professional ==
In 1985, Morishita advanced to the championship match of the 16th Shinjin-Ō tournament, but lost to Keita Inoue 2 games to 1. Five years later in October 1990, Morishita faced Yaichio Ōno in the championship match of 21st Shinjin-Ō tournament, winning 2 games to 1 for his first tournament championship as a professional. The following year, Morishita met Toshiyuki Moriuchi in the championship match of the 22nd Shinjin-Ō tournament, but lost 2 games to none.

Morishita made his first appearance in a major title match in 1990 when he challenged Nobuyuki Yashiki for the 57th Kisei title, but lost the match 3 games to 1.

In 1991, Morishita earned the right to challenge Koji Tanigawa for the 4th Ryūō title. Game 1 was played in Bangkok and ended in impasse. The match was tied at two wins apiece after five games, but Tanigawa won the next two games to defend his title 4 games to 2.

In 1995, Morishita was the challenger for the 53rd Meijin title against Yoshiharu Habu, but Habu successfully defended his title 4 games to 1.

In 2007, Morishita defeated Moriuchi to win the 28th Nihon Series tournament. The following year he defeated Kōichi Fukaura to win the 29th Nihon Series tournament and repeat as champion.

In August 2010, Morishita defeated Takeshi Kawakami in a preliminary round game of the 4th Asahi Cup Open tournament to become the fourteenth professional shogi player to win 800 official games.

On March 11, 2025, Morishita defeated Yūta Ishikawa in the final round of the 83rd Meijin Class C2 League play to become the twelfth professional to win 1000 official games.

=== Promotion history ===
The promotion history for Morishita is as follows:

- 6-kyū: 1978
- 1-dan: 1981
- 4-dan: September 21, 1983
- 5-dan: January 14, 1987
- 6-dan: October 3, 1989
- 7-dan: July 10, 1992
- 8-dan: April 1, 1994
- 9-dan: December 12, 2003

=== Titles and other championships ===
Morishita has appeared in major title matches a total of six times, but has not won any major titles. He has, however, won eight non-major shogi championships during his career.

=== Awards and honors ===
Morishita has received a number of awards and honors throughout his career for his accomplishments both on an off the shogi board. These include the Annual Shogi Awards given out by the JSA for performance in official games as well as other JSA awards for career accomplishments.

==== Annual Shogi Awards ====
- 15th Annual Awards (April 1987 – March 1988): Best New Player
- 17th Annual Awards (April 1989 – March 1990): Fighting-spirit
- 18th Annual Awards (April 1990 – March 1991): Best Winning Percentage, Most Games Won, Most Games Played, Distinguished Service Award
- 19th Annual Awards (April 1991 – March 1992): Technique Award
- 22nd Annual Awards (April 1994 – March 1995): Technique Award

==== Other awards ====
- 2000: Shogi Honor Fighting-spirit Award (Awarded by JSA in recognition of winning 600 official games as a professional)
- 2008: 25 Years Service Award (Awarded by the JSA in recognition of being an active professional for twenty-five years)
- 2010: Shogi Honor Fighting-spirit Award (Awarded by JSA in recognition of winning 800 official games as a professional)

=== Year-end prize money and game fee ranking ===
Morishita has finished in the "Top 10" of the JSA's year-end prize money and game fee rankings a number of times since 1993.

Year	Amount	Rank
1995	¥34,100,000	4th
1997	¥31,480,000	5th
1999	¥21,440,000	9th
2000	¥18,820,000	10th
2001	¥18,180,000	10th
2002	¥23,710,000	10th
2004	¥17,850,000	9th
2006	¥19,890,000	10th

- Note: All amounts are given in Japanese yen and include prize money and fees earned from official tournaments and games held from January 1 to December 31.

== JSA director ==
Morishita was elected to the Japan Shogi Association's board of directors as a director at the association's 56th General Meeting for a two-year term on May 26, 2005.

He was elected to the board once again in May 2017 as an executive director, and then re-elected for additional two-year terms in June 2019, June 2021, June 2023 and June 2025.
