= Toshiyuki Moriuchi =

Japanese shogi and chess player (born 1970)

- 森内俊之
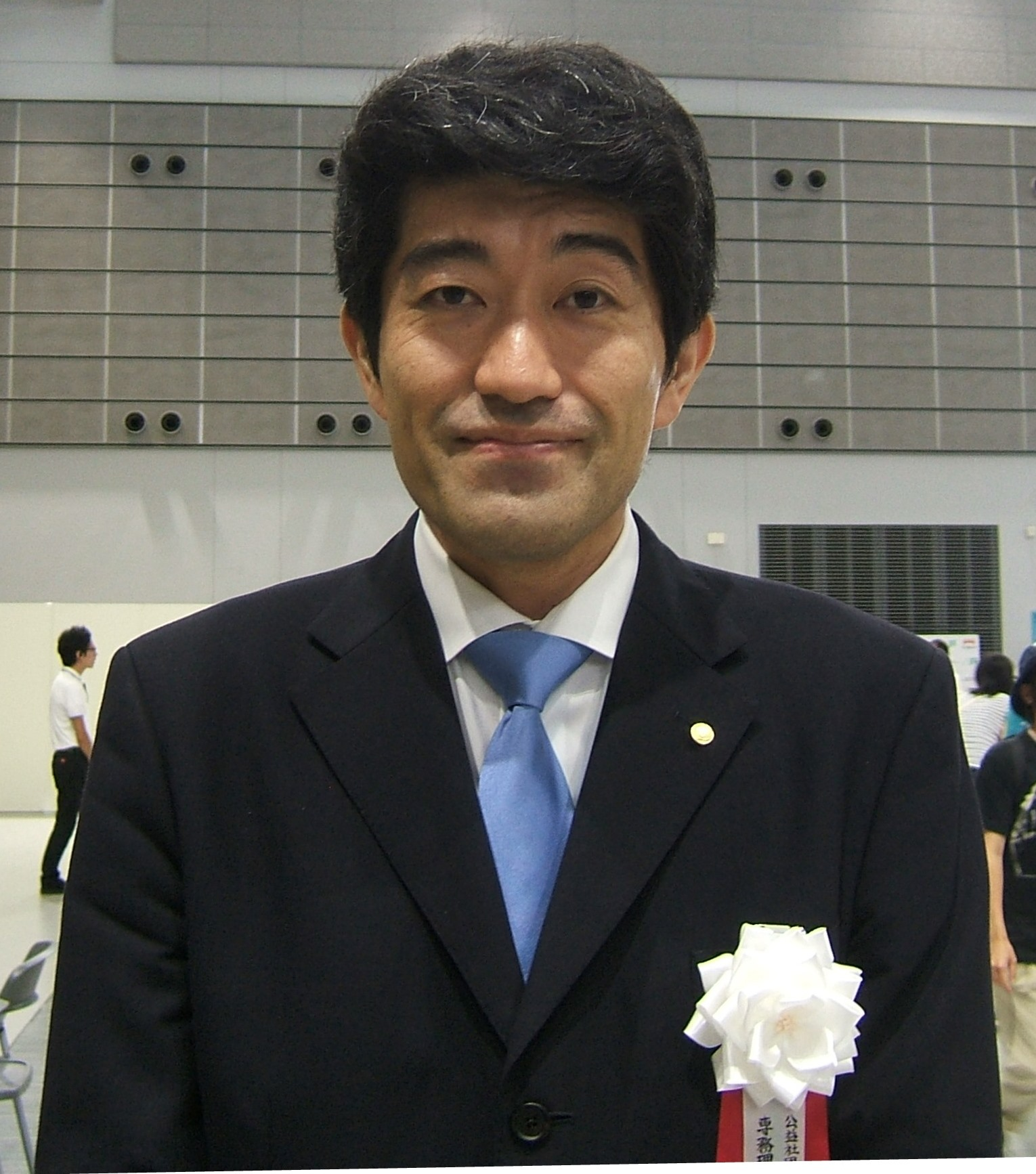
- Moriuchi at a children's shogi tournament in July 2018
- Born: October 10, 1970 (age 55); Yokohama, Japan

Career
- Achieved professional status: May 13, 1987 (aged 16)
- Badge number: 183
- Rank: 9-dan
- Teacher: Osamu Katsūra (9-dan)
- Lifetime titles: Lifetime Meijin
- Major titles won: 12
- Tournaments won: 14
- Meijin class: Free
- Ryūō class: 1
- Notable students: Beni Takemata; Miran Nohara

Websites
- JSA profile page
- Official website
- Chess career
- Country: Japan
- Peak rating: 2331 (October 2006)

Toshiyuki Moriuchi (森内 俊之, Moriuchi Toshiyuki; born October 10, 1970) is a Japanese professional shogi player, ranked 9-dan. He is a Lifetime Meijin who won the title eight times, and also a former Ryūō, Kiō and Ōshō title holder. He is also a former senior managing director of the Japan Shogi Association.

== Early life ==
Moriuchi was born on October 10, 1970, in Yokohama. His grandfather was shogi professional Yukio Kyōsu, who died about ten years before Moriuchi was born. When Moriuchi was young and would visit his grandmother's house, she would show him old issues of Shogi World that she had kept, and this is when Moriuchi first became interested in shogi.

Moriuchi started playing in shogi tournaments as an elementary school student and it was there that his rivalry with Yoshiharu Habu began. Habu lived in neighboring Tokyo and was the same age, so the two often participated in the same tournaments. Moriuchi even went to watch Habu win a tournament whose entry was limited to Tokyo residents only. The following year, Moriuchi defeated Habu in the finals of the same tournament after it had been changed to an open tournament allowing anyone to participate.

In 1982, Moriuchi finished tied for third in the 7th Elementary Student Shogi Meijin Tournament. Both Moriuchi and Habu advanced to the semi-finals held in Tokyo which were broadcast on television. Moriuchi, however, lost his semi-final game, whereas Habu won his and then subsequently the final to become the "7th Elementary School Shōgi Meijin". That same year, Moriuchi entered the Japan Shogi Association's apprentice school with the rank of 6-kyū as a protegee of shogi professional Osamu Katsūra. He was awarded professional status and the rank of 4-dan in May 1987.

== Shogi professional ==
In 1987, Moriuchi won his first professional shogi tournament when he defeated Hiroyuki Iida 2 games to none to win the 18th Shinjin-Ō, but was unable to repeat as champion the following year when he lost the 19th Shinjin-Ō to Habu 2 games to none in the first match between the two as professionals. Moriuchi would, however, win the tournament again in 1991 (against Taku Morishita, 2–0) and 1993 (against Yasumitsu Satō, 2–1).

In 1988, Moriuchi defeated then Meijin Kōji Tanigawa 2 games to 1 to win the 7th All Nihon Pro. The victory was much discussed through the year in professional shogi circles because Moriuchi ranked 4-dan at the time had defeated the reigning Meijin in a match. Tanigawa would get his chance for revenge against Moriuchi in 19th All Nihon Pro Tournament final in 2000, but was defeated 3 games to 2.

Moriuchi's first appearance in a major title match was the 54th Meijin Match in June 1996. Moriuchi was promoted to the Class A League for the first time in 1995 and went on to win the league in his first season with a 7–2 record to advance to the title match against Habu. Although both players were the same age and had been rivals since elementary school, Habu was much more establish as a professional and was also a 7-crown title holder (i.e., simultaneously held all seven major titles) at the time. Moriuchi ended up losing the matchi 4–1.

Moriuchi became the fifteenth shogi professional to win 800 official games when he defeated Yoshiharu Habu in Game 2 of 69th Meijin title match on April 21, 2011.

In March 2017, Moriuchi voluntarily declared himself as a free class player, thus leaving the Meijin tournament league.

On February 20, 2025, Moriuchi became the eleventh professional to win 1000 official games. The JSA announced that next day that Moriuchi would receive the "Special Shogi Honor Award" for this achievement. His career record at the time of the victory was 1000 wins and 636 losses for a winning percentage of 0.611.

On December 7, 2025, Moriuchi defeated Habu to win the 3rd Tatsujin Tournament; it was his first time winning the tournament and his first tournament championship in ten years.

=== Playing style ===
Moriuchi is considered an all-around player proficient at both Static Rook and Ranging Rook strategies. Although he's widely known as defensively strong player, his style often called "iron-clad" or "steel defense"; in the opinion of shogi professionals Hirotaka Nozuki and Akihito Hirose, however, his most characteristic trait is his ability to switch from defense to attack. His so-called "strong" style is often contrasted with the "gentle" one of Yoshiharu Habu.

Moriuchi is also well known for the Moriuchi Fortress variation which is characterized by pushing the pawn at the ninth file with P. 9d instead of the traditional P-8e, followed then by a knight jump to 9-c and then 8e.

=== Promotion history ===
The promotion history for Moriuchi is as follows:

- 6-kyū: 1982
- 1-dan: 1985
- 4-dan: May 13, 1987
- 5-dan: June 2, 1990
- 6-dan: April 1, 1992
- 7-dan: April 1, 1994
- 8-dan: April 1, 1995
- 9-dan: May 17, 2002

=== Titles and other championships ===
Moriuchi has appeared in major title matches a total of 25 times. He has won the Meijin title eight times, thus qualifying for the Lifetime Meijin title. He has also won the Ryūō title twice, and the Kiō and the Ōshō titles once each. In addition to major titles, Moriuchi has won fourteen other shogi championships during his career.

==== Major titles ====
Title	Years	Number of times overall
Meijin	2002, 2004–07, 2011–2013	8
Ryūō	2003, 2013	2
Kiō	2005	1
Ōshō	2003	1

==== Other championships ====
Tournament	Years	Number of times
NHK Cup	1996, 2001, 2014	3
Shinjin-Ō	1987, 1991, 1993	3
Tatsujin Tournament	2025	1
^{*}Quick Play Young Professionals Tournament	1988–1989	2
^{*}All Nihon Pro	1988, 2000	2
Nihon Series	2000	1
^{*}Hayazashi Senshuken	1991	1
^{*}All Star Kachinuki-sen	1990	1

Note: Tournaments marked with an asterisk (*) are no longer held.

=== Awards and honors ===
Moriuchi has received a number of awards and honors throughout his career for his accomplishments both on an off the shogi board. These include awards given out annually by the JSA for performance in official games as well as other JSA awards for career accomplishments, and awards received from governmental organizations, etc. for contributions made to Japanese society.

==== Annual Shogi Awards ====
- 16th Annual Awards (April 1988 – March 1989): Best New Player
- 19th Annual Awards (April 1991 – March 1992): Best Winning Percentage, Most Games Won, Most Games Played, Distinguished Service Award
- 21st Annual Awards (April 1993 – March 1994): Technique Award
- 24th Annual Awards (April 1996 – March 1997): Technique Award
- 29th Annual Awards (April 2001 – March 2002): Fighting-spirit Award
- 30th Annual Awards (April 2002 – March 2003): Technique Award
- 31st Annual Awards (April 2003 – March 2004): Player of the Year, Most Games Won, Most Games Played
- 33rd Annual Awards (April 2005 – March 2006): Excellent Player
- 38th Annual Awards (April 2010 – March 2011): Game of the Year Special Prize
- 41st Annual Awards (April 2013 – March 2014): Player of the Year

==== Other awards ====
- 2004: Shogi Honor Award (Awarded by the JSA in recognition of winning 600 official games as a professional)
- 2011: Shogi Honor Fighting-spirit Award (Awarded by JSA in recognition of winning 800 official games as a professional)
- 2012: 25 Years Service Award (Awarded by the JSA in recognition of being an active professional for twenty-five years)
- 2017: Medal with Purple Ribbon: (Awarded by the Government of Japan to individuals who have done meritorious deeds or have achieved excellence in their profession)

=== Year-end shogi prize money and game fee ranking ===
Moriuchi has finished in the "Top 10" of the JSA's year-end prize money and game fee rankings twenty-one times since 1993, and in the "Top 3" nine of those times.

Year	Amount	Rank
1993	¥22,970,000	5th
1996	¥33,980,000	3rd
1997	¥25,940,000	7th
1998	¥23,520,000	8th
1999	¥31,380,000	7th
2000	¥27,290,000	6th
2001	¥39,920,000	5th
2002	¥48,720,000	3rd
2003	¥52,690,000	3rd
2004	¥108,330,000	2nd
2005	¥71,170,000	2nd
2006	¥65,360,000	3rd
2007	¥67,210,000	4th
2008	¥37,820,000	4th
2009	¥27,280,000	6th
2010	¥32,700,000	2nd
2011	¥33,710,000	4th
2012	¥53,170,000	3rd
2013	¥55,030,000	3rd
2014	¥83,740,000	2nd
2015	¥34,500,000	4th

- Note: All amounts are given in Japanese yen and include prize money and fees earned from official tournaments and games held from January 1 to December 31.

== JSA director ==
Moriuchi was selected to be the senior managing director of the Japan Shogi Association's board of directors for a two-year term at the association's 68th General Meeting on May 29, 2017. In April 2019, he announced that he would not seek re-election when his term expired in June 2019.

== Other board games ==
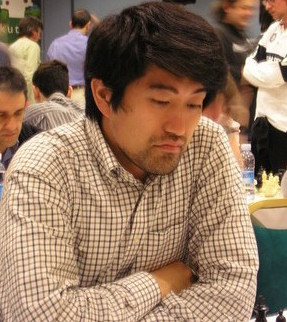
Moriuchi playing chess in 2005

Moriuchi also plays chess and backgammon. He has been playing in chess tournaments since 1998, and his chess Elo score is 2310 (FIDE Master level) as of January 2018.

In August 2014, he tied for fourth in the 39th Backgammon World Championship held in Monte Carlo.
