= Sōta Fujii =

Japanese shogi player (born 2002)

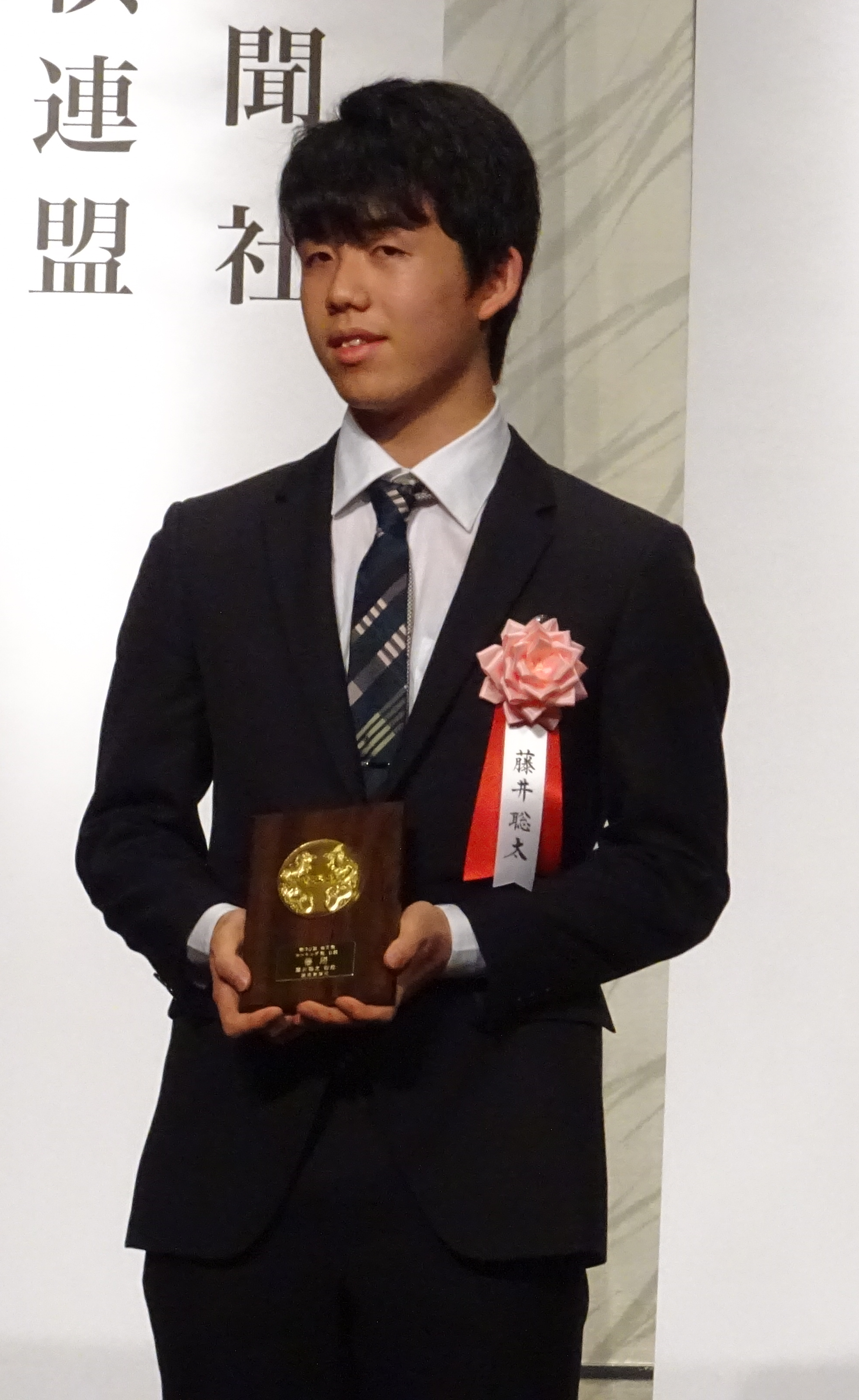
- Fujii in 2018
- Native name: 藤井聡太
- Born: July 19, 2002 (age 24)
- Hometown: Seto, Aichi

Career
- Achieved professional status: October 1, 2016 (aged 14)
- Badge number: 307
- Rank: 9-dan
- Teacher: Masataka Sugimoto (8-dan)
- Current titles held: Kiō; Kisei; Meijin; Ōi; Ōshō; Ryūō
- Lifetime titles: Lifetime Kisei, Lifetime Oi and Lifetime Ryūō
- Major titles won: 37
- Tournaments won: 14
- Meijin class: Meijin
- Ryūō class: Ryūō

Websites
- JSA profile page

Sōta Fujii (藤井 聡太, Fujii Sōta; born July 19, 2002 in Seto, Aichi) is a Japanese professional shogi player ranked 9-dan. He is the current holder of the Kiō, Kisei, Meijin, Ōi, Ōshō and Ryūō titles, and a former holder of the Eiō and Ōza titles. He is the youngest person (Note: The Japan Shogi Association (JSA) has separate systems for "regular" professionals (or Seiki Kishi) and women's professionals (or Joryū Kishi). No women has yet to qualify for "regular" professional status, but youngest female to be promoted to women's professional status is Aya Fujita who was promoted when she was 11 years 6 months of age, which makes her the youngest person (male or female) to be awarded any type of professional status by the JSA.) to be awarded professional status by the Japan Shogi Association and one of only five players to become professional while still a junior high school student.

Since becoming a professional, Fujii has broken a number of professional shogi records including being the youngest player to win a professional shogi tournament, the youngest player to challenge for a major title, the youngest player to win a major title, the youngest player to be a 2-crown title holder, the youngest player to defend a major title, the youngest player to be awarded the rank of 9-dan, the youngest to be a 3-crown title holder, the youngest to be a 4-crown title holder, the youngest to be a 5-crown title holder, the youngest to be a 6-crown title holder, the youngest to be a 7-crown title holder, the youngest to win the Meijin title, the youngest to win the Ōza title and becoming the first 8-crown title holder in professional shogi history. He also won his first 29 games as a professional to set a new record for most consecutive games won, and is also the first player to win all current non-title tournaments open to all professional shogi players in a single shogi year.

In July 2024, Fujii at age 21 years and 11 months became the youngest player to satisfy the criteria for becoming a "Lifetime Title Holder" when he qualified for the Lifetime Kisei title. The following month, he also qualified for the Lifetime Ōi title. In November 2025, he qualified for the Lifetime Ryūō title.

In 2025, Fujii became the first player to earn more than JPY 200 million in a single year.

== Early life and amateur shogi ==
Fujii was born in Seto, Aichi on July 19, 2002. His mother was a homemaker and his father was a company employee. He learned shogi at age five after being given a shogi set by his grandmother and started out playing games with his grandfather. Eventually he became too strong for his grandfather, so he started taking formal lessons at a neighborhood shogi school. As an elementary school student first-grade student, he began playing games against junior high school and senior high school students to test his skill.

Fujii's intense focus surprised his mother and his competitive spirit often led to crying outbursts when he lost. As a second-grade student, he got the opportunity to play a game against shogi professional Kōji Tanigawa as part of a simultaneous exhibition at a shogi event in Nagoya. Due to time limitations, Tanigawa offered Fujii a draw even though Fujii had a losing position. Upset by the offer, Fujii flipped the board and pieces, and then began crying until his mother came to take him away from the board.

Fujii was seven years old when he met his future professional shogi mentor Masataka Sugimoto for the first time. Sugimoto was amazed by the "marvelous perspective" and "insight" Fujii showed at such a young age and says that he is "the personification of fighting spirit" who "takes the frustration of defeat and directs it at the next match".

== Shogi apprentice professional ==
Fujii officially entered the shogi professional apprentice school as a 10-year-old under the sponsorship of Sugimoto with the rank of 6-kyū in September 2012. He became the youngest person ever to be promoted to 3-dan in October 2015 at the age of 13 years 2 months. Fujii competed in the "59th 3-dan league" with other 3-dan ranked apprentices from April to September 2017 and finished in first place with a 13–5 record to win promotion to the rank of professional 4-dan. He was only the eighth 3-dan player since 1987 to be promoted to professional status after only one season in the "3-dan league". Fujii's promotion to full professional status by the JSA became official on October 1, 2017.

== Shogi professional ==
=== Notable results ===
==== 2016–2017: Record breaking debut and early success ====
Fujii's debut game as a professional was on December 24, 2016, and he defeated 76-year-old Hifumi Katō. Katō was at the time the oldest active shogi professional, and the age gap of 62 years and 6 months between the two players broke the previous record of 58 years and 7 months set in 1986 when 15-year-old Yoshiharu Habu played 74-year-old Seiichi Kobori.

On April 4, 2017, Fujii defeated Hiroshi Kobayashi to win his 11th straight game since turning professional and break the previous record of 10 jointly held by Yoshiyuki Matsumoto and Masakazu Kondō.

Fujii won his 13th game in a row when he defeated Shōta Chida in the round one of the 67th NHK TV Shogi Tournament on April 17, 2017. The game result was posted the same day on the Japan Shogi Association's official website, even though the game was not broadcast on NHK-E until May 14, 2017. This is something which was highly unusual because NHK tournament games are pre-recorded, and game results are not made public until the game is actually broadcast.

Fujii became the fastest professional to reach 50 wins in official games on November 21, 2017, when he defeated Shingo Hirafuji. Fujii achieved his 50th win in his 56th official game in just ten months and twenty-nine days since his professional debut, surpassing the previous record held by Habu, who won his 50th game in his 66th game and took one year and two months.

===== 29-game winning streak =====
After defeating Katō to win his debut game, Fujii proceeded to win his next 28 official games before losing to Yūki Sasaki on July 2, 2017. His 29 consecutive wins broke the previous record of 28 set by Hiroshi Kamiya in 1987.

====== Opponents ======
Game	Date	Opponent	Note
1	December 24, 2016	Hifumi Katō 9d	30th Ryūō tournament (group 6). Defeats 76-year-old Katō in his debut game as a professional.
2	January 26, 2017	Takahiro Toyokawa 7d	Kiō tournament (preliminary round)
3	February 9, 2017	Masahiko Urano 8d	30th Ryūō tournament (group 6)
4	February 23, 2017	Masahiko Urano 8d	67th NHK TV Shogi Tournament (preliminary round)
5	February 23, 2017	Kensuke Kitahama 8d	67th NHK TV Shogi Tournament (preliminary round)
6	February 23, 2017	Yūgo Takeuchi 4d	67th NHK TV Shogi Tournament (preliminary round)
7	March 1, 2017	Kōzō Arimori 7d	Ōshō tournament (preliminary round)
8	March 10, 2017	Takahiro Ōhashi 4d	48th Shinjin-Ō tournament
9	March 16, 2017	Kazuharu Shoshi 7d	30th Ryūō tournament (group 6)
10	March 23, 2017	Takahiro Ōhashi 4d	Kiō tournament (preliminary round)
11	April 4, 2017	Hiroshi Kobayashi 7d	Ōshō tournament (preliminary round). Wins 11th straight game to set a new record for most consecutive wins since turning professional.
12	April 13, 2017	Yoshitaka Hoshino 4d	30th Ryūō tournament (group 6)
13	April 17, 2017	Shōta Chida 6d	67th NHK TV Shogi Tournament (round 1)
14	April 26, 2017	Shingo Hirafuji 7d	Kiō tournament (preliminary round)
15	May 1, 2017	Kōta Kanai 6d	30th Ryūō tournament (group 6)
16	May 4, 2017	Daiki Yokoyama (amateur)	48th Shinjin-Ō tournament
17	May 12, 2017	Kazuhiro Nishikawa 6d	Ōshō tournament (preliminary round)
18	May 18, 2017	Yugo Takeuchi 4d	Kakogawa Seiryū
19	May 25, 2017	Seiya Kondō 5d	30th Ryūō tournament (group 6: championship game)
20	June 2, 2017	Shingo Sawada 6d	Kiō tournament (preliminary round: championship game)
21	June 7, 2017	Ryuuma Tonari 4d	Jōshū Yamada Cup
22	June 7, 2017	Satoru Sakaguchi 5d	Jōshū Yamada Cup
23	June 7, 2017	Hiroshi Miyamoto 5d	Jōshū Yamada Cup. Wins 23rd consecutive game to move into third-place for most consecutive victories in a row.
24	June 10, 2017	Hirotaka Kajiura 4d	Eiō (preliminary round)
25	June 10, 2017	Ryuuma Tonari 4d	Eiō tournament (preliminary round). Defeats Tonari for the second time in three days to move into sole second place for most consecutive wins in a row.
26	June 15, 2017	Shōji Segawa 5d	Meijin tournament (class C2)
27	June 17, 2017	Hayata Fujioka (amateur)	Asahi Cup Open
28	June 21, 2017	Shingo Sawada 6d	Ōshō tournament (preliminary round). Defeats Sawada to tie Kamiya's record.
29	June 26, 2017	Yasuhiro Masuda 4d	Defeats Masuda to set new record.

====== Impact ======
Fujii's winning streak was widely covered by Japanese and overseas media outlets. His promotion to professional status and his subsequent success was viewed as helping the Japan Shogi Association recover from the scandal of the 29th Ryūō challenger controversy; a scandal which had ultimately led to the resignation of the JSA's president in January 2017, the removal of several directors in February 2017, and a general loss of public confidence.

Fujii's streak not only helped the JSA recover from the aforementioned scandal, but also provided an economic boost as well. The streak led to increased sales of shogi books, and other merchandise, etc. as well as a general increase in shogi's popularity nationwide, particularly among young children. Local merchants in Fujii's hometown of Seto held commemorative sales to honor him for the streak and for his 15th birthday, and it was estimated almost 7.4 million people watched the live webcast of Fujii's record-setting victory. Sensu (folding hand fans) signed by Fujii were sold by the JSA in both Tokyo and Osaka in an unusual move since such a thing is typically only reserved for major title holders; the fans, however, quickly sold out at both locations in less than an hour despite there being a limit set at one fan per person, with people lining up in advance to receive a numbered ticket to purchase a fan. Some of the fans sold subsequently showed up on online auction websites where bids up to JPY 15,600 were observed despite the original sale price of about JPY 2,300.

In December 2017, the JSA estimated that the over all impact of Fujii's streak on its advertizing revenue had been roughly 18.5 billion yen. Fujii's first official game against a reigning major title holder came on January 14, 2018, when he defeated Meijin Amahiko Satō in the quarterfinals of the 11th Asahi Cup Open.

==== 2018–2019: Meijin ranking league success and multiple tournament victories ====
On February 1, 2018, Fujii defeated Hirotaka Kajiura in a Meijin Class C2 game to improve his league record to 9 wins and 0 losses and ensure his promotion to Meijin Class C1 in April 2018. Fujii's promotion to Class C1 also meant his promotion to the rank of 5-dan, thus making him the first junior high school student to ever be awarded the rank.

Fujii became the youngest player to win a professional shogi tournament on February 17, 2018, when he defeated Akihito Hirose in the final of the 11th Asahi Cup Open. Fujii advanced to the final by defeating the reigning Ryūō and Kisei title holder Yoshiharu Habu in the semi-finals held earlier that same day. Fujii's victory at age 15 years and 6 months broke the previous record of 15 years and 10 months set by Hifumi Katō in 1955. Fujii's victory also meant automatic promotion to the rank of 6-dan, thus making him the youngest player to ever be awarded such a rank by breaking the previous record (also held by Katō) of 16 years and 3 months.

On March 15, 2018, Fujii defeated Tatsuya Sanmaidō to finish Class 2 play undefeated at 10 wins and 0 losses. Fujii became the first player in six years to finish Class 2 play undefeated. The victory was Fujii's 15th in a row, which made him the holder of the two longest consecutive winning streaks for the 2017 shogi season. Fujii's victory was also his 60th victory overall in a single year which made him not only the 4th player ever to reach 60 wins, but also the youngest player ever to do so. (Note: The other three players are Yoshiharu Habu (four times), Toshiyuki Moriuchi (once) and Kazuki Kimura (once).)

On March 28, 2018, Fujii played his final game as a junior high school student and of the 2017 shogi season when he faced Keita Inoue in a third round preliminary round game for the 68th Ōshō Tournament. The game was broadcast live by the Igo & Shogi Channel as part of its "Shogi Premium" service. Inoue won the game in 137 moves, thus becoming the first player aged 50 or older to defeat Fujii in an official game. Inoue's victory also stopped Fujii's 16 game winning streak. Fujii's winning streak began after a loss to on Takahiro Ōhashi on January 6, 2018, and included wins over the reigning Meijin title holder Satō, the reigning Ryūō title holder Habu, former Ōshō title holder Hirose, former Ryūō title holder Tetsurō Itodani as well as his first official game against his mentor Sugimoto.

Fujii became the youngest player to be promoted to 7-dan when he defeated Kōhei Funae on May 18, 2018. Fujii's win in the championship game for Ryūō Class 5 meant that he achieved Ryōū ranking class promotion for two consecutive years, thus satisfying the promotion criteria for 7-dan. Fujii's record of reaching 7-dan at age 15 years 9 months broke the previous record of 17 years 3 months set by Hifumi Katō in 1957.

In October 2018, Fujii won his second shogi championship when he defeated apprentice professional Wakamu Deguchi 3-dan 2 games to 0 to win the 49th Shinjin-Ō tournament. Fujii's victory made him the youngest player ever to win the tournament at 16 years and 2 months, breaking the 31-year-old record of 17 years and 0 months set by Toshiyuki Moriuchi in 1987.

Fujii at age 16 became the youngest player to win 100 official games as a professional on December 12, 2018. Fujii's victory also made him the fastest (two years and two months since turning professional) to achieve such a result, and his winning percentage of .847 (100 wins and 18 losses) is also the highest of any player to have previously won 100 games.

On January 8, 2019, Fujii defeated Eisaku Tomioka in Mejin Class C1 league play. The win was Fujii's 18 consecutive win in Meijin League play since debuting as a shogi professional which tied the record set by Makoto Nakahara 52 years earlier. Fujii, however, was defeated by Seiya Kondō in his next league game on February 5, 2019, to end the winning streak.

In February 2019, Fujii successfully defended his Asahi Cup championship when he defeated Kiō title holder Akira Watanabe to win the 12th Asahi Cup Open tournament.

==== 2020–2022: Multiple major title victories ====
In March 2020, Fujii became the first shogi professional to achieve a .800 winning percentage or greater for three consecutive years when he defeated Akira Inaba in challenger league play for the 61st Ōi tournament. (Note: Yoshiharu Habu and Makoto Nakahara won 80% or more of their games three times in their careers, but neither achieved such a result for more than two-years in a row.)

Fujii defeated Takuya Nagase on June 4, 2020, to earn the right to challenge Watanabe for the 91st Kisei title. Fujii's victory not only allowed him to become the challenger for a major title for the first time, it also made him the youngest person ever (at the age 17 years, 10 months and 20 days) to challenge for a major title, breaking the record set 31 years earlier by Nobuyuki Yashiki by four days. In title match against Watanabe, Fujii won the first two games before losing Game 3. He then won Game 4 to win the match 3 games to 1 and become—at the age of 17 years and 11 months—the youngest major title holder in professional shogi history.

On August 20, 2020, Fujii won the Ōi title from Kazuki Kimura. Fujii defeated Kimura 4 games to 0 to win the 61st Ōi title. Fujii's victory made him the youngest person to become a 2-crown title holder and also the youngest person to be promoted to the rank of 8-dan. (Note: Fujii's promotion to 8-dan at age 18 years 1 month broke the previous record of 18 years 3 months held by Hifumi Katō. His becoming a 2-crown broke the previous record of 21 years 11 months held by Yoshiharu Habu.)

In October 2020. Fujii defeated Itodani to win the 28th Ginga-sen. His victory at the age of 18 years and 2 months made him the youngest to ever win the tournament, breaking the record of 21 years and 4 months set in 2005 by Watanabe. The game was played on October 15, 2020, but the result was not made public until the game was broadcast on December 12, 2020.

In February 2021, Fujii won the Asahi Cup Open tournament for the third time by defeating Hiroyuki Miura in the finals of the 14th Asahi Cup Open.

On July 3, 2021, Fujii successfully defended the Kisei title in the 92nd Kisei Tournament, defeating Watanabe 3 games to 0. His successful title defense made him the youngest player to successfully defend a major title, (Note: The previous record of 19 years and 0 months was set in 1991 by Nobuyuki Yashiki.) and also meant that he satisfied the promotion criteria for the rank of 9-dan. Fujii's promotion to 9-dan at age 18 years and 11 months made him the youngest player to ever be promoted to 9-dan. (Note: The previous record of 21 years and 7 months was set in 2005 by Akira Watanabe.)

Fujii successively defended his Ōi title in June–August 2021 by defeating challenger Masayuki Toyoshima 4 games to 1 to win the 62nd Ōi title match. Fujii actually lost Game 1 of the match before winning the next four games to retain his crown. In July–September 2021, Fujii challenged Toyoshima for the latter's Eiō title, with Fujii coming out on top again to win the 6th Eiō title match 3 games to 2. Winning the Eiō title made Fujii the youngest 3-crown title holder in history at 19 years and 1 month which broke the previous record of 22 years and 3 months set by Habu in 1993. Fuiji and Toyoshima met in a major title match for a third time in 2021 when Fujii challenged Toyoshima for the Ryūō title in 34th Ryūō title match held in October–November 2021. Fujii won the match 4 games to none to become the youngest 4-crown title holder. (Note: Fujii was 19 years and 3 months old when he won his 4th crown. The previous record of 22 years and 9 months was set in 1993 by Yoshiharu Habu.)

In February 2022, Fujii defeated Watanabe 4 games to 0 to win the 71st Ōshō title (January–February 2022). The victory made Fujii not only the fourth player to become a 5-crown title holder, (Note: The other three are Yasuharu Ōyama, Makoto Nakahara and Yoshiharu Habu.) but also the youngest to achieve such a feat. (Note: Fujii's age of 19 years and 6 months broke the previous record of 22 years and 10 months set by Yoshiharu Habu in August 1993.)

Fujii successfully defended his Eiō title by defeating Wakamu Deguchi 3 games to 0 to win the 7th Eiō title match (April–May 2022). In June–July 2022, Fujii defeated Nagase 3 games to 1 to successfully defend his Kisei title. In June–September 2022, Fujii defeated Toyoshima 4 games to 1 in the 63rd Ōi title match to successfully defend his Ōi title and become youngest player to have won ten major titles. In October–December 2022, Fujii defeated Akihito Hirose 4 games to 2 to successfully defend his Ryūō title.

On November 20, 2022, Fujii won the JT Nihon Series tournament for the first time when he defeated Shintarō Saitō to win the 43rd JT Cup.

Fujii won the televised Ginga tournament for the second time when he defeated Taichi Takami to win the 30th Ginga Tournament on December 27, 2022. (Note: The actual game was played on October 31, 2022, but the result was not made public until the game was broadcast in December.)

==== 2023–2026: Continued dominance and becoming the first 8-crown title holder ====
On February 23, 2023, he won the 16th Asahi Cup Open by defeating Toyoshima and Watanabe, in the semi-finals and finals respectively. It was the fourth time Fujii won the tournament.

On March 12, 2023, Fujii defeated challenger Habu in Game 6 of the 72nd Ōshō title match (January–March 2023) 4 games to 2. This was the first time the two met in a major title match. The match was tied at two wins apiece after four games, but Fujii won the next two games to defend his Ōshō title.

On March 19, 2023, Fujii defeated Watanabe in Game 4 of the 48th Kiō title match (February–March 2023) to win the match 3 games to 1. This made Fujii not only the second but also the youngest player to become a 6-crown title holder at age 20 years 8 months. (Note: Fujii broke the record of 24 years and 2 months set by Yoshiharu Habu in 1994.) On the same day, the final of the 72nd NHK Cup was broadcast (Note: NHK tournament games are recorded for broadcast on a later date, and game results are not made public until a game has been broadcast.) and Fujii defeated Yuki Sasaki 8-dan to win the tournament for the first time. The win also made Fujii the first professional shogi player in history to win all non-major title tournaments in a single season. A few months later in May, Fujii successfully defended his Eiō title by defeating Tatsuya Sugai 3 games to 1 in the 8th Eiō title match. A few days after defending his Eiō title, Fujii defeated Watanabe in Game 5 of the 81st Meijin title match to win the match 4 games to 1 and become the youngest person to win the Meijin title. Fujii's win made him only the second person to become a 7-crown title older and also the youngest to do so. Fujii's undefeated streak in major title matches continued in June–August 2023 when he first defeated Daichi Sasaki 3 games to 1 in the 94th Kisei title match (June–July 2023) to defend his Kisei title, and then beat Sasaki again 4 games to 1 in the 64th Ōi title match (July–August 2023) to defend his Ōi title.

On October 11, 2023, Fujii defeated Nagase to win the 71st Ōza title match 3 games to 1 and become the first 8-crown title holder in the history of professional shogi. Fujii's victory also gave made him the youngest person at 21 years and 2 month to win the Oza title.

In his first title defense since becoming an 8-crown title holder, Fujii defeated Takumi Itō 4 games to none in the 36th Ryūō title match to win the Ryuo title for the third consecutive year. This was also the first time that Fujii had faced an opponent of the same age in a major title match. A little over a week later, Fujii defeated Itodani 8-dan in the final round of the 44th JT Nihon Series tournament (44th JT Cup) to win the tournament for the second consecutive year.

Fujii's attempt to repeat his "shogi grand slam" and win all non-major title shogi tournaments for the second consecutive year ended in December 2023 (Note: The championship game was actually played on November 1, 2023, but the final result was not made public until the game was broadcast on December 23, 2023.) when he lost to Tadahisa Maruyama in the finals of the 31st Ginga-sen quick play tournament. Fujii suffered more set backs in February 2024 when he lost to Nagase in the championship game of the 17th Asahi Cup Open, and in March 2024 when he lost to Sasaki in the finals of the 73rd NHK Cup tournament.

In major title defenses, however, Fujii continued to exert his dominance by defending his Ōshō and Kiō titles. He defeated Sugai 4 games to 0 in the 73rd Ōshō title match (January–February 2024), and Itō in 48th Kiō title match (February–March 2024). Fujii's victory over Sugai was his twentieth consecutive major title victory which broke the record of nineteen set 58 years earlier in 1966 by Yasuharu Ōyama, while his victory of Itō gave him a winning percentage of 0.851 for the 2023–2024 shogi season which is the second highest of all time behind the 0.854 of Makoto Nakahara set in 1967. Fujii extended his major title match winning streak to 22 matches in a row when he defeated challenger Toyoshima 4 games to 1 to win the 82nd Meijin Title Match (April–June 2024) and defend his Meijin title. His streak and his hold on all eight major titles came to end, however, after losing the 9th Eiō title match (April–June 2024) to Itō 3 games to 2. In July 2024, however, Fujii returned to his winning ways by defeating Takayuki Yamasaki 3 games to 0 in the 95th Kisei Title Match (June–July 2024) and win the Kisei title for fifth consecutive year. The victory also made Fujii the youngest player at age 21 years and 11 months to meet the criteria for becoming a "Lifetime Title Holder" when he qualified for the Lifetime Kisei title. (Note: The previous record of 23 years and 11 months was set by Makoto Nakahara in 1971.) In July–August 2024, Fujii defended his Ōi by defeating Watanabe 4 games to 1 to win the 65th Ōi title match. The victory qualified Fujii for the Lifetime Ōi title. The following month, Fujii defeated Nagase 3 games to none in the 72nd Ōza title match (September 2024) in his first defense of the Oza title he captured from Nagase the previous year. In December 2024, Fujii successfully defended his Ryūō title and 7-crown status by defeating Sasaki 4 games to 2 in the 37th Ryūō Title Match (October–December 2024).

In the 50th Kiō title match (February–March 2025), Fujii successfully defended his Kiō title holder by defeating Yasuhiro Masuda 3 games to none. The title was Fujii's 27th overall, which moved him into a tie for 5th place on the all-time major title holder's list with Kōji Tanigawa. Fujii passed Tanigawa about a week later when he won his 28th major title by defeating Nagase in the 74th Ōshō title match (January–March 2025) 4 games to 1. On March 16, 2025, Fujii defeated Masataka Goda in the finals of the 74th NHK Cup tournament to win the tournament for the second time. Fujii and Nagase met once again in 83rd Meijin title match (April–May 2025), with Fujii defending his Meijin crown by a score of 4 games to 1. The following month, Fujii maintained his 7-crown status and won the Kisei title match for the sixth consecutive year by defeating challenger Kazuo Sugimoto 3 games to none in the 96th Kisei Title Match (June 2025). In the 66th Ōi title match against Nagase (July–September 2025), Fujii successfully defended his Ōi title by winning the match 4 games to 2. It was his 6th consecutive Ōi title and his 31st major title overall. Fujii, however, was unable to defend his Ōza title and fell to 6-crown status after losing the 73rd Ōza title match (September–October 2025) to Itō 3 games to 2.

Fujii qualified for the Lifetime Ryūō title in November 2025 when he defeated Sasaki 4 games to none in the 38th Ryūō Title Match (October–November 2025) to win the title for the fifth consecutive year. Fujii is the third person after Watanabe and Habu to qualify for the Lifetime Ryūō title and the youngest at 23 years old to do so. He also finished runner up in the Ginga tournament for the third consecutive year after losing to Toyoshima in the final of the 33rd Ginga Tournament. The actual game was played on October 24, 2025, but was recorded for later broadcast on the Igo & Shogi Channel; so, the final result was not made public until December 30, 2025.

Fujii's challenger for the Ōshō tille for the second year in a row was Nagase. Fujii was one loss away from losing the 75th Ōshō Title Match (January–March 2025) after a Game 4 defeat but came back to win the next three games to win the title for the fifth consecutive year and also defend his 6-crown status. Like in the case of the 75th Ōshō Title Match, Fujii faced the same challenger, Masuda, for the second year in a row in the 51st Kiō Title Match (February–March 2026) and was also one loss away from losing his title before coming back to win the match 3 games to 2.

In February 2026, Fujii defeated Itō to win the 19th Asahi Cup. It was the fifth time Fujii won the tournament, which tied him with Habu for most times over all. The following month (March 2026), Fujii defeated Yashuhiro Masuda to win the NHK Cup for the second year in a row and the third time overall. Later in 2026, he successfully defended his Meijin Title and maintained his 6-crown status by defeating challenger Itodani 4 games to none in the 84th Meijin Title Match (April – May 2026). Fujii's next major title defense came against Shin'ichirō Hattori in the 97th Kisei Match (June–July 2026); Fujii won the match 3 games to none, which not only allowed him to maintain his 6-crown status but also gave him his seventh Kisei Title in seven tries. Fujii repeated this feat when he defeated Itō 4 games to 2 to win the 67th Ōi title match (July–September 2026) to win his seventh Ōi title in seven tries.

=== Promotion history ===
The promotion history of Fujii is as follows:

- 6-kyū: September 2012
- 3-dan: April 2016
- 4-dan: October 1, 2016
- 5-dan: February 1, 2018
- 6-dan: February 17, 2018
- 7-dan: May 18, 2018
- 8-dan: August 20, 2020
- 9-dan: July 3, 2021

=== Titles and other championships ===
Fujii has appeared in 39 major title matches and has won 37 major titles. He has also won fourteen shogi non-title tournaments.

==== Major titles ====
Tournament	Years	Number of times
Eiō	2020–2022	3
Kiō	2022–2025 (current)	4
Kisei	2020–2026 (current)	7
Meijin	2023–2026 (current)	4
Ōi	2020–2026 (current)	7
Ōshō	2021–2025 (current)	5
Ōza	2023–2024	2
Ryūō	2021–2025 (current)	5

==== Other championships ====
Tournament	Years	Number of times
Asahi Cup Open	2017–2018, 2020, 2022, 2025 (current)	5
Shinjin-Ō	2018	1
Ginga-sen	2020, 2022	2
JT Nihon Series	2022-2023, 2025 (current)	3
NHK Cup	2022, 2024–2025 (current)	3

=== Awards and honors ===
On March 13, 2018, the JSA announced that Fujii had been confirmed to be the winner of its Annual Shogi Awards for "Most Games Won", "Best Winning Percentage", "Most Game Played" and "Most Consecutive Games Won" for his results during the 2017 professional shogi season (April 1, 2017 – March 31, 2018). Fujii is the youngest player to win those four major awards in the same year and only the third shogi professional to accomplish the feat since 1967. (Note: These four awards are based upon player records in official games. Yoshiharu Habu accomplished the same feat four times (1989, 1990, 1993 and 2001) and Kunio Naitō did it once in 1969, under the previous system followed by the JSA.) On April 2, 2018, the JSA announced that Fujii had been awarded the "Best New Player"、the "Special Award" and the "Game of the Year Special Prize" awards as well.

In February 2018, Fujii received a special commendation from Aichi Prefecture for his victory in the 11th Aichi Cup Open and his other shogi accomplishments. Fujii is the youngest ever and only the sixth individual to have received said commendation. (Note: Previous recipients were Morimichi Takagi, Midori Ito, Eiko Shishii, Ichiro Suzuki, Kinsan Ginsan and the Chunichi Dragons,) Fujii was awarded the Seto City's "Distinguished Citizen Award" in March 2018.

==== Annual Shogi Awards ====
- 45th Annual Shogi Awards (April 2017 – March 2018): Best New Player, Special Award, Best Winning Percentage, Most Games Won, Most Games Played, Most Consecutive Games Won, and Game of the Year Special Prize
- 46th Annual Shogi Awards (April 2018 – March 2019): Kōzō Masuda Award
- 47th Annual Shogi Awards (April 2019 – March 2020): Most Games Won, Best Winning Percentage and Game of the Year Special Prize
- 48th Annual Shogi Awards (April 2020 – March 2021): Player of the Year, Best Winning Percentage, Most Games Won, Game of the Year, Game of the Year Special Prize and Masuda Special Prize
- 49th Annual Shogi Awards (April 2021 – March 2022): Player of the Year, Most Games Won, Most Games Played and Game of the Year
- 50th Annual Shogi Awards (April 2022 – March 2023): Player of the Year, Best Winning Percentage, Most Games Won, Game of the Year and Game of the Year Special Prize
- 51st Annual Shogi Awards (April 2023 – March 2024): Player of the Year, Best Winning Percentage, Game of the Year and Game of the Year Special Prize
- 52nd Annual Shogi Awards (April 2024 – March 2025): Player of the Year, Game of the Year and Game of the Year Special Prize

==== Other awards ====
- 2018: Seto City "Distinguished Citizen Award", Aichi Prefecture "Special Commendation"

=== Year-end prize money and game fee ranking ===
Fujii has finished in the "Top 10" of the JSA's year-end prize money and game fee rankings seven times since turning professional: ninth place with JPY 21,080,000 in earnings for 2019; fourth place with JPY 45,540,000 in earnings in 2020; third place with JPY 69,960,000 in earnings in 2021; first place with JPY 122,050,000 in earnings in 2022; first place with JPY 186,340,000 in earnings in 2023; first place with JPY 175,560,000 in earnings in 2024; and first place with JPY 213,610,000 in earnings in 2025.

In 2025, he became the first professional shogi player to earn more than JPY 200,000,000 in a single year.

== Tsume Shogi Solving Competition ==
In March 2019, Fujii won the 15th Tsume Shogi Solving Competition, thus becoming the only person to win the competition four years in a row. Fujii was the only participant, which included both amateur and professional shogi players, to finish with a perfect score of 100 points. Fujii first won the competition in 2015 as a 12-year-old apprentice shogi professional 2-dan, and was the only participant to finish with a perfect score to become the youngest winner in the competition's history.

Fujii repeated as champion the following year when he won the 16th Tsume Shogi Competition, but the competition was cancelled from 2020 to 2023 due to the COVID-19 pandemic. The competition resumed in 2024, but Fujii did not participate.

== Abema TV appearances ==
Fujii has been featured in several programs broadcast on the JSA's shogi channel of the Internet television station AbemaTV.

In March – April 2017, Fujii was featured in Sōta Fujii 4d The Blazing 7-game Match: New Generation Story in which he played seven games against top professionals selected by the JSA. The games were unofficial, which meant the results did not affect his official win–loss record, and his opponents were (in order) Yasuhiro Masuda, Takuya Nagase, Shintarō Saitō, Taichi Nakamura, Kōichi Fukaura, Yasumitsu Satō and Yoshiharu Habu. Fujii won all of the games except Game 2 against Nagase.

== Video game ==
On March 3, 2020, Game Studio released a video game for the Nintendo Switch in Japan endorsed by Fujii and the JSA called 棋士･藤井聡太の将棋トレーニング (Kishi･Fujii Sōta no Shōgi Torēningu, Shogi Professional Sōta Fujii's Shogi Training).

== Personal life ==
In October 2017, Fujii announced that it was his intention to enter senior high school after graduating from junior high school in the spring of 2018. Fujii said that he gave becoming a full-time shogi professional serious consideration but stated "I'd like to continue to progress and make every experience a positive one." Fujii's decision was widely anticipated in Japan and was viewed favorably by fellow shogi professionals and some education critics. Fujii's decision to continue his education is the same one made by the other four shogi professionals who obtained professional status while still a junior high school.

On March 20, 2018, Fujii graduated from Nagoya University Affiliated Lower Secondary School located in Nagoya. He enrolled as a student at Nagoya University Affiliated Upper Secondary School in April 2018 but announced that he had left high school at the end of January 2021 to focus on shogi.
