= Ōza (shogi) =

Title in Japanese professional shogi

Ōza (王座) is one of the eight titles in Japanese professional shogi.

The word literally means "king's seat", i.e., "throne". The tournament started in 1953 as a knockout tournament with three games in the final match and was a non-title tournament up until 1982. The challenger for the title is determined through three preliminary rounds. The player that wins three games out of five in the championship match becomes the new Ōza title holder.

The tournament is sponsored by Nikkei, Inc. (日本経済新聞社 nihon keizai shinbunsha), a newspaper conglomerate that publishes The Nikkei and the Nikkei 225 stock market index. The current Ōza title holder is Takumi Itō.

== Lifetime Ōza ==
"Lifetime Ōza" (名誉王座) is the title given to a player who won the championship five times in a row or ten times in total. Active players may qualify for this title, but it is only officially awarded upon their reaching the age of 60 years, retirement or death.

Lifetime Ōza title holders

- Makoto Nakahara (won championship ten times when it was a non-title tournament)
- Yoshiharu Habu

== Winners ==
From 1953 until 1982, the tournament was just regular tournament and not a major title match. From 1953 to 1969, two finalists would play a 3-game match to determine the overall winner; the 1st Oza match (1953), however, was only a single game. From 1970 to 1982, the winner of the previous year's tournament would play the winner of a qualifying tournament in a 3-game match.

No.	Year	Winner	Score	Opponent
1	1953	Yasuharu Ōyama	1–0	Yūzō Maruta
2	1954	Yasuharu Ōyama	2–1	Kōzō Masuda
3	1955	Yasuharu Ōyama	2–1	Renshō Nada
4	1956	Seiichi Kobori	2–1	Kazukiyo Takashima
5	1957	Shigeyuki Matsuda	2–1	Seiichi Kobori
6	1958	Masao Tsukada	2–1	Tatsuya Futakami
7	1959	Yasuharu Ōyama	2–0	Michiyoshi Yamada
8	1960	Yūzō Maruta	2–1	Yasuharu Ōyama
9	1961	Sōetsu Honma	2–0	Hifumi Katō
10	1962	Hifumi Katō	2–0	Michihito Kumagai
11	1963	Renshō Nada	2–1	Hirobumi Sekizawa
12	1964	Yasuharu Ōyama	2–0	Hifumi Katō
13	1965	Yūzō Maruta	2–0	Kunio Naitō
14	1966	Yasuharu Ōyama	2–0	Yūzō Maruta
15	1967	Michiyoshi Yamada	2–0	Kunio Naitō
16	1968	Yasuharu Ōyama	2–0	Hifumi Katō
17	1969	Makoto Nakahara	2–1	Michio Ariyoshi
18	1970	Makoto Nakahara	2–0	Tatsuya Futakami
19	1971	Makoto Nakahara	2–0	Hifumi Katō
20	1972	Makoto Nakahara	2–0	Kunio Naitō
21	1973	Makoto Nakahara	2–0	Genichi Ōno
22	1974	Makoto Nakahara	2–1	Yasuharu Ōyama
23	1975	Kiyozumi Kiriyama	2–0	Makoto Nakahara
24	1976	Makoto Nakahara	2–0	Kiyozumi Kiriyama
25	1977	Makoto Nakahara	2–0	Nobuyuki Ōuchi
26	1978	Makoto Nakahara	2–0	Nobuyuki Ōuchi
27	1979	Makoto Nakahara	2–0	Nobuyuki Ōuchi
28	1980	Yasuharu Ōyama	2–0	Makoto Nakahara
29	1981	Yasuharu Ōyama	2–1	Osamu Katsuura
30	1982	Kunio Naitō	2–0	Yasuharu Ōyama

For the 31st Oza Match (1983), the tournament was officially elevated to major title match status and starting with the 32nd Oza Match, the format switched to a best-of-five.

No.	Year	Winner	Score	Opponent
31	1983	Makoto Nakahara	2–1	Kunio Naitō
32	1984	Makoto Nakahara (2)	3–2	Hidemitsu Moriyasu
33	1985	Makoto Nakahara (3)	3–1	Kōji Tanigawa
34	1986	Makoto Nakahara (4)	3–0	Kiyozumi Kiriyama
35	1987	Yasuaki Tsukada	3–2	Makoto Nakahara
36	1988	Makoto Nakahara (5)	3–0	Yasuaki Tsukada
37	1989	Makoto Nakahara (6)	3–2	Teruichi Aono
38	1990	Kōji Tanigawa	3–1	Makoto Nakahara
39	1991	Bungo Fukusaki	3–2	Kōji Tanigawa
40	1992	Yoshiharu Habu	3–0	Bungo Fukusaki
41	1993	Yoshiharu Habu (2)	3–1	Koji Tanigawa
42	1994	Yoshiharu Habu (3)	3–0	Kōji Tanigawa
43	1995	Yoshiharu Habu (4)	3–0	Keiji Mori
44	1996	Yoshiharu Habu (5)	3–0	Akira Shima
45	1997	Yoshiharu Habu (6)	3–0	Akira Shima
46	1998	Yoshiharu Habu (7)	3–2	Kōji Tanigawa
47	1999	Yoshiharu Habu (8)	3–1	Tadahisa Maruyama
48	2000	Yoshiharu Habu (9)	3–2	Takeshi Fujii
49	2001	Yoshiharu Habu (10)	3–1	Toshiaki Kubo
50	2002	Yoshiharu Habu (11)	3–0	Yasumitsu Satō
51	2003	Yoshiharu Habu (12)	3–2	Akira Watanabe
52	2004	Yoshiharu Habu (13)	3–1	Toshiyuki Moriuchi
53	2005	Yoshiharu Habu (14)	3–0	Yasumitsu Satō
54	2006	Yoshiharu Habu (15)	3–0	Yasumitsu Satō
55	2007	Yoshiharu Habu (16)	3–0	Toshiaki Kubo
56	2008	Yoshiharu Habu (17)	3–0	Kazuki Kimura
57	2009	Yoshiharu Habu (18)	3–0	Takayuki Yamasaki
58	2010	Yoshiharu Habu (19)	3–0	Takeshi Fujii
59	2011	Akira Watanabe	3–0	Yoshiharu Habu
60	2012	Yoshiharu Habu (20)	3–1	Akira Watanabe
61	2013	Yoshiharu Habu (21)	3–2	Taichi Nakamura
62	2014	Yoshiharu Habu (22)	3–2	Masayuki Toyoshima
63	2015	Yoshiharu Habu (23)	3–2	Amahiko Satō
64	2016	Yoshiharu Habu (24)	3–0	Tetsuro Itodani
65	2017	Taichi Nakamura	3–1	Yoshiharu Habu
66	2018	Shintarō Saitō	3–2	Taichi Nakamura
67	2019	Takuya Nagase	3–0	Shintarō Saitō
68	2020	Takuya Nagase (2)	3–2	Toshiaki Kubo
69	2021	Takuya Nagase (3)	3–1	Kazuki Kimura
70	2022	Takuya Nagase (4)	3–1	Masayuki Toyoshima
71	2023	Sōta Fujii	3–1	Takuya Nagase
72	2024	Sōta Fujii (2)	3–0	Takuya Nagase
73	2025	Takumi Itō	3–2	Sōta Fujii
74	2026	Akihito Hirose	3–2	Takumi Itō

== Records ==
- Most titles overall: Yoshiharu Habu, 24
- Most consecutive titles: Yoshiharu Habu, 19 in a row (1992–2010)

== See also ==
- Oza (Go)
