= Eiō =

Shogi tournament

- Native name: 叡王戦
- Type: Title
- Sponsor(s): Fujiya
- Winner's title: Eiō
- Reigning champion: Takumi Itō
- Number of times held: 10
- First held: Non-title (2015); Title (2017)
- Last held: 2024
- Most times won: Sōta Fujii (3)
- Most consecutive wins: Sōta Fujii (3)

Website(s)
- JSA tournament website (in Japanese)
- Sponsor's tournament website (in Japanese)

The Eiō (叡王) is one of the eight major titles of professional shogi cosponsored by Fujiya Co. and the Japan Shogi Association (JSA). The tournament initially started out as a non-title tournament in 2015, but was upgraded to major title status in May 2017. The current Eiō title holder is Takumi Itō.

== Format ==
The tournament is open to all active professional shogi players, one women's professional shogi player and one amateur shogi player. It is divided into four parts: women professional and amateur participation determination tournaments, a preliminary tournament, a main tournament and a title match.

=== Women professionals and amateur participants ===
Separate one-day single-elimination tournaments are held prior to the beginning of the preliminary tournament to determine the woman and amateur participants. Four participants are selected by the sponsors for each tournament: the women's tournament participants are selected from the reigning women professional major title holders and the amateur tournament participants are selected from the reigning major amateur shogi title holders. Each tournament has two rounds with a primary time control of one hour per player using a chess clock system followed by a secondary byo-yomi time control of sixty seconds per move. The tournament pairings are determined by drawing lots, with one of the first-round games played in the morning and the other played in the afternoon. The two winners then play each other in the evening to determine which player will advance to the preliminary tournament.

=== Preliminary tournament ===
The preliminary tournament is single-elimination tournament divided into different blocks according to player rank, with all players ranked the same competing against each other; the women's professional and amateur player are placed in the block for player's ranked 4-dan. Each block follows a bracket tournament format with a total of sixteen players advancing to the main tournament. The number of brackets per block varies with the winner of each bracket advancing to the main tournament as follows: four players from the 9-dan block; three players each from the 8-dan, 7-dan and 6-dan blocks; two players from the 5-dan block; and one player from the 4-dan block. The primary time control for the preliminary tournament games is one hour per player using a chess clock system followed by a secondary byo-yomi time control of sixty seconds per move. The preliminary tournament games are typically played between mid-June and the end of October.

=== Main tournament ===
The main tournament is a single elimination tournament which consists of the sixteen players advancing from the preliminary tournament plus an additional eight players seeded into the main tournament for a total of twenty-four players. The seeded players are determined among the following: (1) the four semifinalists from the previous year's tournament; (2) major title holders (excluding the reigning Eiō title holder); (3) winners of major non-title shogi tournaments; and (4) players who performed exceptionally well in the previous years tournament per consultation with the tournament sponsors. The main tournament pairings are determined by drawing lots and players who win their games advance up through the bracket. The remaining two players from each half of the bracket advance to a best-of-three challenger match, and the winner advances to main title match. The primary time control for the main tournament and challenger match games is three hours per player using a chess clock system followed by a secondary byo-yomi time control of sixty seconds per move. The main tournament games are played between November and January, with the challenger match taking place in February.

=== Title match ===
==== Third to fifth Eiō Tournaments ====
The main title match between the reigning Eiō and the challenger was originally a best-of-seven series with the first player to win four games becoming the Eiō title holder. The title match took place from April to June, and it was the only one of the best-of-seven major title matches not to follow a two-day-per-game format. (Note: Ryūō, Meijin, Ōi and Oshō title match games are played over a two-day period using a sealed move (or 封じ手 (Fūjjite)) system; the other two major title matches the Kiō and Kisei follow a best-of-five, one-day-per-game format.) It was also the only major title match in which the games are played at varying primary time controls, with the starting time for each game determined based upon the time control selected. A furigoma or "piece toss" took place at a pre-tournament publicity event held some weeks before the start of the match to announce the match venues, schedule and other details. The winner of the furigoma moved first in the first game and then the players alternated for the remaining games. The primary time control for each game was then determined by the players at the same event, with the player scheduled to move first in Game One selecting one of the following time controls for the first two games: one hour per player, (Note: Under the one-hour-per-player time control, two games are played in the same day.) three hours per player or five hours per player. The player who moves second in game three selects one of the two remaining time control options for games three and four, and the time control for games five and six will be the last remaining option. (Note: For example, if the player who moves first in the first game (i.e. the player who is sente) selects the primary control of one hour per player, that will also be the time control for Game Two. The player who moved second in Game Three (i.e. the player who is gote) could then select a time control of either three hours or five hours per player for Games Three and Four. The remaining unselected option would then be the time control for Games Five and Six.) The time control of the seventh and final game of the match would be six hours per player. Regardless of the time control selected for each game, there was also a secondary byo-yomi time control of sixty seconds per move.

==== 6th Eiō and onward ====
Starting with the 6th Eiō, the format of the title match was changed to best-of-five, and the time control for all games of the final match was changed to four hours per player followed by a secondary byo-yomi time control of sixty seconds per move.

== History ==
=== Shogi Denōsen series ===
In 2011, Dwango entered into an agreement with the JSA to co-sponsor a series of unofficial games and matches between professional shogi players and top computer shogi programs called the Shogi Denōsen.

The 1st Denōsen took place in 2012 between retired shogi professional Kunio Yonenaga and the program Bonkras, the reigning World Computer Shogi Champion, with the computer winning fairly easily. The 2nd Shogi Denōsen in 2013, 3rd Shogi Denōsen in 2014 and Shogi Denōsen Final in 2015 each featured a team of five shogi professionals playing against five computer shogi programs. All of the Shōgi Denōsen games were broadcast on Niconico, with the final game of the 3rd Shogi Denōsen being watched by more than 600,000 people.

=== Eiō and Denō Tournaments established ===
After the Shogi Denōsen Final finished, Dwango and the JSA announced that there would be no more five-on-five Shogi Denōsen matches, but rather two new tournaments would be sponsored by Dwango—the Eiō Tournament for the professionals and the Denō Tournament for the computers—with the winners of each then playing a two-game match held at a later date called the Denōsen.

The name "Eiō" was selected based upon the results of an online poll of Niconico users conducted by Dwango. The kanji "叡" means "clever" or "smart", while the kanji "王" is means "king" or "ruler", i.e. a leader of humans; so, the winner of the Eiō would wise and clever and represent humans against the representative "king" of the computers. Entry into the Eiō Tournament was optional and left to the decision of each player.

After the announcement that the 1st Eiō was going to take place, 154 shogi professionals expressed their desire to participate; five shogi professionals—including major title holders Yoshiharu Habu and Akira Watanabe—stated, however, that they would not. The 1st Eiō Tournament was won by Takayuki Yamasaki in December 2015; he then faced the Denō Tournament winner Ponanza in April–May 2016, but lost both games. The number of professionals participating in the 2nd Eiō Tournament was 158 (defending champion Yamazaki was seeded into the main tournament), but four, including Watanabe once again, decided to opt out. The tournament was won by Amahiko Satō, the then Meijin title holder, in December 2016; he then went on to face Ponanza, who repeated as Denō Tournament winner, in April–May 2017, but lost both games.

=== End of Denōsen matches and upgrade to major title status ===
In February 2017, Dwango and the JSA announced the 2nd Denōsen match would be the last to be held since the games between professionals and computers had fulfilled their intended purpose. After the 2nd Denosen match, Dwango announced that had reached an agreement with the JSA to upgrade the Eiō Tournament to major-title status and replace the two-game match against the Denō Tournament winner with a best-of-seven match between the reigning Eiō title holder and the winner of a challenger tournament. Since there would be no reigning title holder at the start of the 3rd Eiō Tournament in 2017, the two finalists of the challenger tournament would play a best-of-seven match to determine the winner of the Eiō title.

The upgrade in status of the Eiō Tournament made it the first new major title match in 34 years and the first to be sponsored by an IT company; in addition, the total prize fund for the tournament was also such that it made it the third highest among major title tournaments after only the Ryūō and Meijin. The first winner of the Eiō title was Taichi Takami in May 2018.

=== Change in tournament format ===
After the Eiō Tournament was upgraded to major title status, the final match to determine the overall winner for the third, fourth and fifth Eiō Tournaments was a best-of-seven format with the first player to win four games winning the match. On October 29, 2020, however, the JSA announced that title match format would change to a best-of-five format starting with the 6th Eiō Tournament in conjunction with Fujiya Co. replacing Dwango as the tournament's co-sponsor. In addition, the time control for each game of the final match would change to four hours per player followed by a secondary byo-yomi time control of sixty seconds per move. The change in sponsor dropped the Eio from third to sixth in importance of all major title matches.

== Sponsors ==
The first five Eiō tournaments were co-sponsored by Dwango and the JSA. On October 29, 2020, however, the JSA posted on its official website that the Japanese restaurant and confectionary company Fujiya Co. had replaced Dwango as the tournament's cosponsor starting with the 6th Eiō tournament

== Winners ==
The winners of the Eiō tournament are as follows.

No.	Year	Winner	Rank*	Score	Opponent	Rank*
Non-title tournament
1	2015	Takayuki Yamasaki	8-dan	2–0	Masataka Gōda	9-dan
2	2016	Amahiko Satō	9-dan	2–0	Shōta Chida	5-dan
Major title tournament
3	2017	Taichi Takami	6-dan	4–0	Kōta Kanai	5-dan
4	2018	Takuya Nagase	7-dan	4–0	Taichi Takami	Eiō
5	2019	Masayuki Toyoshima	9-dan	4–3–2 (Note: Game 2 and Game 3 of the match ended in impasse which meant that nine games needed to be played to determine the match winner.)	Takuya Nagase	Eiō
6	2020	Sōta Fujii	8-dan (Note: Fujii was ranked 8-dan at the start of tournament play, but was subsequently promoted to 9-dan during the tournament.)	3–2	Masayuki Toyoshima	Eiō
7	2021	Sōta Fujii (2)	Eiō	3–0	Wakamu Deguchi	5-dan (Note: Deguchi began the 7th Eiō tournament ranked 5-dan, but was promoted to 6-dan in April 2022.)
8	2022	Sōta Fujii (3)	Eiō	3–1	Tatsuya Sugai	8-dan
9	2023	Takumi Itō	7-dan	3–2	Sōta Fujii	Eiō
10	2024	Takumi Itō (2)	Eiō	3–2	Shintarō Saitō	8-dan

- Note: The "Rank" column indicates the rank held on April 1 of the shogi year (nendo) in which the tournament began.
