= Shingo (given name) =

- Gender: Male

Origin
- Origin: Japanese
- Meaning: Different meanings depending on the kanji used

Shingo (written: 慎吾, 真吾, 真悟, 晋呉, 信悟, 信五, 眞吾, 槙悟 or 臣吾) is a masculine Japanese given name. Notable people with the name include:

- Shingo Doi (土井 槙悟; born 1983), Japanese speed skater
- Hideki Shingo (新郷 英城; 1911–1982), Imperial Japanese Navy officer
- Shingo Hirafuji (平藤 眞吾; born 1963), Japanese shogi player
- Shingo Inoue (井上 真悟; born 1980), Japanese marathon runner
- Shingo Ito (footballer) (伊東 真吾; born 1979), Japanese footballer
- Shingo Itō (shogi) (伊藤 真吾; born 1982), Japanese shogi player
- Shingo Kai (甲斐 真吾; born 1963), Japanese water polo player
- Shingo Katayama (片山 晋呉; born 1973), Japanese golfer
- Shingo Katori (香取 慎吾; born 1977), member of SMAP, a Japanese male idol group
- Shingo Kawabata (川畑 伸吾; born 1978), Japanese sprinter
- Shingo Kawabata (baseball) (川端 慎吾; born 1987), Japanese baseball player
- Shingo Matsumoto (松本 慎吾; born 1978), Japanese sport wrestler
- Shingo Murakami (村上 信五; born 1982), Japanese singer, actor and idol
- Shingo Natsume (夏目真悟; born 1980), Japanese director
- Shingo Sawada (澤田 真吾; born 1991), Japanese shogi player
- Shingo Takatsu (高津 臣吾; born 1968), Japanese baseball player
- Shingo Takagi (鷹木 信悟; born 1982), Japanese professional wrestler

== Fictional characters ==
- Shingo, a character in the anime series Uninhabited Planet Survive!
- Shingo, a character in the Skate video game series
- Shingo Aoi, a character in the Captain Tsubasa series
- Shingo Hirose, a character in the Tetro Danganronpa: BLUE video series
- Shingo Mido, a character in the manga series Death Note
- Shingo Tsukino, a character appearing in manga series Sailor Moon
- Shingo Yabuki, a character in the King of Fighters series
- Shingo Shoji, a character in the Initial D series
- Shingo Wakamoto, a main character of Prison School
