= Kazuo Sugimoto =

Japanese shogi player (born 1991)

- Native name: 杉本和陽
- Born: September 1, 1991 (age 34)
- Hometown: Ōta, Tokyo

Career
- Achieved professional status: April 1, 2017 (aged 25)
- Badge Number: 310
- Rank: 6-dan
- Teacher: Kunio Yonenaga (9-dan)
- Meijin class: C2
- Ryūō class: 4

Websites
- JSA profile page

Kazuo Sugimoto (杉本 和陽, Sugimoto Kazuo; born September 1, 1991) is a Japanese professional shogi player ranked 6-dan.

== Early life, amateur shogi and apprenticeship ==
Sugimoto was born in Ōta, Tokyo on September 1, 1991. He learned how to play shogi from watching his father (an amateur 2-dan) play. As a sixth-grade student at Tamagawa Elementary School in 2003, Sugimoto won the 28th Elementary School Student Meijin Tournament, defeating fellow future professional Takuya Ishida in the semi-finals.

Later in 2003, Sugimoto entered the Japan Shogi Association's apprentice school at the rank of 6-kyū as a student of shogi professional Kunio Yonenaga. He was promoted to the rank of 3-dan in 2008 and obtained professional status and the rank of 4-dan in April 2017 after finishing second to Nishida in the 60th 3-dan League (October 2016 – March 2017) with a record of 12 wins and 6 losses.

== Shogi professional ==
In April 2025, Sugimoto defeated Takuya Nagase in the finals of the 96th Kisei challenger tournament to advance to his first major title match and earn the right to challenge the reigning Kisei Sōta Fujii for the 96th Kisei Title. The win also meant Sugimoto satisfied the criteria for promotion to 6-dan. In the June 2025 title match, however, Sugimoto was unable to continue his good form and lost the best-of-five match to Fujii 3 games to none.

=== Promotion history ===
The promotion history for Sugimoto is as follows.

- 6-kyū: September 2003
- 3-dan: October 2008
- 4-dan: April 1, 2017
- 5-dan: July 8, 2021
- 6-dan: April 25, 2025

=== Titles and other championships ===
Sugimoto has appeared in one major title match but lost the match.
