= Wakamu Deguchi =

Japanese shogi player (born 1995)

- Native name: 出口若武
- Born: April 28, 1995 (age 31)
- Hometown: Akashi, Hyōgo

Career
- Achieved professional status: April 1, 2019 (aged 23)
- Badge number: 317
- Rank: 6-dan
- Teacher: Keita Inoue (9-dan)
- Meijin class: C1
- Ryūō class: 5

Websites
- JSA profile page

Wakamu Deguchi (出口 若武, Deguchi Wakamu; born April 28, 1995) is a Japanese professional shogi player ranked 6-dan.

== Early life and apprentice professional ==
Deguchi was born on April 27, 1987, in Akashi, Hyōgo. He learned how to play shogi while a lower-grade elementary school student from a fellow student. Although he was more interested in soccer at the time, he got asked to play in some local shogi tournaments and did well. He began getting more serious about shogi and started receiving instruction at the Kakogawa Shogi Center in nearby Kakogawa to improve his play. He was accepted into the Japan Shogi Association's apprentice school under the guidance of shogi professional Keita Inoue at the rank of 6-kyū in 2007 when he was a sixth-grade elementary school student. He was promoted to the rank of apprentice professional 3-dan in 2013, and obtained full professional status and the corresponding rank of 4-dan in April 2019 after winning the 64th 3-dan League (October 2018 – March 2019) with a record of 14 wins and 4 losses.

== Shogi professional ==
In October 2018, Deguchi, still only an apprentice professional 3-dan, advanced to the finals of the 49th Shinjin-Ō tournament, but lost to shogi professional Sōta Fujii 2 games to none. Deguchi defeated shogi professionals Shingo Sawada (in the second round) and Hirotaka Kajiura (in the semi-finals) to become just the fifth apprentice professional to advance to the finals of the tournament.

=== Promotion history ===
Deguchi's promotion history is as follows:

- 6-kyū: September 2007
- 3-dan: April 2013
- 4-dan: April 1, 2019
- 5-dan: March 5, 2021
- 6-dan: April 2, 2022

=== Titles and other championships ===
Deguchi has appeared in a major title match once. He was the challenger to Sōta Fujii in the 7th Eiō title match (April 2022 – May 2022) but lost the match 3 games to 0.

== Personal life ==
Deguchi married women's shogi professional Keika Kitamura in April 2021.
