= Michiyoshi =

- Gender: Male

Origin
- Origin: Japanese
- Meaning: Different meanings depending on the kanji used

Michiyoshi (written: 道由, 道義, 道美 or 通芳) is a masculine Japanese given name. Notable people with the name include:

- Michiyoshi Doi (土居 通芳; 1926–1975), Japanese film director
- Michiyoshi Ohara (小原 道由; born 1967), Japanese professional wrestler and mixed martial artist
- Michiyoshi Yamada (山田 道美; 1933–1970), Japanese shogi player
- Michiyoshi Yunoki (柚木 道義; born 1972), Japanese politician
