= Takumi Itō =

Japanese shogi player (born 2002)

- Native name: 伊藤匠
- Born: October 10, 2002 (age 24)
- Hometown: Setagaya, Tokyo

Career
- Achieved professional status: October 1, 2020 (aged 17)
- Badge number: 324
- Rank: 9-dan
- Teacher: Toshio Miyata (8-dan)
- Current major titles: Eiō
- Major titles won: 3
- Tournaments won: 1
- Meijin class: A
- Ryūō class: 1

Websites
- JSA profile page

Takumi Itō (伊藤 匠, Itō Takumi; October 10, 2002) is a Japanese professional shogi player ranked 9-dan. He is the current holder of the Eiō title and a former holder of the Ōza title.

== Early life, amateur shogi and apprentice professional ==
Itō was born in Setagaya, Tokyo, on October 10, 2002. He learned how to play shogi from his father when he was about five years old.

As a second grade elementary school student in 2010, Itō represented Tokyo in the 9th All Japan Elementary School Student Kurashiki Ōshō Tournament and finished in second place. At the World Open Shogi Championships held in Minsk, Belarus in July 2013, Itō finished 9–0 to win the tournament as a fifth grade elementary school student.

Itō entered the Japan Shogi Association's apprentice school in September 2013 at the rank of 6-kyū when he was a fifth grade elementary school student under the guidance of shogi professional Toshio Miyata. Itō was promoted to the rank of apprentice professional 3-dan in April 2018 and obtained full professional status and the rank of 4-dan after winning the 67th 3-dan League (April –September 2020) with a record of 15 wins and 3 losses.

== Shogi professional ==
In September–October 2021, Itō defeated Yūsei Koga 2 games to none to win the 52nd Shinjin-Ō tournament.

Itō's first appearance in a major title match came in October–November 2023 when he challenged Sōta Fujii for the 36th Ryūō title. Itō advanced to the title match by defeating Ōza title holder Takuya Nagase 2 games to none in the best-of-three challenger match (July–August 2023), but lost the best-of-seven title match to Fujii 4 games to none. By becoming the challenger for the Ryūō title, Itō also satisfied the promotion criteria for 7-dan. In December 2023, Ito defeated Akihito Hirose to win the challenger's tournament for the 48th Kiō Tournament, and advance to the title match against Fujii; Itō had actually lost to Hirose in an earlier round, but advanced to the finals through the loser's bracket, which meant he needed to win two games in a row as opposed to Hirose who only needing to win one of two games. In the 48th Kiō title match (February–March 2024), however, Itō was unable to break through and lost the match 3 games to 0, although four games needed to be played due to Game 1 ending in impasse.

In March 2024, Itō defeated Nagase in the 9th Eiō challenger tournament to advance to the title match against the reigning Eiō Fujii. Going into the 9th Eiō title match (April–June 2024), Itō had yet to beat Fujii in eleven official games (ten losses and one impasse), which included two defeats in major title matches. In 9th Eiō major title match, Itō started poorly by losing Game 1, but was able to win Games 2, 3 and 5 to win the match 3 games to 2. The victory not only gave Itō his first major title, but it also ended Fujii's consecutive major title match winning streak at 22.

Itō's first defense of the Eiō title was a successful one, defeating challenger Shintarō Saitō 3 games to 2 in the 10th Eiō title match (April–June 2025). The win not only gave Itō his second major title overall but also qualified him for promotion to 8-dan. Itō earned promotion to the rank of 9-dan and became a 2-crown title holder for the first time when he defeated Fujii 3 games to 2 in the 73rd Ōza title match (September–October 2025).

In the 11th Eiō title match (April–June 2026), Itō and Saitō faced each other once again; like the year before, Ito was able to defend his title by winning the match 3 games to 2. Itō and Fujii also faced each other again in the 67th Ōi title match (July–September 2026), but this time Fujii was able to successfully defend his title by winning the match 4 games to 2.

In the 74th Ōza title match (September–October 2026), Ito was unable to defend his title, losing the best-of-five match 3 games to 2 to the challenger Akihito Hirose.

=== Promotion history ===
The promotion history for Itō is as follows.

- 6-kyū: September 1, 2013
- 3-dan: April 2018
- 4-dan: October 1, 2020
- 5-dan: March 10, 2022
- 6-dan: April 20, 2023
- 7-dan: August 14, 2023
- 8-dan: June 14, 2025
- 9-dan: October 28, 2025

=== Titles and other championships ===
Itō has appeared in eight major title matches and has won four major titles. He has also won one non-major title tournament.

=== Awards and honors ===
Itō won the Japan Shogi Association's Annual Shogi Awards for "Best New Player" and "Best Winning Percentage" for the April 2022 – March 2023 shogi year; "Excellent Player", "Most Games Won", (Note: Itō and Nagisa Fujimoto each won 51 games to share the award.) "Most Games Played" and the Masuda Award for the April 2023 – March 2024 shogi year; and "Excellent Player" and "Game of the Year" (Note: Game 5 of the 9th Eiō title match against Sōta Fujii.) for the April 2024 – March 2025 shogi year.

=== Year-end prize money and game fee ranking ===
Itō has finished in the "Top 10" of the JSA's year-end prize money and game fee rankings three times: tenth with JPY 17,280,000 in earnings in 2023; second with JPY 43,640,000 in earnings in 2024; and fourth with JPY 40,870,000 in earnings in 2025.
