= Singo (disambiguation) =

Singo is a village in the Ivory Coast. Singo may also refer to:

- Singö, island in Sweden
- Wilfried Singo (born 2000), Ivorian footballer
- Singo Ulung, dance
- S v Singo, South African law case
- For the Japanese location name or given name (spelled "Singo" in Kunrei-shiki), see Shingo (disambiguation)
