= Yasuhiro Masuda =

Japanese shogi player (born 1997)

- Native name: 増田康宏
- Born: November 4, 1997 (age 28)
- Hometown: Akishima, Tokyo

Career
- Achieved professional status: October 1, 2014 (aged 16)
- Badge number: 297
- Rank: 8-dan
- Teacher: Taku Morishita (9-dan)
- Tournaments won: 2
- Meijin class: A
- Ryūō class: 3

Websites
- JSA profile page

Yasuhiro Masuda (増田 康宏, Masuda Yasuhiro; born November 4, 1997) is a Japanese professional shogi player ranked 8-dan.

== Early life, amateur shogi and apprenticeship ==
Yasuhiro Masuda was born on November 4, 1997, in Akishima, Tokyo. (Note: Masuda is the first person born after Yoshiharu Habu became a 7-crown (hold seven major titles simultaneously) in 1996 to become a shogi professional.) He learned shogi when he was about five years old after his mother brought home a board game box which included a shogi set. Masuda won the upper-grade section of the Elementary School Student Kurashiki Ōshō Tournament as an elementary school fourth-grade student in 2007, and the following year finished tied for third place in the Elementary School Student Meijin Tournament.

In September 2008, Masuda entered the Japan Shogi Association's apprentice school at the rank of 6-kyū under the guidance of shogi professional Taku Morishita. He was promoted to the rank of 3-dan in April 2012, and obtained full professional status and the rank of 4-dan in October 2014 while a second-year high school student after finishing tied for first in the 55th 3-dan League with a record of 13 wins and 5 losses.

== Shogi professional ==
In October 2016, Masuda won his first professional shogi tournament when he defeated Naohiro Ishida 2 games to none to win the 47th Shinjin-Ō title. He repeated the feat the following year when he defeated Daichi Sasaki 2 games to none to win the 48th Shinjin-Ō, thus becoming the first repeat winner since Takeshi Fujii in 1997. Masuda also advanced to the championship match of the 50th Shinjin-Ō tournament in October 2019 against Satoshi Takano and his attempt to become just the second three-time winner of the tournament started promising by winning Game 1; Takano, however, came back to win the next two games and the match.

On June 26, 2017, Masuda lost to Sōta Fujii in Ryūō ranking class game which was streamed live online and had received much pre-game press coverage both within Japan and internationally because a Fujii victory would allow him to set a new professional shogi record of 29 consecutive wins.

In December 2024, Masuda defeated Asuto Saitō in the best-of-two finals of the 50th Kiō challenger determination tournament to qualify for a major title match for the first time. In the 50th Kiō title match (February–March 2025) against defending Kiō title holder Fujii, Masuda lost the match 3 games to none. Reflecting on his first title match appearance in the post-match press conference held after Game 3, Masuda stated that he thought he played well during the opening phases of each game and was able to keep the games close, but had trouble in the middle game, even when he had an advantageous position, and felt that was where he was unable to match Fujii.

Masuda challenged Fujji for the Kiō title for the second year in row and was leading the 51st Kiō Title Match (February–March 2026) two games to one after winning Game 3 to move within one win of his first major title; however, he was unable to close out the match and Fujii won the next two games to defend his title.

=== Promotion history ===
The promotion history for Masuda is as follows:

- 6-kyū: September 2008
- 3-dan: April 2012
- 4-dan: October 1, 2014
- 5-dan: January 12, 2018
- 6-dan: May 22, 2018
- 7-dan: February 8, 2023
- 8-dan: March 7, 2024

=== Titles and other championships ===
Masuda has appeared in two major title matches, but has yet to win a major title; he is, however, a two-time winner of the Shinjin-Ō tournament.

=== Year-end prize money and game fee ranking ===
Masuda has finished in the "Top 10" of the JSA's year-end prize money and game fee rankings once: seventh with JPY 17,190,000 in earnings in 2025.
