= Yuki Sasaki =

Yuki Sasaki may refer to:

- Yuki Sasaki (mixed martial artist) (佐々木 有生, born 1976), Japanese mixed martial artist
- Yūki Sasaki (shogi) (佐々木 勇気, born 1994), Japanese shogi player
