= Keika Kitamura =

Japanese shogi player (born 1995)

- Native name: 北村桂香
- Born: November 14, 1995 (age 30)
- Hometown: Uji, Kyoto Prefecture

Career
- Achieved professional status: June 24, 2013 (aged 17)
- Badge number: W-46
- Rank: Women's 2-dan
- Teacher: Kenji Kobayashi (9-dan)

Websites
- JSA profile page

Keika Kitamura (北村 桂香, Kitamura Keika; born November 14, 1995) is a Japanese women's professional shogi player ranked 2-dan.

== Women's shogi professional ==
=== Promotion history ===
Kitamura's promotion history is as follows:

- 3-kyū: April 1, 2013
- 2-kyū: June 24, 2013
- 1-kyū: April 1, 2014
- 1-dan: June 26, 2015
- 2-dan: January 18, 2023

Note: All ranks are women's professional ranks.

== Personal life ==
Kitamura is a graduate of Ritsumeikan University. Kitamura married professional shogi player Wakamu Deguchi in April 2021. She stated that she will continue to be active professionally under her maiden name.
