= Shingo =

Shingo can refer to:

== Religion ==
- Shingon Buddhism

== Locations ==
- Shingō, Okayama (神郷町), a town located in Atetsu District, Okayama Prefecture, Japan
- Shingō, Aomori (新郷村), a village located in Sannohe District, Aomori Prefecture, Japan which claims to be the final resting place of Jesus Christ

== People ==
- Shingo (given name)
