= Yūki Sasaki (shogi) =

Japanese shogi player (born 1994)

- Native name: 佐々木勇気
- Born: August 5, 1994 (age 31)
- Hometown: Misato, Japan

Career
- Achieved professional status: October 1, 2010 (aged 16)
- Badge Number: 280
- Rank: 8-dan
- Teacher: Kazuo Ishida (9-dan)
- Tournaments won: 2
- Meijin class: A
- Ryūō class: 1

Websites
- JSA profile page

Yūki Sasaki (佐々木 勇気, Sasaki Yūki; born August 5, 1994) is a Japanese professional shogi player ranked 8-dan.

== Early life, amateur shogi and apprentice professional ==
Sasaki was born in Geneva, Switzerland, on August 5, 1994. His family moved to France when he was two years old and then returned to Misato in Saitama Prefecture, Japan when he was about five.

As a young boy, Sasaki liked playing outdoors. His middle ear, however, became inflamed from swimming, and his doctor advised his parents to limit his playing to indoors for a while until it healed. Sasaki's father played the game go, but Sasaki started studying shogi at the prodding of his mother because she was worried that her son might mistakenly swallow one of the go pieces.

As a first-grade elementary school student, he was already playing against adults at his local shogi club and was soon going to the club six days a week. In 2003, Sasaki won the lower-grade section of the 2nd Elementary School Student Kurashiki Ōshō Tournament as a third-grade student, and then the following year he won the 29th Elementary School Student Meijin Tournament as a fourth-grade student to become just the second fourth grader, after Akira Watanabe, to win the tournament.

In September 2004, Sasaki was accepted into the Japan Shogi Association's apprentice school at the rank of 6-kyū under the guidance of shogi professional Kazuo Ishida. In April 2008, Sasaki was promoted to the rank of appentice-professional 3-dan as a second-year junior high school student, which at the time tied the record for being the second fastest person to do so since entering the apprentice school. He obtained full professional status and the rank of 4-dan in October 2010 after winning the 47th 3-dan League (April 2010 – September 2010) with a record of 14 wins and 4 losses. Sasaki was 16 years and 1 month old and still a junior high school student when he was awarded professional status, thus becoming just the sixth junior high school student to turn professional.

== Shogi professional ==
Sasaki's first non-title tournament as a professional came in October 2013 when he defeated Shōta Chida 2 games to 1 to win the 3rd Kakogawa Seiryū Tournament.

In June 2017, Sasaki ended Sōta Fujii's record-breaking winning streak.

In March 2023, Sasaki and Fujii met in the championship of the 72nd NHK Cup tournament, with Fujii winning the game. The following year the two met again in the championship game of the 73rd NHK Cup tournament, but this time it was Sasaki who came out victorious.

In August 2024, Sasaki defeated Akihito Hirose 2 games to none to win the best-of-three 37th Ryūō Challenger Determination Match and advance to a major title match for the first time. In the 37th Ryūō Title Match (October – December 2024), Sasaki was tied with Fujii Ryūō at two wins apiece after 4 games, but lost the next two games to lose the match 4 games to 2.

For the second year in a row, Sasaki won the challenger round of the Ryūō tournament to advance to the main title match against the reigning Ryūō Fujii but lost the 38th Ryūō Title Match (October–November 2025) 4 games to none.

=== Promotion history ===
Sasaki's promotion history is as follows:

- 6-kyū: 2004
- 3-dan: 2008
- 4-dan: October 1, 2010
- 5-dan: March 11, 2014
- 6-dan: July 11, 2017
- 7-dan: November 16, 2018
- 8-dan: March 9, 2023

=== Titles and other championships ===
Sasaki has appeared in two major title matches, but he has yet to win a major title; he, however, has won two non-title tournaments.

=== Awards and honors ===
Sasaki won the Japan Shogi Association's Annual Shogi Awards for "Most Games Played" (65 games) in 2017, and the Kōzō Masuda Award for the Yūki Side Pawn Capture in 2018.

=== Year-end prize money and game fee ranking ===
Sasaki has finished in the "Top 10" of the JSA's year-end prize money and game fee rankings twice: fourth with JPY 29,000,000 in earnings in 2024 and third with JPY 41,330,000 in earnings in 2025.
