= Shingo Itō =

Japanese shogi player

- Native name: 伊藤真吾
- Born: January 4, 1982 (age 44)
- Hometown: Hachiōji, Tokyo

Career
- Achieved professional status: April 1, 2007 (aged 25)
- Badge number: 266
- Rank: 6-dan
- Teacher: Noboru Sakurai (8-dan)
- Meijin class: C2
- Ryūō class: 4

Websites
- JSA profile page

Shingo Itō (伊藤 真吾, Itō Shingo; born January 4, 1982) is a Japanese professional shogi player ranked 6-dan.

== Early life, education and apprenticeship ==
Itō was born in Hachiōji, Tokyo on January 4, 1982. He learned how to play shogi from his father when he was around five years old, and entered the Japan Shogi Association's apprentice school at the rank of 6-kyū under the guidance of shogi professional Noboru Sakurai in 1993.

Itō was promoted to the rank of apprentice professional 1-dan in 1998, and apprentice professional 3-dan in 2002. He obtained full professional status and the corresponding rank of 4-dan on April 1, 2007, after finishing in the 40th 3-dan League (October 2006 – March 2007) with a record of 13 wins and 5 losses. Although Itō finished league play in third place one win behind Masayuki Toyoshima and Kōta Kanai, his result was good enough to earn him a second promotion point and gave him the option to enter the professional ranks as a free class player, which he decided to do. Itō was the second player after Yūsuke Ina to obtain professional status under the promotion point system.

== Shogi professional ==
=== Promotion history ===
The promotion history for Itō is as follows:

- 6-kyū: September 1993
- 4-dan: April 1, 2007
- 5-dan: October 25, 2013
- 6-dan: May 13, 2021

== Personal life ==
Itō is an alumnus of Asia University, graduating from the university's Faculty of Business Management in 2004.
