= Masao Tsukada =

Japanese shogi player (1914–1977)

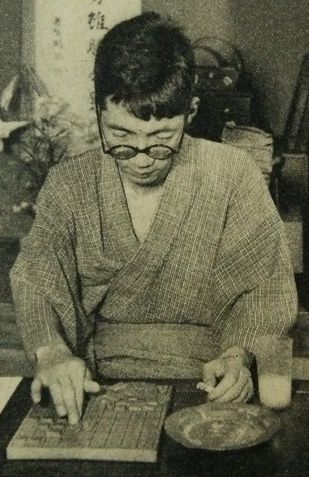
- Tsukada in 1952.
- Native name: 塚田正夫
- Born: August 2, 1914
- Hometown: Bunkyō
- Nationality: Japanese
- Died: December 30, 1977 (aged 63)

Career
- Achieved professional status: January 1, 1932 (aged 17)
- Badge Number: 11
- Rank: 10 dan
- Teacher: Chōtarō Hanada
- Lifetime titles: Lifetime Ninth Dan
- Major titles won: 6
- Tournaments won: 4
- Notable students: Yukio Miyasaka

Websites
- JSA profile page

Masao Tsukada (塚田 正夫, tsukada masao; August 2, 1914 – December 30, 1977) was a Japanese professional shogi player who achieved the rank of 8-dan (the highest dan at the time) and also 10-dan, which is an honorary rank, after death. He is a former Meijin and Ninth Dan title holder.

== Early life ==
Masao Tsukada was born in Bunkyō, Tokyo, Japan, in 1914. Growing up, he was influenced by his family's strong interest in traditional Japanese games, particularly shogi. From an early age, Tsukada showed a keen interest in the game and was mentored by several local players before being introduced to his primary teacher, Chōtarō Hanada, who played a key role in shaping his professional shogi career.

He entered the Japan Shogi Association (JSA) at the age of 17, demonstrating his potential in shogi. Tsukada's early training was rigorous, involving a combination of private lessons and competition in various local tournaments.

== Shogi professional ==
Tsukada made his professional debut at the young age of 17, starting in the 1932 Shogi professional league. His quick rise in the ranks was impressive, and by 1935, he had achieved the 4-dan rank, making him one of the youngest rising stars in the shogi world at the time.

In the years following his promotion, Tsukada honed his strategic thinking and developed a unique playing style characterized by aggressive attacks and deep positional understanding. This made him a formidable opponent in shogi tournaments. Tsukada's ability to read the board and anticipate moves ahead of time set him apart from many of his peers.

He began competing in major tournaments in the late 1930s and early 1940s, securing several victories that helped him establish a reputation as one of Japan's top shogi professionals. By 1947, Tsukada had already won the prestigious Meijin title, which was regarded as the most significant achievement in the shogi world. Tsukada defended his Meijin title successfully in 1948, further cementing his status as a dominant force in shogi.

== Promotion history ==
Tsukada's promotion history is marked by a series of significant milestones. Achieving 5-dan in 1937, he continued to progress rapidly through the ranks. By the time he reached 8-dan in 1947, Tsukada was widely regarded as one of the greatest players in shogi history.

In 1952, Tsukada won the Ninth Dan title, which was the highest achievable rank at the time, and successfully defended it in subsequent years. The Ninth Dan title was eventually reformed into a permanent rank, with Tsukada being awarded the honorary Lifetime Ninth Dan title due to his consistent dominance and contributions to the game.

Over the course of his career, Tsukada's ranking reached 10-dan, a rare honor granted posthumously, in recognition of his groundbreaking achievements and exceptional skill. He remains one of the few players to hold this distinction.

== Titles and other championships ==
Tsukada's career was marked by his participation in major title matches, where he consistently proved his skill and strategic acumen. He won the Meijin title twice, in 1947 and 1948, during which time he showcased his brilliant decision-making ability and mastery of the game's complex strategies.

In addition to the Meijin title, Tsukada was a frequent contender in other major tournaments. He won the Ninth Dan title a total of four times from 1952 to 1955, including three consecutive victories, which qualified him for the prestigious Lifetime Ninth Dan title. This honor was a recognition of his sustained excellence in the shogi community.

Beyond the major titles, Tsukada won several other championships, including the NHK Cup in 1953 and the Ōza tournament in 1958. His career achievements also include victories in the All-Japan Championship.

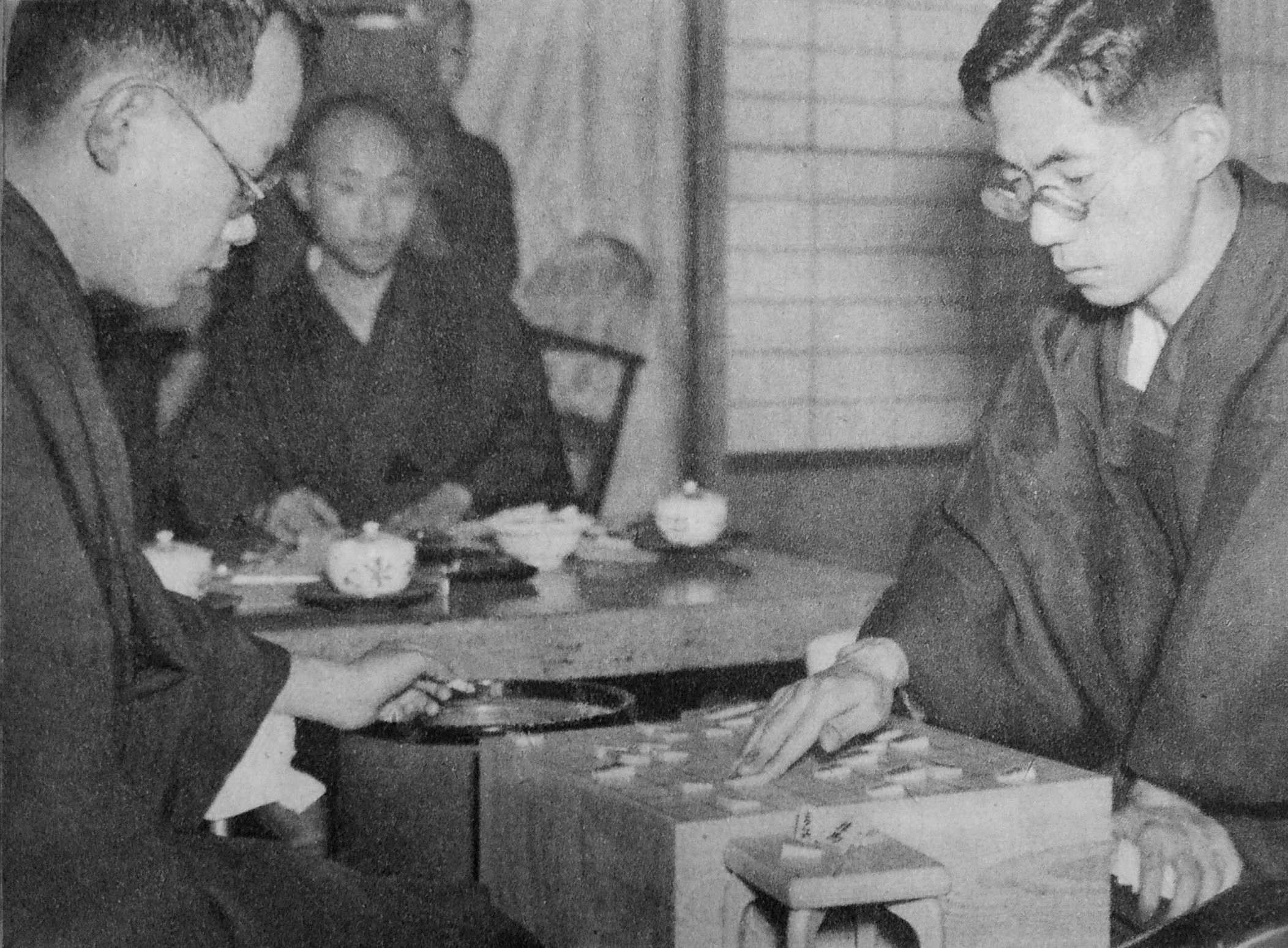
Tsukada (right) playing against Yasuharu Ōyama in 1948 for Meijin.

=== Major titles ===
Title	Years	Number of times overall
Meijin	1947, 1948	2
Ninth Dan (Ryūō)	1952–1955	4

=== Other championships ===
Tournament	Years	Number of times
NHK Cup	1953	1
Ōza (then a nontitle tournament)	1958	1
^{†}全日本選手権名人九段戦	1952, 1954	2

Note: Tournaments marked with a cross (†) are no longer held.

== Awards and honors ==
Throughout his illustrious career, Tsukada received numerous awards and honors recognizing his exceptional contributions to the world of shogi. Among the most prestigious awards were the Medal with Purple Ribbon and the Order of the Rising Sun, 4th class, both of which were granted by the Japanese government for his cultural contributions to Japan.

In addition to his government honors, Tsukada was a respected figure within the Japan Shogi Association (JSA), serving as the president and helping to shape the future of the game in Japan. His efforts to modernize the game and make it more accessible to a broader audience were instrumental in the continued popularity of shogi both domestically and internationally.
