= Yūsuke Ina =

Japanese shogi player

- Native name: 伊奈祐介
- Born: December 18, 1975 (age 49)
- Hometown: Zushi, Kanagawa

Career
- Achieved professional status: April 1, 1998 (aged 22)
- Badge Number: 228
- Rank: 7-dan
- Retired: May 10, 2024 (aged 48)
- Teacher: Kenji Kobayashi (9-dan)
- Career record: 353–351 (.501)

Websites
- JSA profile page

Yūsuke Ina (伊奈 祐介, Ina Yūsuke; born December 18, 1975) is a Japanese retired professional shogi player who achieved the rank of 7-dan.

== Early life and apprenticeship ==
Ina was born in Zushi, Kanagawa on December 18, 1975. He entered the Japan Shogi Association's Apprentice School as a student of Kenji Kobayashi at the rank of 6-kyū in January 1990 and obtained full professional status and the rank of 4-dan in April 1998.

== Shogi professional ==
Ina finished the 72nd Meijin Class C2 league (April 2013 – March 2014) with a record of 3 wins and 7 losses, earning a third demotion point, which meant automatic demotion to "Free Class" play.

On April 1, 2024, the JSA posted on its official website that Ina had met the conditions for mandatory requirement for Free Class players, and that his retirement would become official upon completion of his current playing schedule. Ina's retirement became official on May 10, 2024, after losing a Class 5 37th Ryūō League relegation game to Satoru Sakaguchi. Ina retired with a career record of 353 wins and 351 losses for a 0.501 winning percentage.

=== Promotion history ===
The promotion history for Ina is as follows:

- 6-kyū: 1990
- 1-dan: 1992
- 4-dan: April 1, 1998
- 5-dan: August 13, 2004
- 6-dan: May 22, 2008
- 7-dan: October 23, 2019
- Retired: May 10, 2024

== Personal life ==
Ina's wife is a professional go player, and his younger sister is married to shogi professional Akira Watanabe.
