= Daichi Sasaki =

Japanese shogi player (born 1995)

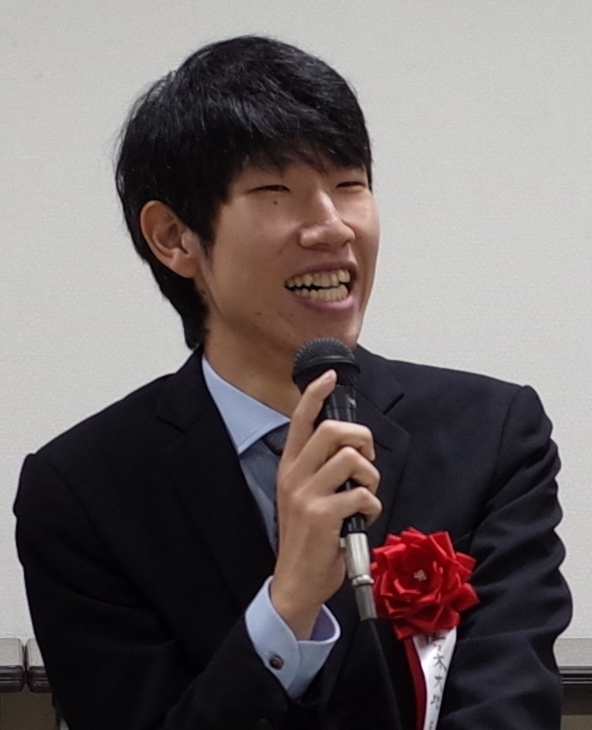
- Native name: 佐々木大地
- Born: May 30, 1995 (age 31)
- Hometown: Tsushima, Nagasaki

Career
- Achieved professional status: April 1, 2016 (aged 20)
- Badge number: 306
- Rank: 7-dan
- Teacher: Kōichi Fukaura (9-dan)
- Meijin class: C1
- Ryūō class: 3

Websites
- JSA profile page

Daichi Sasaki (佐々木 大地, Sasaki Daichi; born May 30, 1995) is a Japanese professional shogi player ranked 7-dan.

== Early life, amateur shogi and apprenticeship ==
Sasaki was born in Tsushima, Nagasaki on May 30, 1995. He learned shogi from his father when he was three years old. As a third-grade elementary school student, he won the Grades 1 to 3 division of the 3rd All Japan Elementary School Student Kurashiki Ōshō Tournament in 2004. Then, as a sixth-grade elementary school student in 2007, he finished reached the semi-finals of the 32nd Elementary School Student Meijin Tournament, but lost to fellow future professional Seiya Kondō.

The following year, Sasaki entered the Japan Shogi Association's apprentice school at the rank of 6-kyū as a student of shogi professional Kōichi Fukaura. He was promoted to the rank or 3-dan in 2013, and obtained professional status and the rank of 4-dan in April 2016 after finishing the 58th 3-dan League (October 2015 – March 2016) with a record of 12 wins and 6 losses. Although Sasaki actually finished league play tied with several other players who also had 12 wins, his lower league seed meant he finished in third place and thus did not earn automatic promotion to the rank of 4-dan. Third place, however, was good enough to earn him a second promotion point, and gave him the option to enter the professional ranks as a free class player.

== Shogi professional ==
Sasaki made his first appearance in a major title match in June 2023 when he challenged Sōta Fujii for the 94th Kisei title (June–July 2023) but lost the match 3 games to 1. The following month, Sasaki also challenged Fujii for the 64th Ōi title (July–August 2023) but lost again, this time 4 games to 1.

=== Promotion history ===
Sasaki's promotion history is as follows:

- 6-kyū: September 2008
- 3-dan: October 2013
- 4-dan: April 1, 2016
- 5-dan: February 20, 2019
- 6-dan: February 16, 2022
- 7-dan: April 28, 2022

=== Titles and other championships ===
Ssaki's has appeared in a major title match twice, but has yet to win a title.

=== Awards and honors ===
Sasaki received the Japan Shogi Association Annual Shogi Awards for "Most Games Won" for the 2018–19 shogi year, "Most Games Played" for the 2019–2020 shogi year, and "Most Consecutive Games Won" for the 2023–24 shogi year.

=== Year-end prize money and game fee ranking ===
Sasaki has finished in the "Top 10" of the JSA's year-end prize money and game fee rankings once: 8th with JPY 18,810,000 in earnings in 2023.
