= Fujiya =

Japanese confectionery store chain

Fujiya Co. Ltd.

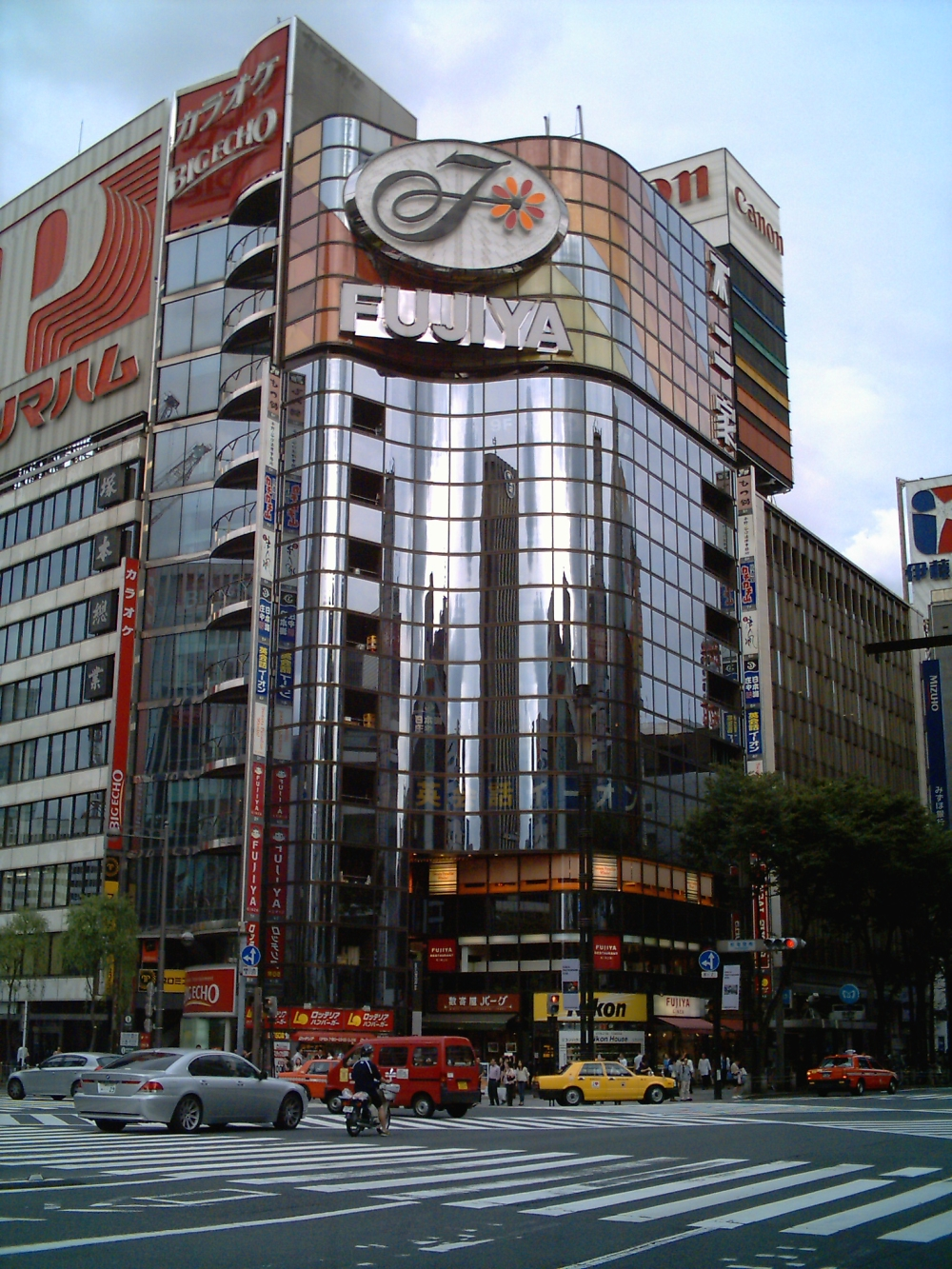
- Store in Ginza, Tokyo
- Native name: 株式会社不二家
- Company type: Public K.K.
- Traded as: TYO: 2211
- Founded: June 30, 1938; 87 years ago
- Founder: Rin'emon Fujii
- Headquarters: Tokyo, Japan
- Area served: Japan
- Key people: Kensuke Yamada (Chairman); Nobuyuki Kawamura (President)
- Owner: Yamazaki Baking; Bandai Namco Holdings (1.93%)

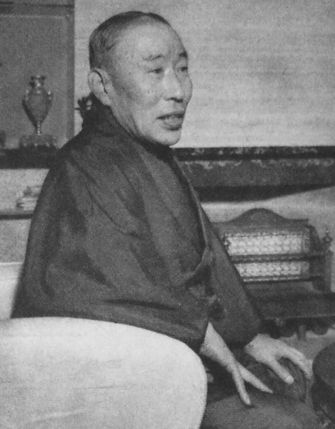
Fujii Rin'emon, founder of Fujiya (1955)

Fujiya Co. Ltd. (株式会社不二家, Kabushiki Gaisha Fujiya) (TYO: 2211) is a nationwide chain of confectionery stores and restaurants in Japan. Its first shop was founded in 1910 in Yokohama.

Fujiya is credited with introducing the Christmas cake to Japan.

In 2016, the company opened its first store outside Japan in Taipei, Taiwan.

== Mascot ==
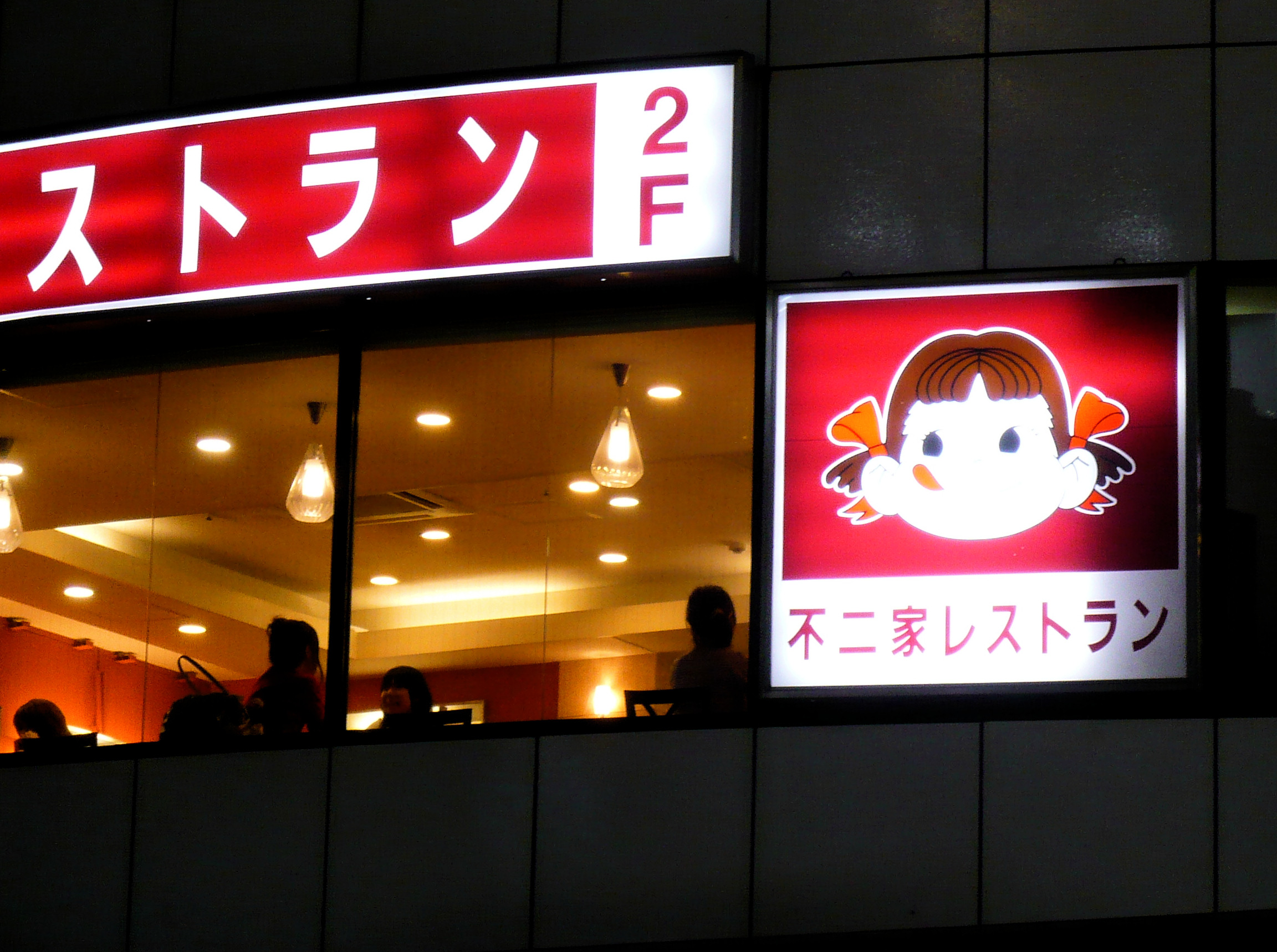
Fujiya's mascot, Peko-chan

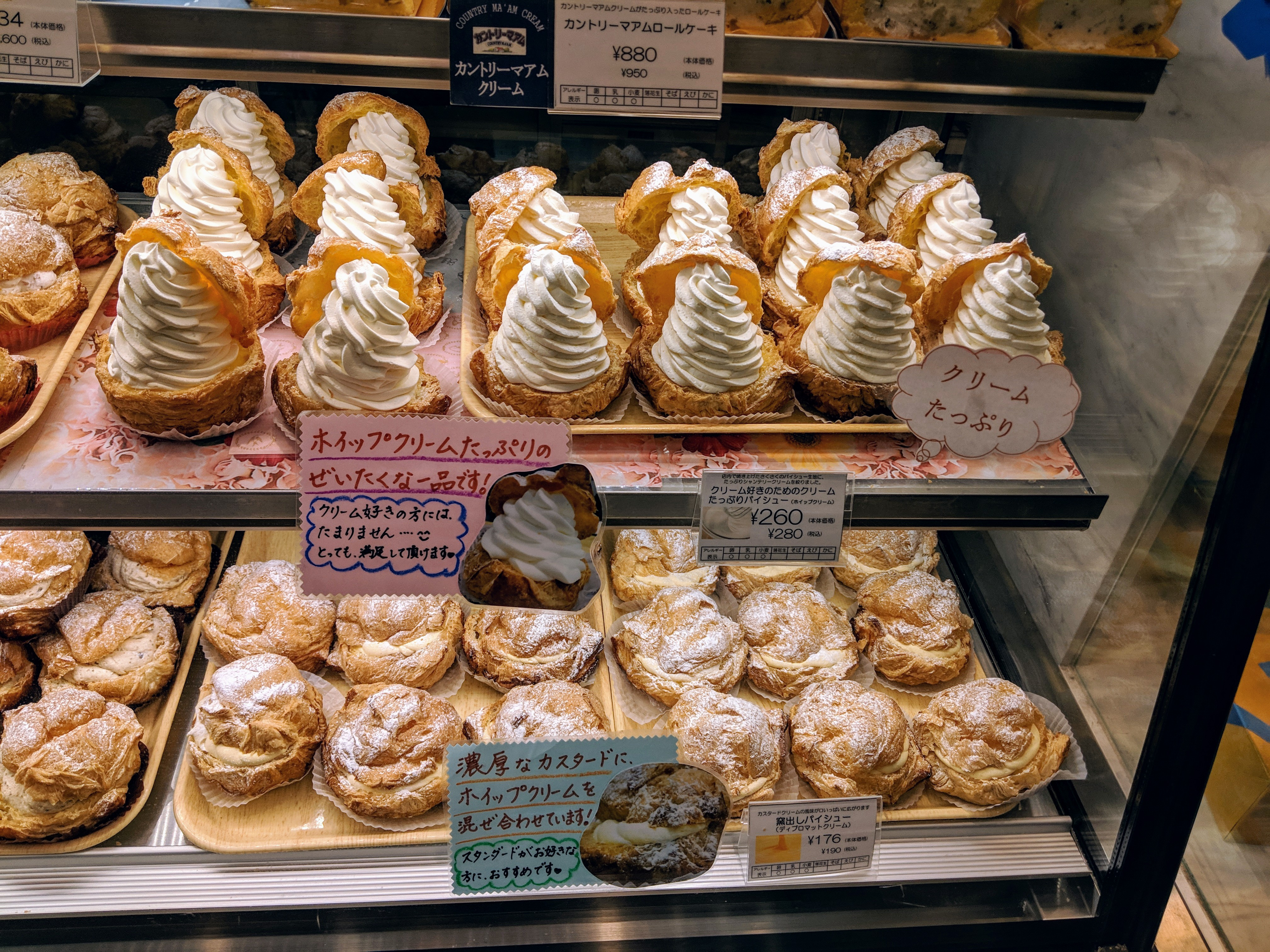

Fujiya's mascot is Peko-chan, a girl in pigtails licking her lips. Peko-chan is a well-known marketing icon in Japan, where life-sized dolls of the mascot are commonly seen nationwide standing outside the chain's stores.

== 2007 ingredients scandal ==
In January 2007, Fujiya was the subject of a scandal when it became known that the company had used expired ingredients in its products, prompting the resignation of its president, Rintaro Fujii.
