= Taichi Takami =

Japanese shogi player

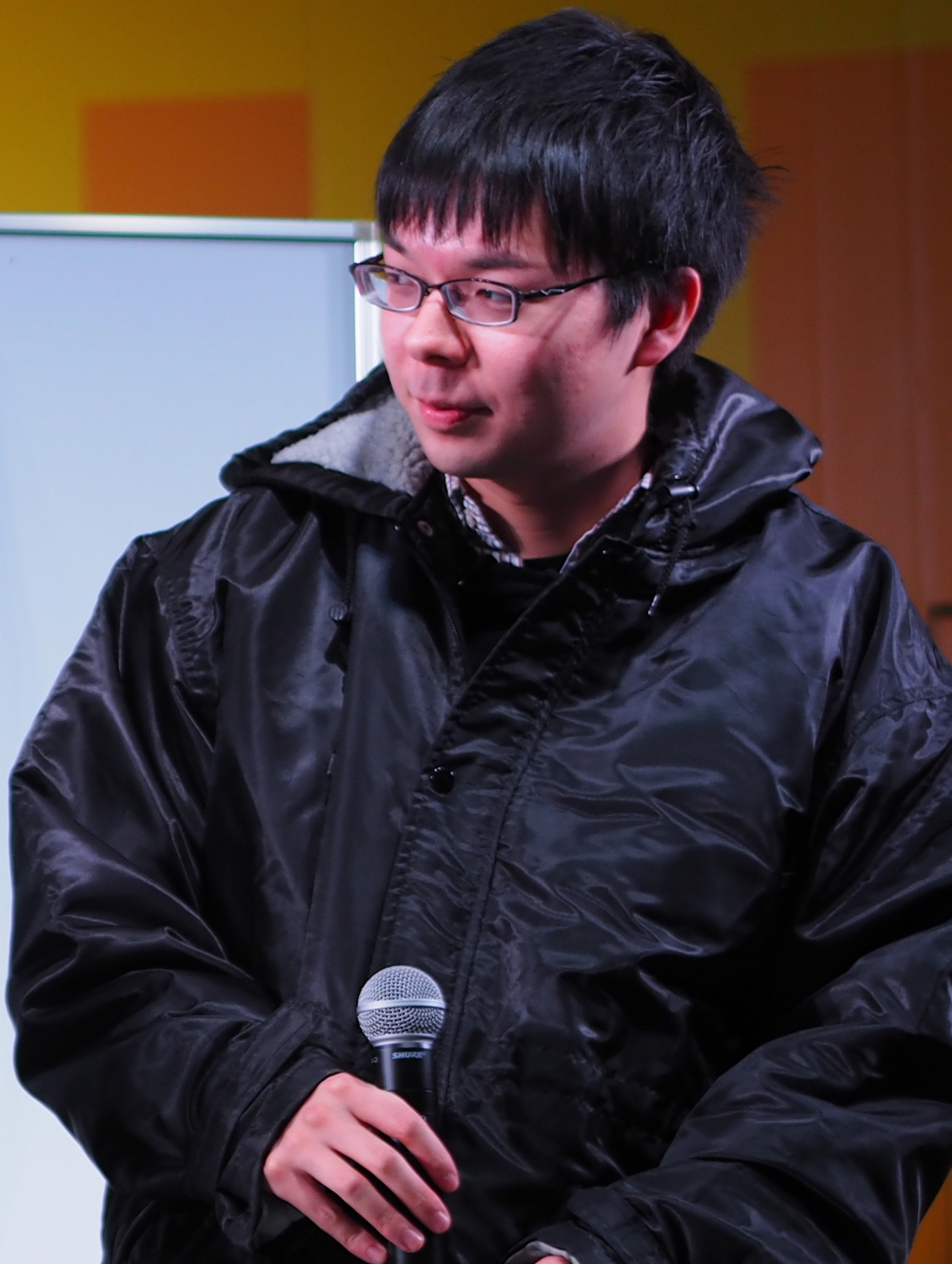
- Native name: 髙見泰地
- Born: July 12, 1993 (age 32)
- Hometown: Yokohama

Career
- Achieved professional status: October 1, 2011 (aged 18)
- Badge number: 284
- Rank: 7-dan
- Teacher: Kazuo Ishida (9-dan)
- Major titles won: 1
- Meijin class: B2
- Ryūō class: 2

Websites
- JSA profile page

Taichi Takami (髙見 泰地, Takami Taichi; born July 12, 1993) is a Japanese professional shogi player ranked 7-dan. He is a former Eiō title holder.

== Early life and apprenticeship ==
Taichi Takami was born in Yokohama on July 12, 1993. He learned shogi from his father when he was in kindergarten, and was later accepted into the Japan Shogi Association's apprentice school at the rank of 6-kyū as a protegee of shogi professional Kazuo Ishida in April 2005.

He was promoted to 1-dan in December 2007 and then to 3-dan in April 2010. He finished the 47th 3-dan League (April 2010 – September 2010) with a record of 9 wins and 9 losses, and the 48th 3-dan League (October 2010 – March 2011) with a record of 12 wins and 6 losses before winning the 49th 3-dan League (April 2011 – September 2011) with a record of 13 wins and 5 losses to obtain full professional status and the rank of 4-dan.

== Shogi professional ==
On May 26, 2018, Takami defeated Kota Kanai to win the 3rd Eiō title 4 games to none. Takami was the first winner of the title since it was upgraded to major title status. As a result of his becoming a major title holder, Takami was promoted to 7-dan the same day.

In May 2019, Takami was unable to defend his Eiō title, losing the 4th Eiō title match to challenger Takuya Nagase 4 games to none.

=== Promotion history ===
The promotion history for Takami is as follows:

- 6-kyū: April 2005
- 3-dan: April 2010
- 4-dan: October 1, 2011
- 5-dan: May 23, 2014
- 6-dan: January 29, 2018
- 7-dan: May 26, 2018

=== Titles and other championships ===
Takami's has appeared in a major title match twice; he won the 3rd Eiō title in 2018, but was unable to defend his title the following year.

=== Year-end prize money and game fee ranking ===
Takami has finished in the "Top 10" of the JSA's year-end prize money/game fee rankings once since turning professional: sixth in 2018 with JPY 26,360,000 in earnings.

== Personal life ==
Takami graduated from Rikkyo University in 2017 with a degree in history.
