= Shintarō Saitō =

Japanese shogi player (born 1993)

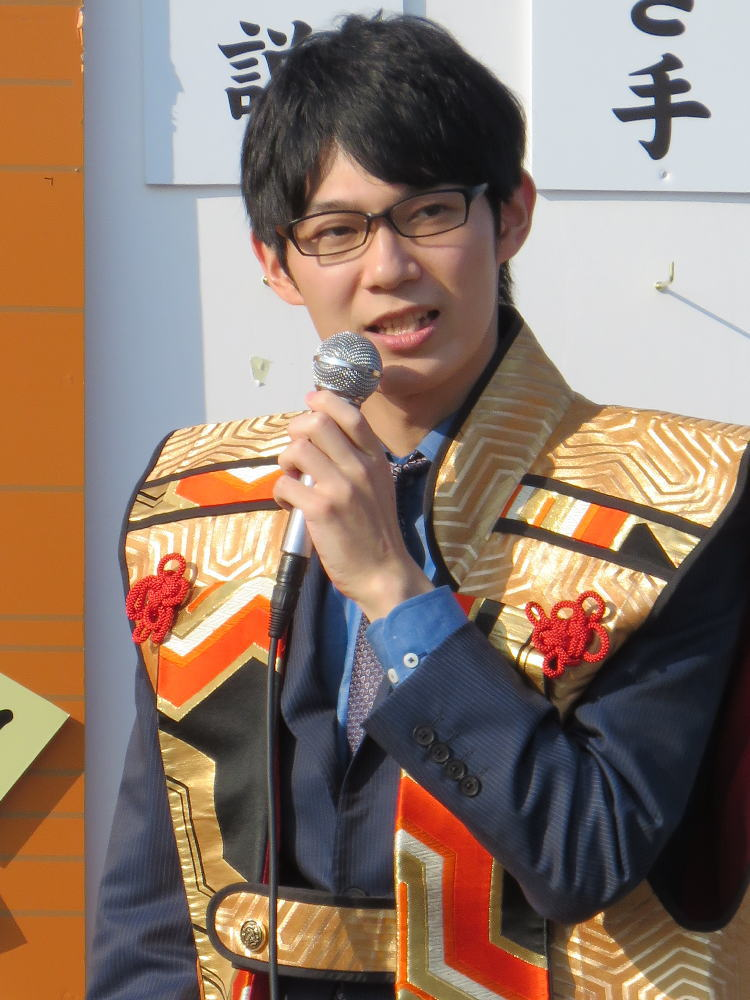
- Saitō at a human shogi event in November 2017.
- Born: April 21, 1993 (age 33)
- Hometown: Nara, Nara
- Nationality: Japanese

Career
- Achieved professional status: April 1, 2012 (aged 18)
- Badge number: 286
- Rank: 8-dan
- Teacher: Mamoru Hatakeyama (8-dan)
- Major titles won: 1
- Meijin class: B1
- Ryūō class: 1

Websites
- JSA profile page

Shintarō Saitō (斎藤 慎太郎, Saitō Shintarō; born April 21, 1993) is a Japanese professional shogi player, ranked 8-dan. He is a former Ōza title holder.

== Early life and apprentice professional ==
Shintarō Saitō was born on April 21, 1993, in Nara. He learned how to play the game from reading books written by Yoshiharu Habu, and as a third-grade elementary school student played his future mentor shogi professional Mamoru Hatakeyama for the first time in an instructional game. As a fourth-grade student, Saitō personally wrote Hatakeyama asking for formal instruction, and formally entered the Japan Shogi Association's apprentice school at the rank of 6-kyū in September 2004 under the latter's guidance.

Saitō steadily progressed as an apprentice professional, reaching 1-dan in November 2006 and entering the 43rd 3-dan League in April 2008; his progress, however, slowed and it took him eight seasons of 3-dan League play before he was able to obtain professional status and the rank of 4-dan by winning the 50th 3-dan League with a record of 15 wins and 3 losses in March 2012.

== Shogi professional ==
Saitō first appearance in a major title match came in June 2017 when he challenged Yoshiharu Habu for 88th Kisei title. Saitō had defeated Tetsurō Itodani the previous April to earn the right to face Habu, but ended up losing the title match 3 games to 1.

In July 2018, Saitō defeated Akira Watanabe to become the challenger for the 66th Ōza title against Taichi Nakamura. The title match against Nakamura took place from September 4 to October 30, 2018. Saitō won the first two games to take the lead, but Nakamura won the next two games to tie the match. Saitō then won Game 5 to win his first major title. Saito's first defense of his Ōza title the following year, however, was unsuccessful, losing the 67th Ōza title match to challenger Takuya Nagase 3 games to none in October 2019.

In April–June 2021, Saitō challenged Watanabe for the latter's Meijin title, but lost the 79th Meijin title match 4 games to 1.

In April–May 2022, Saitō challenged Watanabe again for the Meijin title, but lost the 80th Meijin title match by the same score of 4 games to 1.

Saito challenged Takumi Itō for the Eiō title in the 10th Eiō title match (April–June 2025), but lost the match 3 games to 2. The following year Saitō was also the challenger to Itō in 11th Eiō title match (April–May 2026) but once again lost the match 3 games to 2.

=== Promotion history ===
The promotion history for Saitō is as follows:

- 6-kyū: 2004
- 3-dan: April 2008
- 4-dan: April 1, 2012
- 5-dan: March 5, 2013
- 6-dan: April 23, 2015
- 7-dan: March 8, 2017
- 8-dan: February 13, 2020

=== Titles and other championships ===
Saitō has appeared in seven major title matches to date and has won one major title.

=== Awards and honors ===
Saitō received the Japan Shogi Association Annual Shogi Awards for "Best New Player" and "Best Winning Percentage" in 2015, and "Best Winning Percentage" award in 2016.

=== Year-end prize money and game fee ranking ===
Saitō has finished in the "Top 10" of the JSA's year-end prize money/game fee rankings five times since turning professional: eighth in 2018 with JPY 23,930,000 in earnings; tenth in 2019 with JPY 18,680,000 in earnings; sixth in 2021 with JPY 25,670,000 in earnings; fifth in 2022 with JPY 23,620,000 in earnings; and eighth in 2025 with JPY 17,080,000 in earnings.
