= Takuya Nagase =

Japanese shogi player (born 1992)

- Born: September 5, 1992 (age 33)
- Hometown: Yokohama, Japan

Career
- Achieved professional status: October 1, 2009 (aged 17)
- Badge number: 276
- Rank: 9-dan
- Teacher: Terutaka Yasue
- Major titles won: 5
- Tournaments won: 3
- Meijin class: A
- Ryūō class: 2

Websites
- JSA profile page

Takuya Nagase (永瀬 拓矢, Nagase Takuya; born September 5, 1992) is a Japanese professional shogi player ranked 9-dan. He is a former holder of the Eiō and Ōza titles.

== Early life and apprentice shogi professional ==
Nagase was born in Yokohama on September 5, 1992. He learned how to play shogi at age six from his grandfather, and entered the Japan Shogi Association's apprentice school in 2004 at the rank of 6-kyū under the guidance of shogi professional Terutaka Yasue. He was promoted to 1-dan in 2007 and participated in the 3-dan League for the first time in April 2008, finishing with a record of 13 wins and 5 losses.

Nagase obtained professional status and the rank of 4-dan on October 1, 2009, after winning the 45th 3-dan League (April –September 2009) with a record of 14 wins and 4 losses.

== Shogi professional ==
In October 2012, Nagase won his first tournament since turning professional when he defeated Shingo Itō 2 games to none to win the 2nd Kakogawa Seiryū Tournament, and followed that up by defeating Tetsuya Fujimori a few days later to win the 43rd Shinjin-Ō by the score of 2 games to 1.

Nagase's first appearance in a major title match came in June 2016 when he challenged Yoshiharu Habu for the 87th Kisei title. Nagase defeated Yasuaki Murayama in the challenger tournament final to advance to the title match against Habu, and was actually leading the best-of-five match 2 games to 1 before losing the final two games.

In December 2017, Nagase defeated Reo Kurosawa in the 43rd Kiō challenger match to earn the right to challenge Akira Watanabe for the title. Nagase, however, was unable to capture his first major title, losing the match to Wantabe 3 games to 2 in March 2018.

In February 2019, Nagase defeated Tatsuya Sugai 2 games to 1 in the challenger playoff round for the 4th Eiō tournament to earn the right to challenge Taichi Takami for the title. In the April–May 2019 title match, Nagase defeated Takami 4 games to none to win his first major title.

In July 2019, Nagase defeated the reigning Mejin Masayuki Toyoshima in the final of the challenger tournament for the 67th Ōza title to earn the right to challenge the defending Ōza Shintarō Saitō. On October 1, 2019, Nagase won Game 3 of the 67th Ōza title match to complete a three game swept of Saitō. The win not only gave Nagase his first Ōza title and made him a 2-crown major title holder for the first time, but also meant he satisfied the promotion criteria for the rank of 8-dan.

Nagase was unable to defend his Eiō title in 2020, losing the 5th Eiō title match to challenger Masayuki Toyoshima on September 21, 2020, 4 games to 3. The two players actually needed nine games to determine the best-of-seven match because two of the games ended in impasse.

Nagase successfully defended his Ōza title in October 2020 by defeating Toshiaki Kubo in the 68th Ōza title match 3 games to 2. The win also meant that Nagase satisfied the criteria for promotion to 9-dan.

Nagase challenged the reigning Ōshō Akira Watanabe for the 70th Ōshō title in January to March 2021, but lost the match 4 games to 2.

In September–October 2021, Nagase successfully defended his Ōza title by defeating Kazuki Kimura 3 games to 1.

In June–July 2022, Nagase challenged Sōta Fujii for the 93rd Kisei title, but lost the match 3 games to 1. Later that same year, Nagase successfully defended his Ōza title by defeating Toyoshima 3 games to 1 in the 70th Ōza match (August–October 2022).

In October 2023, Nagase was defeated by Fujii in the 71st Ōza title match (August–October 2023), losing 3 games to 1.

In February 2024, Nagase and Fujii met yet again, this time in the championship game of the 17th Asahi Cup Open, with Nagase coming out victorious to win the tournament for the first time.

In September 2024, Nagase challenged Fujii in 72nd Ōza title match in a rematch of the previous year, but Nagase lost the match 3 games to none.

In January–March 2025, Nagase challenged Fujii for the 74th Ōshō title, but lost the match 4 games to 1. Nagase and Fujii met once again in 83rd Meijin title match (April–May 2025), with Fujii defending his Meijin crown by a score of 4 games to 1. Nagase and Fujii met in a major title match for a third time in 2025, with Nagase challenging Fujii for the Ōi Title, but lost the 66th Ōi Title Match (July–September 2025) 4 games to 2.

In January 2026, Nagase challenged Fujji for Ōshō title yet again and was actually leading the 75th Ōshō Title Match (January–March 2026) 3 games to 1 before Fujii came back to win the final three games and defend his title.

=== Promotion history ===
Nagase's promotion history is as follows:

- 6-kyū: September 29, 2004
- 4-dan: October 1, 2009
- 5-dan: April 24, 2012
- 6-dan: June 17, 2013
- 7-dan: November 22, 2017
- 8-dan: October 1, 2019
- 9-dan: October 14, 2020

=== Titles and other championships ===
Nagase has appeared in a major title match seventeen times and has won five titles; in addition, he has won three non-major-title championships during his career.

=== Awards and honors ===
Nagase received the JSA's Annual Shogi Awards for "Most Consecutive Games Won" for the April 2011 – March 2012 shogi year; "Best New Player", "Best Winning Percentage" and "Most Consecutive Games Won" for the April 2012 – March 2013 shogi year; "Fighting Spirit”and“Most Consecutive Games Won”for the April 2019 – March 2020 shogi year; and "Fighting Spirit" for the April 2024 – March 2025 shogi year.

=== Year-end prize money and game fee ranking ===
Nagase has finished in the "Top 10" of the JSA's year-end prize money and game fee rankings seven times since turning professional: fourth place with JPY 46,780,000 in earnings for 2019; third place with JPY 46,210,000 in earnings for 2020; fourth place with JPY 46,680,000 in earnings for 2021; fourth place with JPY 48,210,000 in earnings for 2022; third place with JPY 35,090,000 in earnings for 2023; third place with JPY 30,260,000 in earnings for 2024; and second place with JPY 45,770,000 in earnings for 2025.
