= Takahiro Toyokawa =

Japanese shogi player

- Native name: 豊川孝弘
- Born: February 20, 1967 (age 58)
- Hometown: Suginami

Career
- Achieved professional status: October 1, 1991 (aged 24)
- Badge Number: 200
- Rank: 7-dan
- Teacher: Kiyosaku Sekiya (8-dan)
- Meijin class: Free
- Ryūō class: 6
- Notable students: Kazushi Watanabe

Websites
- JSA profile page

Takahiro Toyokawa (豊川 孝弘, Toyokawa Takahiro; born February 20, 1967) is a Japanese professional shogi player ranked 7-dan.

== Early life and apprenticeship ==
Toyokawa was born in Suginami, Tokyo on February 20, 1967. In December 1982, he entered the Japan Shogi Association's apprentice school at the rank 6-kyū under the guidance of shogi professional Kiyosaku Sekiya. He was promoted to the rank of 1-dan in 1985, and obtained full professional status and the rank of 4-dan in October 1991.

== Shogi professional ==
=== Promotion history ===
Toyokawa's promotion history is as follows:

- 6-kyū: 1982
- 1-dan: 1985
- 4-dan: October 1, 1991
- 5-dan: February 27, 1996
- 6-dan: May 22, 2002
- 7-dan: March 19, 2009
