= Akira Watanabe (shogi) =

Japanese shogi player (born 1984)

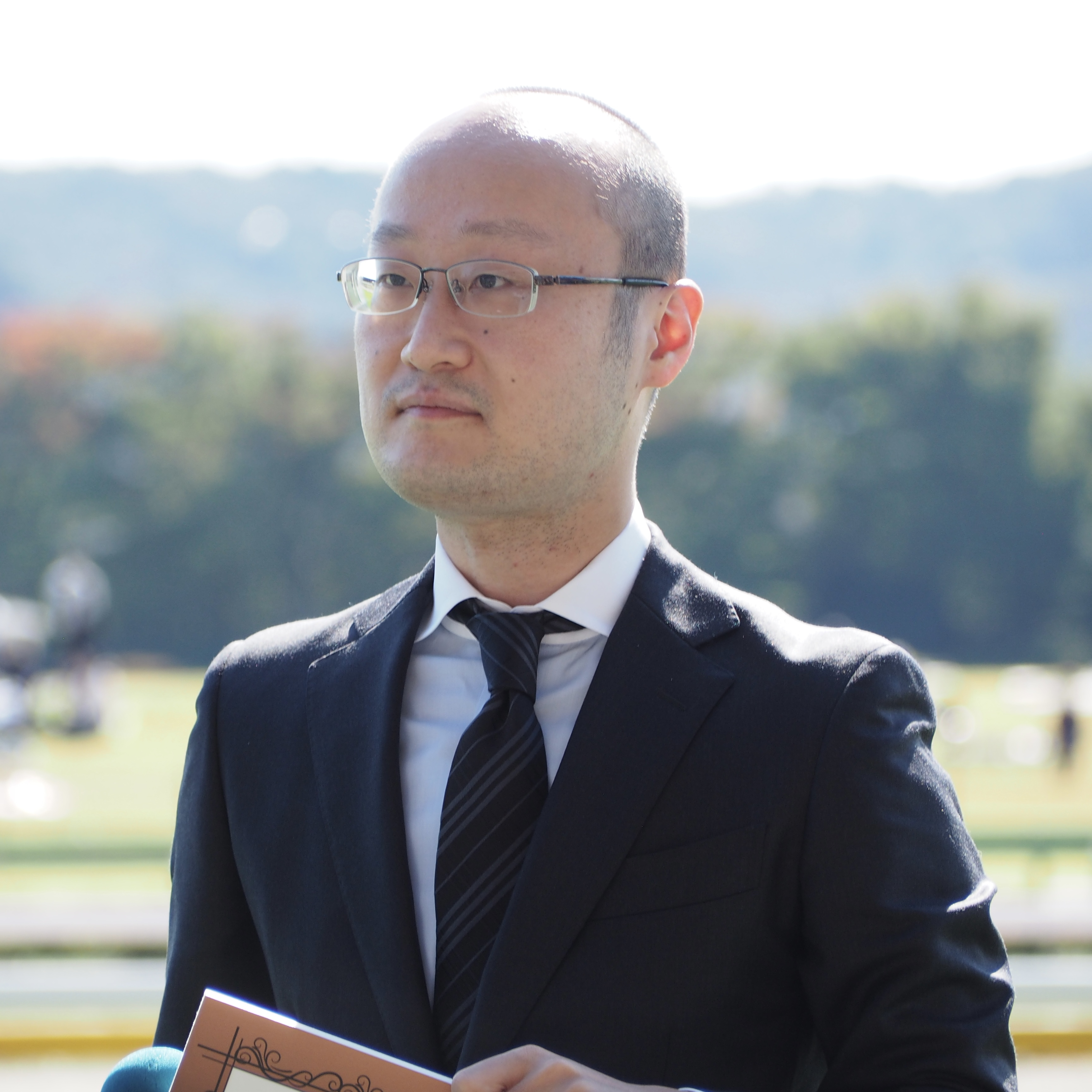
- Watanabe in 2022
- Native name: 渡辺明
- Born: April 23, 1984 (age 42)
- Hometown: Katsushika

Career
- Achieved professional status: April 1, 2000 (aged 15)
- Badge number: 235
- Rank: 9-dan
- Teacher: Kazuharu Shoshi (7-dan)
- Lifetime titles: Lifetime Ryūō; Lifetime Kiō
- Major titles won: 31
- Tournaments won: 12
- Meijin class: B1
- Ryūō class: 1

Websites
- JSA profile page
- Official website

Akira Watanabe (渡辺 明, Watanabe Akira; born April 23, 1984) is a Japanese professional shogi player ranked 9-dan. He is a former holder of the Meijin, Kisei, Ōshō, Ōza, Kiō and Ryūō titles. He is also a Lifetime Kiō and a Lifetime Ryūō title holder.

== Early life, amateur shogi and apprentice professional ==
Watanabe was born on April 23, 1984, in Katsushika, Tokyo. He learned how to play shogi from his father, who was an amateur 5-dan ranked player. He won the Elementary School Student Meijin Tournament in 1994 as a fourth-grade student at Hokizuka Elementary School. He was the first fourth-grade winner in the history of the tournament.

That same year Watanabe took the entrance exam for the Japan Shogi Association's apprentice school. Part of his test was a game against future women's professional Sayuri Takebe, who was member of the apprentice school at the time. The entire game was played at an extremely fast pace, with Watanabe winning in less than two minutes. Watanabe passed the entrance exam and entered the apprentice school as a 6-kyū protegee of shogi professional Kazuharu Shoshi.

Watanabe was promoted to the rank of professional 4-dan on April 1, 2000, at the age of 15 after winning the 26th 3-dan league (October 1999 to March 2000) with a record of 13 wins and 5 losses, thus becoming the fourth junior high school student after Hifumi Katō, Kōji Tanigawa and Yoshiharu Habu to become a shogi professional.

== Shogi professional ==
Watanabe made his first appearance in a major title match in October 2003 when he challenged Habu for the Ōza title. Watanabe led the match 2 games to 1 before Habu won the last two games to defend his title. Even though he lost the match, Watanabe was called "The man who made Habu shake" (羽生を震えさせた男, habu wo furuesaseta otoko) because Habu's hand visibly shook when making the winning move during the deciding fifth game.

In December 2004, Watanabe won his first major title when he defeated the defending Ryūō title holder Toshiyuki Moriuchi 4 games to 3. Moriuchi was also the reigning Meijin and Ōshō title holder at the time. Watanabe was 20 years 8 months old at the time, thus making him the third youngest major title holder ever.

In 2005, Watanabe defended his Ryūō title for the first time when he defeated challenger Kazuki Kimura 4 games to 0. As a result, Watanabe became the youngest person ever to be promoted to the rank of 9-dan at the age of twenty-one years and seven months.

In March 2007, Watanabe defeated computer shogi program Bonanza to win the first JSA-sanctioned game between a computer shogi program and a top shogi professional. Bonanza was the reigning World Computer Shogi Champion, while Watanabe was the reigning Ryūō title holder.

Watanabe became the first person to qualify for the Lifetime Ryūō title in December 2008 after winning the title for the fifth consecutive time. He defeated Habu (the reigning Meijin, Ōza, Ōshō, and Kisei title holder) 4 games to 3 to win the 21st Ryūō title match. Habu won the first three games, but Watanabe came back to win the final four to defend his title, and become the first player ever to win a 7-game major title match after losing the first three games. The match was billed as the "Winner Becomes the First Lifetime Ryūō Match" because a win by Habu would have been his seventh Ryūō title overall, thus making him the first Lifetime Ryūō.

In 2011, Watanabe challenged Toshiaki Kubo for the 36th Kiō title, but lost the match 3 games to 1. Two years later in 2013, Watanabe challenged Masataka Gōda for the 38th Kio title. Watanabe defeated Gōda to not only win his first Kiō title, but also to become only the eighth player in history to become a "3-crown": a player who simultaneously holds three major titles. Watanabe successfully defended his Kiō title in 2014 against Hiroyuki Miura, in 2015 against Habu, in 2016 against Amahiko Satō and in 2017 against Shōta Chida. Watanabe's victory over Chida was his fifth consecutive over all, making him only the second player ever to qualify for the Lifetime Kiō title.

In 2012–2013, Watanabe won the 62nd Ōshō Challenger League tournament with a record of 6 wins and 0 losses to advance to the title match against Yasumitsu Satō. In the title match, Watanabe defeated Satō 4 games to 1 to win the Ōshō title for the first time. The following year, Watanabe faced challenger Habu in the 63rd Ōshō title match, and successfully defended his title by the score of 4 games to 3. Watanabe, however, was unable to defend his title for a second consecutive year when he lost the 64th Ōshō title in seven games to challenger Gōda.

In November 2018, Watanabe defeated Tatsuya Sugai to win the 39th JT Nihon Series. It was Watanabe's second time winning the tournament: he won the 35th JT Nihon Series in 2014. The following month he defeated Tetsurō Itodani in single game playoff to earn the right to challenge Kubo for the 68th Ōshō title. Although Watanabe, Itodani and Akihito Hirose all finished the 68th Ōshō Challenger League tournament with records of 4 wins and 2 losses, only the two highest seeded players advance to a playoff per tournament rules in the event of a tie. In January 2019, Watanabe became the 55th shogi professional to reach 600 career wins, and in February 2019, he recaptured the Ōshō title for the 3rd time overall and the first time in five years by defeating defending champion Kubo 4 games to none.

In June – July 2019, Watanabe was the challenger to Masayuki Toyoshima in the 90th Kisei title match. Toyoshima won the first game of the match, but Watanabe came back to win the next three games and capture the Kisei title for the first time. With the victory, Watanabe returned to being a 3-crown title holder.

In November 2019, Watanabe defeated Hirose in the finals of the 40th JT Nihon Series to repeat as tournament champion and win the tournament's five million Japanese yen first prize.

Watanabe successfully defended his Kiō title in January–March 2020 by defeating Kei Honda 3 games to 1 to win the 45th Kiō title match.

In January – March 2020, Watanabe and Hirose met once again in the 69th Ōshō title match. Watanabe was trailing 3 games to 2 after five games, but won the next two games to defend his Ōshō title.

In June – July 2020, Watanabe defended his Kisei title against Sōta Fujii, but lost the match 3 games to 1. In June – August 2020, Watanabe successfully challenged for the 78th Meijin title, defeating defending Meijin title holder Toyoshima 4 games to 2 to win the Meijin title for the first time.

Watanabe successfully defended his Ōshō title on March 14, 2021, by defeating challenger Takuya Nagase 4 games to 2 to win the 70th Ōshō title. A few days later on March 17, Watanabe successfully defended his Kiō title by defeating challenger Itodani 3 games to 1 to win the 46th Kiō title. The victory over Itodani gave Watanable his 28th major title overall and moved him into sole 4th place on list of all-time major title winners. In April–June 2021, Watanabe successfully defended his Meijin title by defeating challenger Shintarō Saitō 4 games to 1 in the 79th Meijin title match.

In June – July 2021, Watanabe and Fujii met for the second consecutive year in Kisei title, with Watababe being the challenger this time. Watanabe's challenge was unsuccessful and he lost the match 3 games to none. The defeat also was the first time in a major titles match that Watanabe was unable to win a single game.

Watanabe and Fujii began the year 2022 by facing each other yet again in the 71st Ōshō title match (January – February 2022), but Fujii won the match 4 games to none to take Watanabe's Ōshō title. Watanabe was more successful in defending his Kiō title and defeated challenger Nagase 3 games to 1 to win the 47th Kiō title match in March 2022. In April–May 2022, Watanabe won his third consecutive Meijin title by defeating challenger Saitō 4 games to 1 for the second year in a row in the 80th Meijin title match.

Watanabe faced Fujii in the 48th Kiō title match (February–March 2023), but was unable to win the title for the eleventh consecutive time, losing the match 3 games to 1. The two faced each other in the 81st Meijin title match (April–June 2023) and once again Watanabe was unable to defend his title, losing his Meijin title to Fujii 4 games to 1.

In July 2024, Watanabe once again met Fujii in a major title match: this time as the challenger for the 65th Ōi title (July – August 2024); however, he lost the match 4 games to 1.

Watanabe and Hirose met in the finals of the JT Nihon Series for the second time in five years, and once again Watanabe came out on top to win the 45th JT Nihon Series tournament.

=== Promotion history ===
The promotion history for Watanabe is as follows:

- 6-kyū: 1994
- 1-dan: 1997
- 4-dan: April 1, 2000
- 5-dan: April 1, 2003
- 6-dan: October 1, 2004
- 7-dan: October 1, 2005
- 8-dan: November 17, 2005
- 9-dan: November 30, 2005

=== Titles and other championships ===
Watanabe has appeared in major title matches a total of 45 times and has won 31 major titles. He has won the Ryūō title eleven times and the Kiō ten times, thus qualifying for the Lifetime Ryūō and Lifetime Kiō titles. He has also won the Ōshō five times, the Meijin title three times, and the Ōza and Kisei titles once each. In addition to major titles, Watanabe has won 12 other shogi championships during his career.

==== Major titles ====
Title	Years	Number of times overall
Ryūō	2004–12, 2015–16	11
Meijin	2020–22	3
Kiō	2012–21	10
Ōshō	2012–13, 2018–20	5
Ōza	2011	1
Kisei	2019	1

==== Other championships ====
Tournament	Years	Number of times
Ginga-sen	2005, 2007, 2011, 2014	4
NHK Cup	2012	1
^{*}Daiwa Securities Strongest Player Cup	2008	1
Asahi Cup Open	2012	1
JT Nihon Series	2014, 2018–19, 2024	4
Shinjin-Oh	2005	1

Note: Tournaments marked with an asterisk (*) are no longer held.

=== Awards and honors ===
Watanabe has received a number of Japan Shogi Association Annual Shogi Awards throughout his career. He has received the "Best New Player" award (2002), the "Player of the Year" award (2012 and 2019), the "Excellent Player" award (2005, 2008, 2010–11, 2015, 2018, 2020, 2022 and 2023), the "Game of the Year" award (2008, 2011–12, 2015, 2018 and 2020), the "Fighting-spirit" award (2003 and 2006), the "Most Games Won" award (2005), the "Most Games Played" award (2010), The "Most Consecutive Games Won" award (2019) and the "Distinguished Service" award (2004).

=== Year-end prize money and game fee ranking ===
Watanabe has finished in the "Top 10" of the JSA's year-end prize money and game fee rankings each year since 2004, and in the "Top 3" eighteen of those times. He was the top money winner in 2013, 2017 and 2021.

Year	Amount	Rank
2004	¥24,420,000	6th
2005	¥61,940,000	3rd
2006	¥56,540,000	4th
2007	¥80,320,000	2nd
2008	¥62,520,000	2nd
2009	¥56,050,000	2nd
2010	¥62,400,000	2nd
2011	¥83,650,000	2nd
2012	¥71,970,000	2nd
2013	¥102,550,000	1st
2014	¥66,840,000	3rd
2015	¥45,770,000	3rd
2016	¥73,900,000	2nd
2017	¥75,340,000	1st
2018	¥51,190,000	3rd
2019	¥65,140,000	3rd
2020	¥80,430,000	2nd
2021	¥81,940,000	1st
2022	¥70,630,000	2nd
2023	¥45,620,000	2nd
2024	¥25,940,000	5th

== Personal life ==
In May 2004, Watanabe married Megumi Ina and the couple's eldest was born during the summer that same year. Ina is the younger sister of shogi professional Yūsuke Ina and is also a comic book author. The couple met when Ina was an apprentice female shogi professional and became friends due to their shared interest in tsumeshogi.

Watanabe is a fan of horse racing as well as professional soccer, even traveling to overseas venues to attend games. He obtained a Class 4 soccer referee license because of his son's interest the game and has served as head referee at some elementary school games. Watanabe also started the Japan Shogi Association's futsal club.
