= Michiyoshi Yamada =

- Native name: 山田道美
- Born: December 11, 1933
- Hometown: Nagoya
- Nationality: Japanese
- Died: June 18, 1970 (aged 36)

Career
- Achieved professional status: 1951 (aged approximately 18)
- Rank: 9 dan
- Teacher: Kingorō Kaneko
- Major titles won: 2
- Tournaments won: 9

Michiyoshi Yamada (山田 道美, yamada michiyoshi; December 11, 1933 – June 18, 1970) was a Japanese professional shogi player who achieved the rank of 8-dan and was awarded the rank of 9-dan after his death.

== Early life ==
Yamada was born on December 11, 1933, in Nagoya, Aichi.

== Shogi professional ==
Yamada died at the young age of 36 when he was still competing in the top A class of the Meijin ranking tournament system (順位戦 jun'isen), which is generally indicative of a strong player. He had been in the A class for six years and died during his seventh year.

He was a professional player for nineteen years.

He influenced modern shogi players in his pioneering use of game databases, holding research study groups, and leading a serious ascetic lifestyle.

== Promotion history ==
Kanai's promotion history is as follows:

- 1949: entered as an apprentice
- 1951: 4-dan
- 1964: 8-dan
- 1970, June 18: 9-dan (awarded posthumously)

== Titles and other championships ==
Yamada won the Kisei title twice – both in 1967 when he defeated Yasuharu Ōyama and Makoto Nakahara, respectively, in the first and second tournament of that year. Besides these two wins, Yamada was a competitor in four other title matches (for a total of 6 title match appearances). He was unable to defend his Kisei title in 1968 losing to Nakahara and again challenged for the Kisei in 1969 also losing to Nakahara. He was a challenger for the Meijin and Ōshō titles both against Ōyama in 1965.

He won a total of 9 non-title tournaments during his career.
