= Shingo Hirafuji =

Japanese Shogi player

- Native name: 平藤眞吾
- Born: October 15, 1963 (age 62)
- Hometown: Toyonaka, Osaka

Career
- Achieved professional status: April 1, 1991 (aged 27)
- Badge number: 199
- Rank: 7-dan
- Teacher: Shōzō Kashū (7-dan)
- Meijin class: C2
- Ryūō class: 6

Websites
- JSA profile page

Shingo Hirafuji (平藤 眞吾, Hirafuji Shingo; born October 15, 1963) is a Japanese professional shogi player ranked 7-dan.

== Early life and apprenticeship ==
Hirafuji was born in Toyonaka, Osaka on October 15, 1963. He entered the Japan Shogi Association's apprentice school as student of shogi professional Shōzō Kashū in 1980. He was promoted to 1-dan in 1983 and obtained full professional status and the rank of 4-dan in April 1991.

== Shogi professional ==
=== Playing style ===
Hirafuji is considered an all-around player who is adept at many different Static Rook and Ranging Rook strategies.

=== Promotion history ===
Hirafuji's promotion history is as follows:

- 6-kyū: 1980
- 1-dan: 1983
- 4-dan: April 1, 1991
- 5-dan: March 1, 1996
- 6-dan: November 5, 2002
- 7-dan: October 25, 2011
