= Hirotaka Kajiura =

Japanese shogi player

- Native name: 梶浦宏孝
- Born: July 6, 1995 (age 30)
- Hometown: Shinjuku

Career
- Achieved professional status: April 1, 2015 (aged 19)
- Badge Number: 301
- Rank: 7-dan
- Teacher: Daisuke Suzuki (9-dan)
- Meijin class: C2
- Ryūō class: 3

Websites
- JSA profile page

Hirotaka Kajiura (梶浦 宏孝, Kajiura Hirotaka; born July 6, 1995) is a Japanese professional shogi player ranked 7-dan.

== Early life and apprenticeship ==
Kajiura was born in the Shinjuku, Tokyo on July 6, 1995. He learned how to play shogi from his father when he was about five years old, and eventually entered the Japan Shogi Association's apprentice school at the rank of 6-kyū under the tutelage of shogi professional Daisuke Suzuki in 2008. He was promoted to the rank of 3-dan in 2012 and then obtained full professional status and the rank of 4-dan after finishing in second place in the 56th 3-dan League with a record of 13 wins and 5 losses.

== Shogi professional ==
=== Promotion history ===
The promotion history for Kajiura is as follows.

- 6-kyū: April 2008
- 3-dan: October 2012
- 4-dan: April 1, 2015
- 5-dan: July 25, 2019
- 6-dan: June 4, 2020
- 7-dan: May 6, 2021
