= Kōta Kanai =

Japanese Shogi player

- Native name: 金井恒太
- Born: May 25, 1986 (age 40)
- Hometown: Ageo, Saitama

Career
- Achieved professional status: April 1, 2007 (aged 20)
- Badge number: 265
- Rank: 7-dan
- Teacher: Kenji Iino (8-dan)
- Meijin class: C2
- Ryūō class: 4

Websites
- JSA profile page

Kōta Kanai (金井 恒太, Kanai Kōta; born May 25, 1986) is a Japanese professional shogi player ranked 7-dan.

== Early life and apprenticeship ==
Kanai was born on May 25, 1986, in Ageo, Saitama. He learned how to play shogi from his grandfather when he was about six years old. In August 1999, he was accepted into the Japan Shogi Association's apprentice school at the rank of 6-kyū under the guidance of shogi professional Kenji Iino. He was promoted to the rank of 3-dan in 2003, and obtained full professional status and the rank of 4-dan in April 2007 after the tying for first place with Masayuki Toyoshima in the 40th 3-dan League (October 2006 – March 2007) with a record of 14 wins and 4 losses. Kanai had a record of three wins and four losses after seven games in the 40th 3-dan League before winning his next eleven games to gain professional status.

== Shogi professional ==
Kanai advanced to the title match of the 3rd Eiō tournament in 2018, but lost the match to Taichi Takami 4 games to none.

=== Promotion history ===
Kanai's promotion history is as follows:

- 6-kyū: 1999
- 4-dan: April 1, 2007
- 5-dan: March 9, 2010
- 6-dan: March 9, 2016
- 7-dan: October 14, 2026

=== Titles and other championships ===
Kana has appeared in one major title match since turning professional.

=== Awards and honors ===
Kanai received the Japan Shogi Association's Annual Shogi Awards "Most Consecutive Games Won" for 2008 and "Special Game of the Year" for 2009.
