= Takayuki Yamasaki =

Japanese shogi player

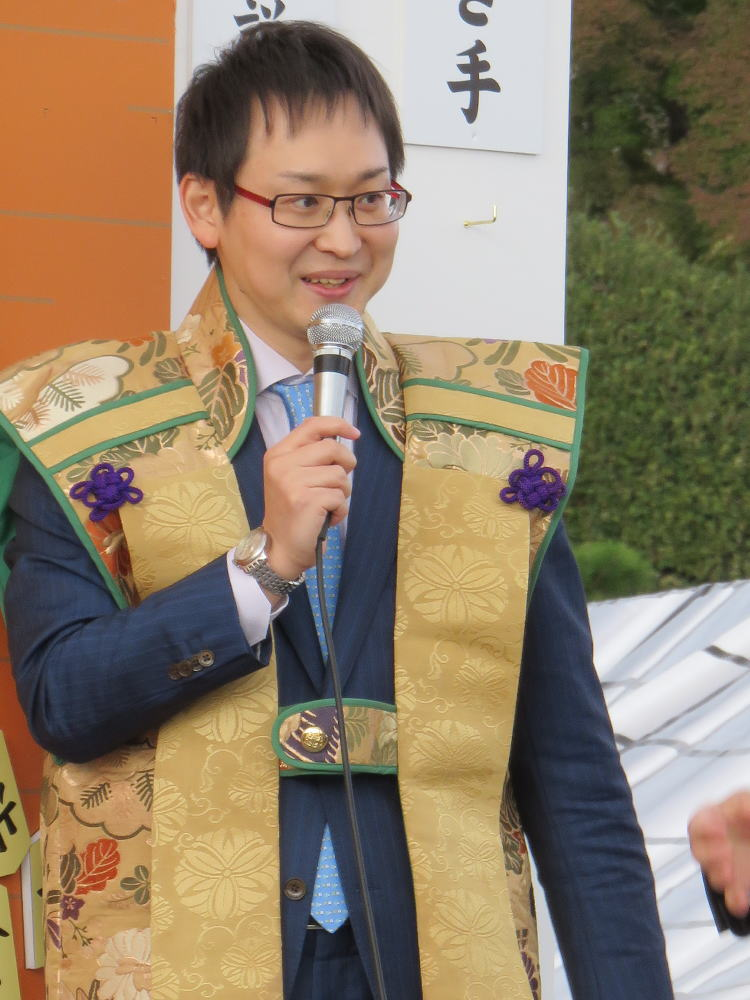
- Yamasaki at a human shogi event in November 2017.
- Native name: 山崎隆之
- Born: February 14, 1981 (age 45)
- Hometown: Hiroshima

Career
- Achieved professional status: April 1, 1998 (aged 17)
- Badge number: 227
- Rank: 9-dan
- Teacher: Nobuo Mori (7-dan)
- Tournaments won: 8
- Meijin class: B1
- Ryūō class: 1
- Notable students: Yui Isoya

Websites
- JSA profile page
- Official website

Takayuki Yamasaki (山崎 隆之, Yamasaki Takayuki; born February 14, 1981) is a Japanese professional shogi player ranked 9-dan.

== Early life and apprenticeship ==
Yamasaki was born in Hiroshima, Japan on February 14, 1981. He entered the Japan Shogi Association's apprentice school in 1992 at the rank 6-kyū as a student of shogi professional Nobuo Mori. He was promoted to 1-dan in 1994 and obtained full professional status and the rank of 4-dan in April 1998 after finishing second in the 22nd 3-dan League (October 1997 – March 1998) with a record of 12 wins and 6 losses.

== Shogi professional ==
Yamasaki became the 56th shogi professional to reach 600 career wins on April 12, 2019.

=== Promotion history ===
The promotion history for Yamasaki is as follows:

- 6-kyū: 1992
- 1-dan: 1994
- 4-dan: April 1, 1998
- 5-dan: August 28, 2001
- 6-dan: November 18, 2004
- 7-dan: August 10, 2006
- 8-dan: July 27, 2013
- 9-dan: February 6, 2025

=== Titles and other championships ===
Yamasaki has been the challenger for a major title twice, but lost both times; he has, however, won eight non-major-title championships during his career.

==== Other championships ====
Tournament	Years	Number of times
Shinjin-ō	2000, 2004	2
^{*}Quick Play Young Professionals Tournament	2002	1
NHK Cup	2004, 2017	2
^{*}Daiwa Securities Strongest Player Cup	2009	1
Eiō (Note: The Eiō-sen was upgraded to major title status after the 2016 tournament)	2015	1
JT Nihon Series	2017	1

Note: Tournaments marked with an asterisk (*) are no longer held.

=== Awards and honors ===
Yamasaki has received a number of Japan Shogi Association Annual Shogi Awards throughout his career. He won the ""Best New Player" Award for 1999–2000, the "Best Winning Percentage" and "Most Consecutive Games Won" awards for 2001–2002, the "Most Consecutive Games Won" award for 2002–2003, the "Fighting-spirit" award for 2003–2004, and the Kōzō Masuda Award for 2010–2011. He also received the association's "Shogi Honor Award" in April 2019 in recognition of winning 600 official games as a professional.

=== Year-end prize money and game fee ranking ===
Yamasaki has finished in the "Top 10" of the JSA's year-end prize money and game fee rankings six times since turning professional: seventh in 2005 with JPY 22,990,000 in earnings; tenth in 2009 with JPY 22,710,000 in earnings; tenth in 2012 with JPY 16,430,000 in earnings; fifth in 2016 with JPY 32,060,000 in earnings; ninth in 2022 with JPY 17,700,000 in earnings; and eight in 2024 with JPY 21,240,000 in earnings.
