= Annual Shogi Awards =

- Awarded for: Achievements of professional or amateur shogi players of the previous shogi calendar year
- Presented by: Japan Shogi Association
- First award: 1974; 52 years ago
- Website: https://www.shogi.or.jp/player/winner.html

The Annual Shogi Awards (将棋大賞 shōgi taishō) are a number of prizes awarded yearly by the Japan Shogi Association to professional and amateur shogi players who have achieved particular success. The first Annual Shogi Awards were presented in 1974.

== Winners ==
=== Regular professionals ===
Regular professionals are those granted regular professional (棋士, kishi) status by the Japan Shogi Association.

==== Overall performance ====
- Note: The numbers in parenthesis indicate the number of times a player has won the award.

No.	Shogi year	Player of the Year	Special Award	Excellent Player (Note: The "Excellent Player Award" was established for the 33rd Annual Shogi Awards (April 2005 – March 2006) as a replacement for the "Special Achievement Award" and "Techinique Award" given out up to and including the 32nd Annual Shogi Awards.)	Fighting Spirit	Best New Player
53	April 2025 – March 2026	Sōta Fujii (6)	—	Takumi Itō (3)	Takuya Nagase (2)	Ryūma Yoshiike
52	April 2024 – March 2025	Sōta Fujii (5)	—	Takumi Itō (2)	Takuya Nagase (2)	Reo Okabe
51	April 2023 – March 2024	Sōta Fujii (4)	—	Takumi Itō	Tadahisa Maruyama	Nagisa Fujimoto
50	April 2022 – March 2023	Sōta Fujii (3)	—	Akira Watanabe (9)	Yoshiharu Habu (3)	Shin'ichirō Hattori
49	April 2021 – March 2022	Sōta Fujii (2)	—	Akira Watanabe (8)	Tatsuya Sugai	Takumi Itō
48	April 2020 – March 2021	Sōta Fujii	—	Akira Watanabe (7)	Masayuki Toyoshima (2)	Takashi Ikenaga
47	April 2019 – March 2020	Akira Watanabe (2)	Kimura Kazuki	Masayuki Toyoshima	Takuya Nagase (2)	Kei Honda
46	April 2018 – March 2019	Masayuki Toyoshima	—	Akira Watanabe (5)	Akihito Hirose (2)	Takahiro Ōhashi
45	April 2017 – March 2018	Yoshiharu Habu (22)	Sōta Fujii	Tatsuya Sugai	Masayuki Toyoshima	Sōta Fujii
44	April 2016 – March 2017	Amahiko Satō	Hifumi Katō	Yoshiharu Habu (4)	Toshiaki Kubo (3)	Wataru Yashiro
43	April 2015 – March 2016	Yoshiharu Habu (21)	—	Akira Watanabe (5)	Amahiko Satō	Shintarō Saitō
42	April 2014 – March 2015	Yoshiharu Habu (20)	—	Tetsurō Itodani	Masataka Gōda	Shōta Chida
41	April 2013 – March 2014	Toshiyuki Moriuchi (2)	—	Yoshiharu Habu	Masataka Gōda	Tadashi Ōishi
40	April 2012 – March 2013	Akira Watanabe	Yoshiharu Habu (2)	Yoshiharu Habu (2)	Taichi Nakamura	Takuya Nagase
39	April 2011 – March 2012	Yoshiharu Habu (19)	—	Akira Watanabe	Masataka Gōda	Tatsuya Sugai
38	April 2010 – March 2011	Yoshiharu Habu (18)	—	Toshiaki Kubo; Akira Watanabe	Akihito Hirose	Masayuki Toyoshima
37	April 2009 – March 2010	Yoshiharu Habu (15)	—	Yasumitsu Satō	Kōichi Fukaura	Makoto Tobe
36	April 2008 – March 2009	Yasumitsu Satō	—	Yoshiharu Habu	Akira Watanabe	Amahiko Satō
35	April 2007 – March 2008	Yoshiharu Habu (14)	—	Toshiyuki Moriuchi; Akira Watanabe	Yasumitsu Satō	Yasuaki Murayama
34	April 2006 – March 2007	Yasumitsu Satō	—	Yoshiharu Habu	Akira Watanabe	Tetsurō Itodani
33	April 2005 – March 2006	Yoshiharu Habu	—	Toshiyuki Moriuchi; Akira Watanabe	Yasumitsu Satō	Shin'ya Satō
32	April 2004 – March 2005	Yoshiharu Habu	—	Special Achievement Award: Akira Watanabe; Technique Award: Yasumitsu Satō	Toshiyuki Yamasaki	Chikara Akutsu
31	April 2003 – March 2004	Toshiyuki Moriuchi	—	Special Achievement Award: Toshiaki Kubo; Technique Award: Kōichi Fukaura	Akira Watanabe	Kōsuke Tamura
30	April 2002 – March 2003	Yoshiharu Habu	Kōji Tanigawa	Special Achievement Award: Tadahisa Maruyama; Technique Award: Toshiyuki Moriuchi	Yasumitsu Satō	Akira Watanabe
29	April 2001 – March 2002	Yoshiharu Habu	—	Special Achievement Award: Masataka Gōda; Technique Award: Yasumitsu Satō	Toshiyuki Moriuchi	Ayumu Matsuo
28	April 2000 – March 2001	Yoshiharu Habu	—	Special Achievement Award: Tadahisa Maruyama; Technique Award: Takeshi Fujii	Toshiaki Kubo	Takayuki Yamasaki
27	April 1999 – March 2000	Yoshiharu Habu	—	Special Achievement Award: Takeshi Fujii; Technique Award: Tadahisa Maruyama	Daisuke Suzuki	Kazushiza Horiguchi
26	April 1998 – March 1999	Yoshiharu Habu	Satoshi Murayama	Special Achievement Award: Yasumitsu Satō; Technique Award: Takeshi Fujii	Masataka Gōda	Kazuki Kimura
25	April 1997 – March 1998	Kōji Tanigawa	—	Special Achievement Award: Nobuyuki Yashiki; Technique Award: Yasumitsu Satō	Masataka Gōda	Keiichi Sanada
24	April 1996 – March 1997	Yoshiharu Habu	Ichiyo Shimizu	Special Achievement Award: Hiroyuki Miura; Technique Award: Toshiyuki Moriuchi	Nobuyuki Yashiki	Daisuke Suzuki
23	April 1995 – March 1996	Yoshiharu Habu	Yoshiharu Habu	Special Achievement Award: Masataka Gōda; Technique Award: Yasumitsu Satō	Keiji Mori	Hisashi Namekata
22	April 1994 – March 1995	Habu Yoshiharu	Kōji Tanigawa	Special Achievement Award: Masataka Gōda; Technique Award: Taku Morishita	Kōichi Fukaura	Tadahisa Maruyama
21	April 1993 – March 1994	Habu Yoshiharu	Kunio Yonenaga	Special Achievement Award: Yasumitsu Satō; Technique Award: Toshiyuki Moriuchi	Kōichi Fukaura	Kōichi Fukaura
20	April 1992 – March 1993	Yoshiharu Habu	—	Special Achievement Award: Masataka Gōda; Technique Award: Yasumitsu Satō	Satoshi Murayama	Masataka Gōda
19	April 1991 – March 1992	Kōji Tanigawa	Yasuharu Ōyama	Special Achievement Award: Toshiyuki Moriuchi; Technique Award: Taku Morishita	Yoshiharu Habu	Hiroki Nakata
18	April 1990 – March 1991	Kōji Tanigawa	—	Special Achievement Award: Toshiyuki Moriuchi; Technique Award: Taku Morishita	Kenji Kobayashi	Yasumitsu Satō
17	April 1989 – March 1990	Yoshiharu Habu	Tatsuya Futakami	Special Achievement Award: Kunio Yonenaga; Technique Award: Yoshikazu Minami	Taku Morishita	Nobuyuki Yashiki
16	April 1988 – March 1989	Yoshiaru Habu	—	Special Achievement Award: Akira Shima; Technique Award: Keiji Mori and Torahiko Tanaka	Yoshikazu Minami	Toshiyuki Moriuchi
15	April 1987 – March 1988	Kōji Tanigawa	—	Special Achievement Award: Yoshikazu Minami; Technique Award: Yasuaki Tsukada	Yoshiharu Habu	Taku Morishita
14	April 1986 – March 1987	Michio Takahashi	Nobuyuki Ōuchi	Special Achievement Award: Bungo Fukusaki; Technique Award: Yasuaki Tsukada	Osamu Nakamura	Yoshiharu Habu
13	April 1985 – March 1986	Kōji Tanigawa	Yasuharu Ōyama	Special Achievement Award: Osamu Nakamura; Technique Award: Michio Takahashi	Yasuaki Tsukada	Eisaku Tomioka
12	April 1984 – March 1985	Kunio Yonenaga	Jirō Katō	Special Achievement Award: Kiyozumi Kiriyama; Technique Award: Michio Ariyoshi	Osamu Nakamura	Akira Shima
11	April 1983 – March 1984	Kunio Yonenaga	Kōji Tanigawa	Special Achievement Award: Hidemitsu Moriyasu; Technique Award: Kiyozumi Kiriyama	Torahiko Tanaka	Michio Takahashi
10	April 1982 – March 1983	Makoto Nakahara	—	Special Achievement Award: Kōji Tanigawa; Technique Award: Kunio Naitō	Kiyozumi Kiriyama	Yoshikazu Minami
9	April 1981 – March 1982	Hifumi Katō	—	Special Achievement Award: Hidemitsu Moriyasu; Technique Award: Kōji Tanigawa	Torahiko Tanaka	Osamu Nakamura
8	April 1980 – March 1981	Tatsuya Futakami	—	Special Achievement Award: Hifumi Katō; Technique Award: Osamu Katsuura	Kiyozumi Kiriyama	Kenji Kobayashi
7	April 1979 – March 1980	Yasuharu Ōyama (2)	—	Special Achievement Award: Yoshinori Kimura; Technique Award: Kōji Tanigawa	Hitoshige Awaji	Bungo Fukusaki
6	April 1978 – March 1979	Kunio Yonenaga	—	Special Achievement Award: Hifumi Katō; Technique Award: Torahiko Tanaka	Kazuo Ishida	Kōji Tanigawa
5	April 1977 – March 1978	Makoto Nakahara (4)	—	Special Achievement Award: Hifumi Katō; Technique Award: Hidemitsu Moriyasu	Motoji Hanamura	Hitoshige Awaji
4	April 1976 – March 1977	Makoto Nakahara (3)	—	Special Achievement Award: Keiji Mori; Technique Award: Hifumi Katō	Kazuo Manabe	Torahiko Tanaka
3	April 1975 – March 1976	Makoto Nakahara (2)	Yasuharu Ōyama	Special Achievement Award: Kiyozumi Kiriyama; Technique Award: Shigeyuki Matsuda	Nobuyuki Ōuchi	Teruichi Aono
2	April 1974 – March 1975	Makoto Nakahara	Yasuharu Ōyama (2)	Special Achievement Award: Nobuyuki Ōuchi; Technique Award: Kunio Yonenaga	Michihito Kumagai	Kazuo Manabe
1	April 1973 – March 1974	Yasuharu Ōyama	Yoshio Kimura	Special Achievement Award: Susumu Itaya; Technique Award: Kunio Naitō	Yasuo Harada	Hidemitsu Moriyasu

==== Statistical performance ====
No.	Shogi year	Most Games Played	Most Games Won	Best Winning Percentage	Most Consecutive Games Won
53	April 2025 – March 2026	Takuya Nagase (2): 71 games	Takumi Itō (2): 46 wins; Takuya Nagase (2): 46 wins	Nagisa Fujimoto: 40 wins – 12 losses, 0.769 winning percentage	Reo Koyama: 13 games; Yūki Saitō: 13 games
52	April 2024 – March 2025	Reo Okabe: 63 games	Reo Okabe: 49 wins	Shin'ichirō Hattori: 43 wins – 8 losses, 0.846 winning percentage	Nagisa Fujimoto: 17 games; Reo Okabe: 17 games
51	April 2023 – March 2024	Takumi Itō: 69 games	Takumi Itō: 51 wins; Nagisa Fujimoto: 51 wins	Sōta Fujii (6): 46 wins – 8 losses, 0.852 winning percentage	Daichi Sasaki: 15 games
50	April 2022 – March 2023	Shin'ichirō Hattori: 68 games	Sōta Fujii (5): 53 wins	Sōta Fujii (4): 53 wins – 11 losses, 0.828 winning percentage	Kazushi Watanabe (2): 18 games
49	April 2021 – March 2022	Sōta Fujii (2): 64 games	Sōta Fujii (4): 52 wins	Takumi Itō: 45 wins – 10 losses, 0.818 winning percentage	Kazushi Watanabe: 20 games
48	April 2020 – March 2021	Takuya Nagase: 68 games	Sōta Fujii (3): 44 wins; Takuya Nagase: 44 wins	Sōta Fujii (3): 44 wins – 8 losses, 0.846 winning percentage	Shingo Sawada: 14 games
47	April 2019 – March 2020	Daichi Sasaki: 67 games	Sōta Fujii (2): 53 wins	Sōta Fujii (2): 53 wins – 12 losses, 0.815 winning percentage	Takuya Nagase (3): 15 games
46	April 2018 – March 2019	Akihito Hirose: 64 games	Daichi Sasaki: 46 wins	Sōta Fujii (2): 45 wins – 8 losses, 0.849 winning percentage	Akira Watanabe: 15 games
45	April 2017 – March 2018	Sōta Fujii: 73 games	Sōta Fujii: 61 wins	Sōta Fujii: 61 wins – 12 losses, 0.836 winning percentage	Sōta Fujii: 29 games
44	April 2017 – March 2018	Shōta Chida: 65 games; Yūki Sasaki: 65 games	Shōta Chida: 48 wins	Mirai Aoshima: 42 wins – 14 losses, 0.750 winning percentage; Shintarō Saitō: 27 wins – 9 losses, 0.750 winning percentage	Masayuki Toyoshima: 12 games; Mirai Aoshima; 12 games (twice)
43	April 2016 – March 2017	Amahiko Satō: 59 games	Amahiko Satō: 41 wins	Shintarō Saitō: 40 wins – 12 losses, 0.769 winning percentage	Amahiko Satō (2): 15 games
42	April 2015 – March 2016	Toyoshima Masayuki (2): 56 games	Tatsuya Sugai: 43 wins	Tatsuya Sugai: 43 wins – 11 losses, 0.769 winning percentage	Hiroaki Yokoyama: 13 games
41	April 2014 – March 2015	Yoshiharu Habu (12): 62 games	Yoshiharu Habu (14): 42 games	Yasuaki Murayama (2): 33 wins – 10 losses, 0.767 winning percentage	Takuya Nagase (2): 12 games
40	April 2013 – March 2014	Yoshiharu Habu (11): 68 games	Yoshiharu Habu (13): 51 wins	Takuya Nagase: 44 wins – 12 losses, 0.786 winning percentage	Taichi Nakamura: 15 games
39	April 2012 – March 2013	Yoshiyaru Habu (10): 63 games	Yoshiharu Habu (12): 44 wins; Masayuki Toyoshima (2): 44 wins	Taichi Nakamura: 40 wins – 7 losses, 0.851 winning percentage	Takuya Nagase: 18 games
38	April 2011 – March 2012	Akira Watanabe: 58 games	Yoshiharu Habu (11): 43 wins	Amahiko Satō: 35 wins – 9 losses, 0.795 winning percentage	Amahiko Satō: 17 games
37	April 2010 – March 2011	Toshiaki Kubo (2): 61 games	Masayuki Toyoshima: 45 games	Masayuki Toyoshima: 45 wins – 14 losses, 0.763 winning percentage	Chikara Akutsu: 13 games
36	April 2009 – March 2010	Toshiaki Kubo: 73 games	Toshiaki Kubo: 49 wins	Atsushi Miyata: 28 wins – 9 losses, 0.757 winning percentage	Kōta Kanai: 11 games
35	April 2008 – March 2009	Yoshiharu Habu (9): 62 games	Yoshiharu Habu (10): 44 wins	Yasuaki Murayama: 36 wins – 10 losses, 0.783 winning percentage	Makoto Sasaki: 13 games; Kazutoshi Satō: 13 games
34	April 2007 – March 2008	Yasumitsu Satō (2): 86 games	Yasumitsu Satō (2): 57 wins	Chikara Akutsu: 0.776 winning percentage	Tetsurō Itodani: 14 games
33	April 2006 – March 2007	Yoshiharu Habu (8): 62 games	Akira Watanabe: 41 wins	Shin'ya Satō: 0.787 winning percentage	Yoshiharu Habu (5): 18 games
32	April 2005 – March 2006	Yoshiharu Habu (7): 78 games	Yoshiharu Habu (9): 60 wins	Masakazu Kondō: 0.822 winning percentage	Masakazu Kondō: 14 games
31	April 2004 – March 2005	Toshiyuki Moriuchi (2): 64 games	Toshiyuki Moriuchi (2): 46 wins	Kōichi Fukaura: 0.761 winning percentage	Takayuki Yamasaki (2): 22 games
30	April 2003 – March 2004	Yoshiharu Habu (6): 74 games	Yoshiharu Habu (8): 50 wins	Takayuki Yamasaki: 0.745 winning percentage	Takayuki Yamasaki: 16 games
29	April 2002 – March 2003	Kazuki Kimura: 73 games	Kazuki Kimura: 61 wins	Kazuki Kimura (2): 0.836 winning percentage	Yasumitsu Satō (2): 17 games
28	April 2001 – March 2002	Yoshiharu Habu (5): 89 games	Yoshiharu Habu (7): 68 wins	Yoshiharu Habu (7): 0.764 winning percentage	Yoshiharu Habu (4): 14 games
27	April 2000 – March 2001	Kōji Tanigawa (5): 68 games; Tadahisa Maruyama: 68 games	Tadahisa Maruyama (2): 50 wins	Kazuki Kimura: 0.797 winning percentage	Tadahisa Maruyama (3): 18 games
26	April 1999 – March 2000	Takeshi Fujii: 59 games; Yoshiharu Habu (4): 59 games; Kōji Tanigawa (4): 59 games	Takeshi Fujii: 43 wins	Hisashi Namekata: 0.778 winning percentage	Toshiaki Kubo: 14 games
25	April 1998 – March 1999	Masataka Gōda (2): 63 games	Masataka Gōda (2): 48 wins	Masatka Gōda: 0.762 winning percentage	Nobuyuki Yashiki: 15 games
24	April 1997 – March 1998	Kōji Tanigawa (3): 63 games; Takashi Abe: 63 games	Takashi Abe: 47 wins	Daisuke Suzuki: 0.757 winning percentage	Daisuke Suzuki: 14 games
23	April 1996 – March 1997	Kōichi Fukaura: 66 games	Yoshiharu Habu (6): 46 wins; Tadahisa Maruyama: 46 wins; Kōichi Fukaura: 46 wins	Yoshiharu Habu (6): 0.836 winning percentage	Tadahisa Maruyama (2): 17 games
22	April 1995 – March 1996	Masataka Gōda: 71 games	Yoshiharu Habu: 52 wins (5); Masataka Gōda: 52 wins	Toshiaki Kubo: 0.810 winning percentage	Tadahisa Maruyama: 24 games
21	April 1994 – March 1995	Yasumitsu Satō: 71 games	Yasumitsu Satō: 50 wins	Keita Inoue: 0.756 winning percentage	Yasumitsu Satō: 15 games
20	April 1993 – March 1994	Yoshiharu Habu (3): 78 games	Yoshiharu Habu (4): 61 wins	Yoshiharu Habu (5): 0.782 winning percentage	Yoshiharu Habu (3): 22 games
19	April 1992 – March 1993	Toshiyuki Moriuchi: 79 games	Toshiyuki Moriuchi: 63 wins	Toshiyuki Moriuchi: 0.797 winning percentage	Hiroki Nakata (2): 18 games
18	April 1991 – March 1994	Taku Morishita: 74 games	Taku Morishita: 56 wins	Taku Morishita: 0.757 winning percentage	Hiroki Nakata: 16 games
17	April 1990 – March 1991	Yoshiharu Habu (2): 71 games	Yoshiharu Habu (3): 53 wins	Yoshiharu Habu (4): 0.757 winning percentage	Yoshiharu Habu (2): 15 games
16	April 1989 – March 1990	Yoshiharu Habu: 80 games	Yoshiharu Habu (2): 64 wins	Yoshiharu Habu (3): 0.800 winning percentage	Yoshiharu Habu: 18 games
15	April 1988 – March 1989	Michio Takahashi : 71 games	Yoshiharu Habu: 50 wins	Yoshiharu Habu (2): 0.820 winning percentage	Hiroshi Kamiya: 28 games
14	April 1987 – March 1988	Kōji Tanigawa (2): 76 games	Kōji Tanigawa (2): 47 wins	Yoshiharu Habu: 0.741 winning percentage; Hiroki Nakata: 0.741 winning percentage	Yasuaki Tsukada: 22 games
13	April 1986 – March 1987	Kōji Tanigawa: 86 games	Kōji Tanigawa: 56 wins	Eisaku Tomioka: 0.740 winning percentage	Yoshikazu Minami: 15 games
12	April 1985 – March 1986	Hifumi Katō: 77 games	Hifumi Katō (2): 44 wins; Michio Ariyoshi: 44 wins; Akira Shima: 44 wins	Michio Ariyoshi: 0.746 winning percentage	Michio Ariyoshi (2): 22 games
11	April 1984 – March 1985	Hidemitsu Moriyasu (2): 74 games	Kiyozumi Kiriyama: 47 wins	Torahiko Tanaka (4): 0.698 winning percentage	Shūichi Ono: 10 games
10	April 1983 – March 1984	Makoto Nakahara: 82 games	Makoto Nakahara: 52 wins	Yoshikazu Minami: 0.769 winning percentage	Yoshikazu Minami: 15 games
9	April 1982 – March 1983	Hidemitsu Moriyasu: 71 games	Hidemitsu Moriyasu: 46 wins	Torahiko Tanaka (3): 0.763 winning percentage	Hifumi Katō (2): 13 games
8	April 1981 – March 1982	Kunio Yonenaga (6): 88 games	Kunio Yonenaga (3): 55 wins	Torahiko Tanaka (2): 0.723 winning percentage	Michio Ariyoshi: 13 games
7	April 1980 – March 1981	Yasuharu Ōyama (3): 74 games	Yasuharu Ōyama (4): 53 wins	Bungo Fukusaki: 0.786 winning percentage	Hatasu Itō: 12 games
6	April 1979 – March 1980	Kunio Yonenaga (5): 69 games	Kunio Yonenaga (2): 47 wins	Torahiko Tanaka: 0.714 winning percentage	Teruichi Aono: 15 games
5	April 1978 – March 1979	Kunio Yonenaga (4): 65 games; Hitoshige Awaji: 65 games	Hitoshige Awaji: 43 wins	Hidemitsu Moriyasu: 0.792 winning percentage	Nobuyuki Ōuchi: 14 games
4	April 1977 – March 1978	Kunio Yonenaga (3): 62 games	Hifumi Katō: 42 wins	Keiji Mori: 0.745 winning percentage	Yasuharu Ōyama: 10 games; Hifumi Katō: 10 games; Keiji Mori: 10 games; Toshiyuki Tsubouchi: 10 games; Torahiko Tanaka: 10 games
3	April 1976 – March 1977	Yasuharu Ōyama (2): 73 games	Yasuharu Ōyama (3): 48 wins	Teruichi Aono: 0.745 winning percentage	Kazuo Ishida: 13 games
2	April 1975 – March 1976	Yasuharu Ōyama: 75 games; Kunio Yonenaga (2): 75 games	Yasuharu Ōyama (2): 48 wins	Kiyosumi Kiriyama: 0.756 winning percentage	Nobuyuki Ōuchi: 14 games
1	April 1974 – March 1975	Kunio Yonenaga: 67 games	Yasuharu Ōyama: 39 wins; Kunio Yonenaga: 39 wins	Makoto Nakahara: 0.721 winning percentage	Makoto Nakahara: 12 games

==== Game of the Year ====
No.	Shogi year	Game of the Year (Winner indicated in bold) (Note: Started with the 34th Annual Shogi Awards. For the 34th and 35th Annual Shogi Awards, games played from January 1 to December 31 (i.e., throughout the calendar year) were eligible for the prize; starting with the 36th Annual Shogi Awards, however, games played from April 1 until March 31 (i.e., the professional shogi year) were eligible for the award.)	Special Game of the Year (Winner indicated in bold) (Note: Started with the 36th Annual Shogi Awards.)
53	April 2025 – March 2026	Sōta Fujii vs. **Takumi Itō**, 73rd Ōza Title Match Game 5	–
52	April 2024 – March 2025	Sōta Fujii vs. **Takumi Itō**, 9th Eiō Title Match Game 5	**Sōta Fujii** vs. Yasuhiro Masuda, 74th NHK Cup TV Shogi Tournament Semifinals
51	April 2023 – March 2024	**Sōta Fujii** vs. Masayuki Toyoshima, 71st Ōza Tournament Challenger Playoff	Takuya Nagase vs. **Sōta Fujii**, 71st Ōza Title Match Game 4
50	April 2023 – March 2024	Sōta Fujii vs. **Yoshiharu Habu**, 72nd Ōshō Title March Game 2	**Sōta Fujii** vs. Yasuhiro Masuda, 16th Asahi Cup Open Main Tournament Quarterfinal Round
49	April 2022 – March 2023	Toyoshima Masayuki vs. **Sōta Fujii**, 34th Ryūō Title Match Game 4	–
48	April 2021 – March 20	Akira Watanabe vs. **Sōta Fujii**, 92nd Kisei Title Match, Game 1	**Sōta Fujii** vs. Ayumu Matsuo, 34th Ryūō Tournament, Group 2 Ranking Game
47	April 2020 – March 2021	Masayuki Toyoshima vs. **Kazuki Kimura**, 60th Ōi Title Match Game 7	**Akihito Hirose** vs. Sōta Fujii, 69th Ōshō Tournament Challenger Determination League Round 7
46	April 2019 – March 2020	Amahiko Satō vs. **Yoshiharu Habu**, 76th Meijin Title Match Game 1	Mana Watanabe vs. **Hatsumi Ueda**, 45 Women's Meijin League Round 4
45	April 2018 – March 2019	Akira Watanabe vs. **Yoshiharu Habu**, 30th Ryūō Title Match Game 4	**Sōta Fujii** vs. Akihito Hirose, 11th Asahi Cup Open Main Tournament Final; Mitsunori Makino vs. Toshiyuki Nakao, 31 Ryūō Tournament Group 6 Ranking Game (game ended in impasse)
44	April 2017 – March 2018	**Yasumitsu Satō** vs. Kōichi Fukaura, 75th Meijin League A Class Round 8	**Kana Satomi** vs. Hatsumi Ueda, 43rd Women's Meijin Title Match Game 5
43	April 2016 – March 2017	**Akira Watanabe** vs. Amahiko Satō, 41st Kiō Title Match Game 4	Yoshiharu Habu vs. **Kenjirō Abe**, 41st Kiō Challenger Determination Tournament Round 3
42	April 2015 – March 2016	**Yoshiharu Habu** vs. Masayuki Toyoshima, 62nd Ōza Title Match Game 5	**Mitsunori Makino** vs. Ryūma Tonari, 46th Shinjin-Ō Tournament Round 2
41	April 2014 – March 2015	**Yoshiharu Habu** vs. Taichi Nakamura, 61st Ōza Title Match Game 4 (Sennichite replay game)	**Hiroyuki Miura** vs. Toshiaki Kubo, 72nd Meijin League A Class Round 9
40	April 2013 – March 2014	Akira Watanabe vs. **Yoshiharu Habu**, 60th Ōza Title Match Game 4	**Kana Satomi** vs. Hatsumi Ueda, 39th Women's Meijin Title Match Game 5
39	April 2012 – March 2013	**Akira Watanabe** vs. Tadahisa Maruyama, 24th Ryūō Title Match Game 4	–
38	April 2011 – March 2012	**Akihito Hirose** vs. Kōichi Fukaura, 51st Ōi Title Match Game 6	Takeshi Fujii vs. **Toshiyuki Moriuchi**, 69th Meijin League A Class Round 7
37	April 2010 – March 2011	**Toshiaki Kubo** vs. Yasumitsu Satō, 35th Kiō Title Match Game 5	Kōichi Kodama vs. **Kōta Kanai**, 68th Meijin League C2 Class Round 9
36	April 2009 – March 2010	**Akira Watanabe** vs. Yoshiharu Habu, 21st Ryūō Title Match Game 7	–
35	April 2008 – March 2009	Yoshiharu Habu vs. **Kōichi Fukaura**, 48th Ōi Title Match Game 7	–
34	April 2007 – March 2008	**Kōji Tanigawa** vs. Yoshiharu Habu, 64th Meijin League A Class Playoff	–

=== Women's professionals ===
Below is a table of the awards given and the award winners for each year.

No.	Shogi Year	Women's Player of the Year (Note: Prior to the 27th Annual Shogi Awards, there was one award for women shogi professionals. Starting with the 27th Annual Shogi Awards, the award was divided into two categories: "Player of the Year" and "Women's Professional Award" (later renamed to "Women's Excellent Player".)	Women's Excellent Player (Note: Renamed from "Women's Professional Award" starting with the 45th Annual Shogi Awards. The "Women's Professional Award" started with the 8th Annual Shogi Awards.)	Women's Most Games Played (Note: Starting with the 37th Annual Shogi Awards)	Women's Game of the Year (Note: Starting with 46th Annual Shogi Awards.)	Special Game of the Year
53	April 2025 – March 2026	Kana Fukuma (16)	Tomoka Nishiyama (5)	Sae Itō: 54 games (5)	Kana Fukuma vs. Nanami Naka: 47th Women's Ōshō Challenger Determination Tournament Championship Game	—
52	April 2024 – March 2025	Kana Fukuma (15)	Tomoka Nishiyama (4)	Momoko Katō: 53 games (3)	Tomoka Nishiyama vs. Kana Fukuma: 4th Hakurei Title Match Game 1	—
51	April 2023 – March 2024	Kana Fukuma (14)	Tomoka Nishiyama (3)	Momoko Katō: 52 games (2)	Kana Satomi vs. Tomoka Nishiyama: 3rd Hakurei Title Match Game 2	—
50	April 2022 – March 2023	Kana Fukuma (13)	Tomoka Nishiyama (2)	Tomoka Nishiyama: 65 games	Kana Satomi vs. Momoko Katō: 12th Women's Ōza Title Match Game 5	—
49	April 2021 – March 2022	Kana Fukuma (12)	Tomoka Nishiyama	Sae Itō: 54 games (4)	Kana Satomi vs. Sae Itō: 47th Women's Meijin Title Match Game 2	—
48	April 2020 – March 2021	Kana Fukuma (11)	Kotomi Yamane	Momoko Katō: 43 games	Tomoka Nishiyama vs. Kana Satomi: 10th Women's Ōza Title Match Game 5	—
47	April 2019 – March 2020	Kana Satomi (10)	Sae Itō (2)	Sae Itō (3): 46 games	Kana Satomi vs. Tomoka Nishiyama: 9th Women's Ōza Title Match Game 4	—
46	April 2018 – March 2019	Kana Satomi (9)	Mana Watanabe	Sae Itō (2): 36 games	Kana Satomi vs. Mana Watanabe: 29th Women's Ōi Title Match	Mana Watanabe vs. Hatsumi Ueda: 45th Women's Meijin League
45	April 2017 – March 2018	Kana Satomi (8)	Sae Itō	Sae Itō: 41 games	—	—
44	April 2016 – March 2017	Kana Satomi (7)	Hatsumi Ueda (2)	Yuki Muroya (2): 40 games	—	Kana Satomi vs. Hatsumi Ueda: 43rd Women's Meijin Title Match Game 5
43	April 2015 – March 2016	Kana Satomi (6)	Yuki Muroya	Yuki Muroya: 33 games	—	—
42	April 2014 – March 2015	Tomomi Kai	Manao Kagawa	Ichiyo Shimizu: 37 games	—	—
41	April 2013 – March 2014	Kana Satomi (5)	Tomomi Kai	Manao Kagawa: 37 games	—	—
40	April 2012 – March 2013	Kana Satomi (4)	Hatsumi Ueda	Hiroe Nakai (2): 38 games	—	Kana Satomi vs. Hatsumi Ueda: 39th Women's Meijin Title Match Game 5
39	April 2011 – March 2012	Kana Satomi (3)	Ichiyo Shimizu (3)	Ichiyo Shimizu (2): 55 games	—	—
38	April 2010 – March 2011	Kana Satomi (2)	Tomomi Kai	Ichiyo Shimizu: 30 games; Hiroe Nakai: 30 games	—	—
37	April 2009 – March 2010	Kana Satomi	Ichiyo Shimizu	Hatsumi Ueda; Shinobu Iwane	—	—
36	April 2008 – March 2009	Ichiyo Shimizu (5)	Kana Satomi (2)	—	—	—
35	April 2007 – March 2008	Ichiyo Shimizu (4)	Rieko Yauchi	—	—	—
34	April 2006 – March 2007	Rieko Yauchi (2)	Kana Satomi	—	—	—
33	April 2005 – March 2006	Rieko Yauchi	Ryoko Chiba	—	—	—
32	April 2004 – March 2005	Ichiyo Shimizu	Harue Nakai	—	—	—
31	April 2003 – March 2004	Ichiyo Shimizu	Harue Nakai	—	—	—
30	April 2002 – March 2003	Harue Nakai	Sachio Ishibashi	—	—	—
29	April 2001 – March 2002	Harue Nakai	Ichiyo Shimizu	—	—	—
28	April 2000 – March 2001	Ichiyo Shimizu	Haruko Saida	—	—	—
27	April 1999 – March 2000	Sachio Ishibashi	Harue Nakai	—	—	—
26	April 1998 – March 1999	—	Ichiyo Shimizu	—	—	—
25	April 1997 – March 1998	—	Ichiyo Shimizu	—	—	—
24	April 1996 – March 1997	—	Ichiyo Shimizu	—	—	—
23	April 1995 – March 1996	—	Ichiyo Shimizu	—	—	—
22	April 1994 – March 1995	—	Ichiyo Shimizu	—	—	—
21	April 1993 – March 1994	—	Ichiyo Shimizu	—	—	—
20	April 1992 – March 1993	—	Hiroe Nakai	—	—	—
19	April 1991 – March 1992	—	Ichiyo Shimizu	—	—	—
18	April 1990 – March 1991	—	Naoko Hayashiba	—	—	—
17	April 1989 – March 1990	—	Naoko Hayashiba	—	—	—
16	April 1988 – March 1989	—	Hiroe Nakai	—	—	—
15	April 1987 – March 1988	—	Ichiyo Shimizu	—	—	—
14	April 1986 – March 1987	—	Hiroe Nakai; Naoko Hayashiba	—	—	—
13	April 1985 – March 1986	—	Hiroe Nakai	—	—	—
12	April 1984 – March 1985	—	Naoko Hayashiba	—	—	—
11	April 1983 – March 1984	—	Naoko Hayashiba	—	—	—
10	April 1982 – March 1983	—	Naoko Hayashiba	—	—	—
9	April 1981 – March 1982	—	Akiko Takojima	—	—	—
8	April 1981 – March 1982	—	Kazuko Yamashita; Akiko Takojima	—	—	—

== Kōzō Masuda Awards ==
The Kōzō Masuda Award (升田幸三賞 Masuda Kōzō shō) and the Kōzō Masuda Special Prize (升田幸三賞特別賞 Masuda Kōzō shō takubetsu shō) are two prizes awarded to professional or amateur players who have made an outstanding contribution to the development and evolution of shogi openings by way of innovation or excellence in shogi theory or tactics. The awards are named after the innovative player, Kōzō Masuda. The Masuda Award is given out yearly since 1995 while the Masuda Special Prize is awarded infrequently.

=== Winners ===
==== Masuda Award ====
- 1994 (22nd Annual Shogi Awards): Kunio Naitō for the Side Pawn Capture, Bishop-33 variations.
- 1995 (23rd Annual Shogi Awards): Makoto Nakahara for the Nakahara variation of Side Pawn Capture and the Nakahara castle.
- 1996 (24th Annual Shogi Awards): Takeshi Fujii for the Fujii System.
- 1997 (25th Annual Shogi Awards): Teruichi Aono for the Saginomiya joseki.
- 1998 (26th Annual Shogi Awards): Makoto Chūza for the Side Pawn Capture, Chūza's Rook.
- 1999 (27th Annual Shogi Awards): Kunio Yonenaga for the Yonenaga King.
- 2000 (28th Annual Shogi Awards): Hiroyuki Miura for the Millennium castle.
- 2001 (29th Annual Shogi Awards): Masakazu Kondō for the Cheerful Central Rook.
- 2002 (30th Annual Shogi Awards): Kōichi Kodama for the Crab Silvers.
- 2003 (31st Annual Shogi Awards): Kōji Tanigawa for his ...S-77+ move in his A-class Ranking Match against Akira Shima.
- 2004 (32nd Annual Shogi Awards): Daisuke Suzuki for the New Quick Ishida (4. P-7d).
- 2005 (33rd Annual Shogi Awards): Hitoshige Awaji for the Tempo Loss Bishop Exchange.
- 2006 (34th Annual Shogi Awards): Yasumitsu Satō for the ambition and variety of moves in Direct Opposing Rook.
- 2007 (35th Annual Shogi Awards): Kenji Imaizumi for the 1... R-32 opening.
- 2008 (36th Annual Shogi Awards): Toshiaki Kubo for his 6. R-7e move in the 2nd. match against Yasumitsu Satō for the 34th Kiō title.
- 2009 (37th Annual Shogi Awards): Eiji Iijima for the Iijima Bishop Pullback.
- 2010 (38th Annual Shogi Awards): Yoshitaka Hoshino for the Super High Speed Silver-37 strategy.
- 2011 (39th Annual Shogi Awards): Yasumitsu Satō for the move 13. K-57 in his first game against Toshiaki Kubo for the Ōshō title.
- 2012 (40th Annual Shogi Awards): Takeshi Fujii for the Bishop Exchange Fourth File Rook.
- 2013 (41st Annual Shogi Awards): Ayumu Matsuo for the ...K-52 variation of Side Pawn Capture.
- 2014 (42nd Annual Shogi Awards): Tatsuya Sugai for his many tactical variations against Central Rook Anaguma, Cheerful Central Rook, Quick Ishida and others.
- 2015 (43rd Annual Shogi Awards): Eisaku Tomioka for the Tomioka variation of Bishop Exchange, Reclining Silver.
- 2016 (44th Annual Shogi Awards): Shōta Chida for the Bishop Exchange, Reclining Silver variations K-42/G-62/R-81.
- 2017 (45th Annual Shogi Awards): Teruichi Aono for the Aono Side Pawn Capture, and Yūki Sasaki for the Yūki Side Pawn Capture .
- 2018 (46th Annual Shogi Awards): Sōta Fujii for the move 38. ... Rx7g+ in the final match of the 5th class of the 31st Ryūō Ranking tournament against Naohiro Ishida on June 5, 2018.
- 2019 (47th Annual Shogi Awards): The shogi engine elmo for developing the "elmo castle".
- 2020 (48th Annual Shogi Awards): Takahiro Ōhashi for the Yōryū Fourth File Rook
- 2021 (49th Annual Shogi Awards): Shōta Chida for the Bishop Exchange Gold-33 Rushing Silver Attack
- 2022 (50th Annual Shogi Awards): Hiroaki Ureshino (amateur) for Ureshino opening
- 2023 (51st Annual Shogi Awards): Takumi Itō for the (Impasse strategy used in Game 1 of the 49th Kiō Title Match)
- 2024 (52nd Annual Shogi Awards): Amahiko Satō for the Opposing Rook Bishop-66 strategy.
- 2025 (52nd Annual Shogi Awards): Hatasu Itō for the Pinwheel opening strategy.

==== Masuda Special Prize ====
- 2002 Katsumi Tateishi for the Tateishi Fourth File Rook.
- 2004 Taku Morishita for the Morishita System.
- 2008 Kazuo Manabe for his splendid, phantom ...*B-42 move in his (last) match against Masayuki Toyoshima.
- 2010 Takayuki Yamasaki for the New Yamasaki variation of Side Pawn Capture.
- 2014 Yasuaki Tsukada for the Tsukada Special developed in the mid-1980s.
- 2015 Hifumi Katō for his developments and many novel contributions for Climbing Silver over his 62-year career.
- 2016 Nobuyuki Ōuchi for his many developments in the strategy for Bear-in-the-hole Ranging Rook.
- 2017 Tadahisa Maruyama for his research on Bishop Exchange opening including Tempo Loss Bishop Exchange.
- 2018 Kenji Waki for the Waki System.
- 2019 Sōta Fujii for the move 58...S*31 in Game 2 of the 91st Kisei title match.
- 2021 Torahiko Tanaka for his developments in opening strategy for Static Rook Anaguma and Yagura Without Pushing the Rook Pawn among others.
- 2023 Akihiro Murata (Murata System)
