= Hiroyuki Miura (shogi) =

Japanese shogi player

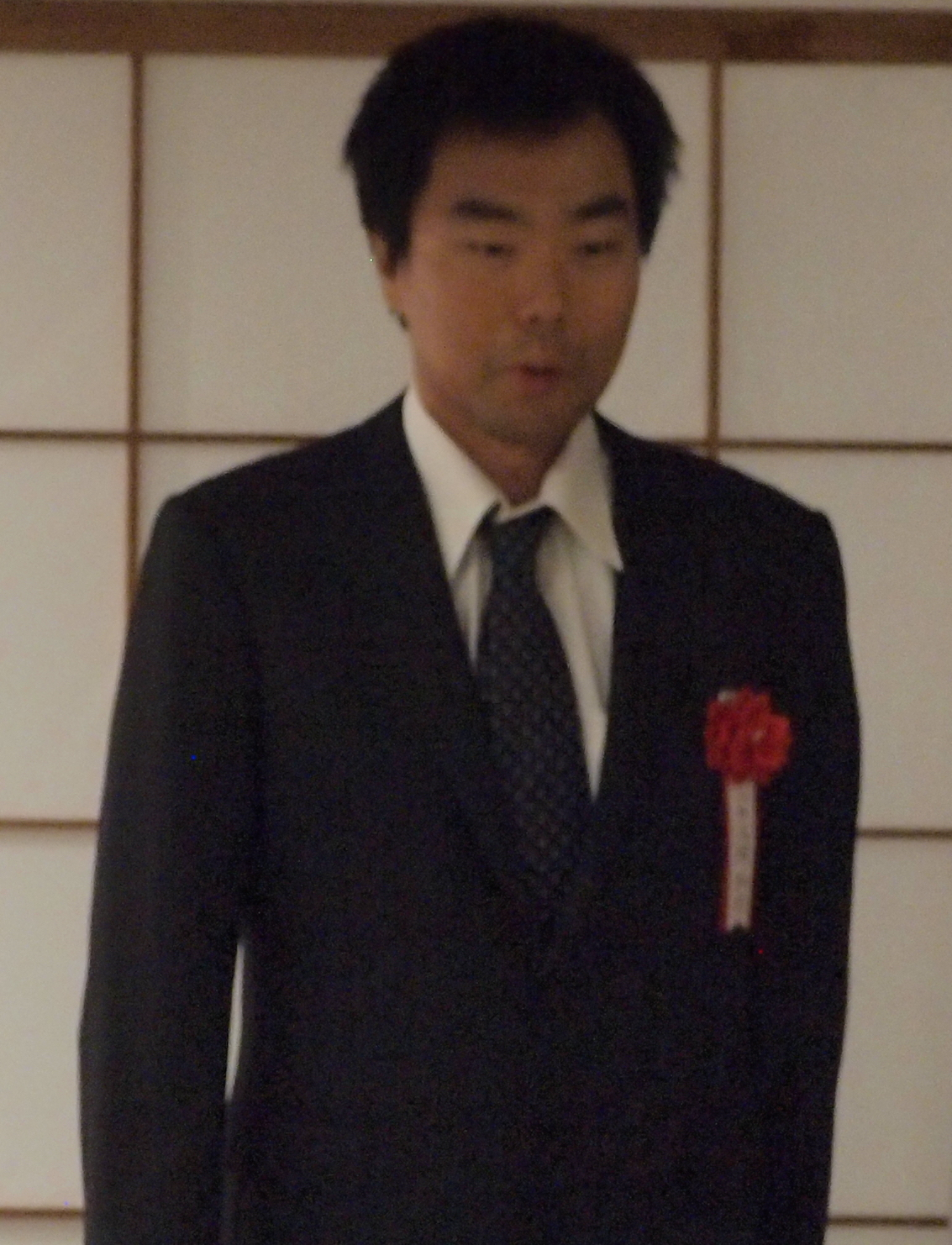
- Native name: 三浦弘行
- Born: February 13, 1974 (age 52)
- Hometown: Takasaki, Gunma

Career
- Achieved professional status: October 1, 1992 (aged 18)
- Badge number: 204
- Rank: 9-dan
- Teacher: Kazuyoshi Nishimura
- Major titles won: 1
- Tournaments won: 3
- Meijin class: B2
- Ryūō class: 1

Websites
- JSA profile page

Hiroyuki Miura (三浦 弘行, Miura Hiroyuki; born February 13, 1974) is a Japanese professional shogi player, ranked 9-dan. He is a former Kisei title holder and became the first active Class A professional to lose to a computer when he lost to the GPS Shogi program in April 2013.

In October 2016, he was falsely accused of cheating in the 29th Ryūō challenger controversy, which resulted in him losing the chance to play for the Ryūō title. A third-party investigative panel was convened and eventually cleared Miura of all charges. The panel's findings led to the resignation of the Japan Shogi Association's president as well as the dismissal of several board members.

== Early life and apprentice professional ==
Miura was born in Takasaki, Gunma, on February 13, 1974. In June 1987, he entered the Japan Shogi Association's apprentice school at the rank of 6-kyū as a protegee of shogi professional Kazuyoshi Nishimura. Miura achieved the rank of 1-dan in 1989 and obtained professional status and the rank of 4-dan in October 1992.

== Shogi professional ==
Miura's first appearance in a major title match came in 1995 when he challenged Yoshiharu Habu for the 66th Kisei title. Miura defeated Taku Morishita in the challenger playoff game to advance to the title match against Habu, but ended up losing the match 3 games to 0. The following year Miura defeated Nobuyuki Yashiki to advance to the 67th Kisei title match and once again challenge Habu. This time Miura won the match 3 games to 2 to hand Habu his first loss in a title match since becoming a 7-crown (simultaneously holding seven major titles at the same time). Miura was trailing the match after three games, but came back to win the next two for his first major title. Miura, however, was unable to defend his title in 1997 when he lost the 68th Kisei title match to Yashiki 3 games to 1.

In October 1998, Miura won the 29th Shinjin-Ō—a tournament for players ranked 6-dan or lower who are 26-years-old or younger—by defeating Naruyuki Hatakeyama 2 games to 0. While in March 2002, Miura defeated Manabu Senzaki to win the 52nd NHK Cup TV Shogi Tournament.

Miura finished first in 2009–2010 Class A in Meijin league play with a record of 7 wins and 2 losses to earn the right to challenge Habu for the 68th Meijin title but lost the match 4 games to 0.

Miura became the first active Class A professional to lose an officially sanctioned game to a computer when he was defeated by GPS Shogi in April 2013. Miura was participating in the 2nd Denou-sen—a series of games between five shogi professionals and five computer programs—and his game was the final one of the series.

In January 2014, Miura defeated Takuya Nagase to win the 39th Kiō challenger tournament (2013–2014) to advance to the 39th Kiō title match against Akira Watanabe. Miura was, however, unable to win a single game with Watanabe defending his title 3 games to 0.

On August 27, 2018, Miura defeated Daisuke Nakagawa in a 60th Ōi tournament preliminary round game to become the 54th professional shogi player to win 600 official games.

=== 29th Ryūō challenger controversy ===
In September 2016, Miura defeated Tadahisa Maruyama two games to one in the 29th Ryūō challenger match to earn the right to challenge Akira Watanabe for the 29th Ryūō title. It was the first time that Miura had qualified to be the challenger for the Ryūō title.

A few days before the match against Watanabe was scheduled to begin, the JSA announced that Maruyama would be replacing Miura as the challenger. The official reason given by the JSA had to do with Miura failing to follow proper procedure in requesting to be allowed to withdraw from the match, but there also had been suspicions raised about Miura's recent frequent leaving of his seat during official shogi games by some other professionals. Miura denied the accusations at a meeting of the JSA managing directors, but was subsequently suspended from official game play until December 31, 2016.

An independent investigative panel was established at the end of October 2016 to determine whether Miura had actually done anything wrong and to evaluate the appropriateness of the JSA's response to the allegations. The panel announced its findings at the end of December 2016, stating that it found insufficient evidence to support the accusations made against Miura and that the claim that he had excessively left his seat during official games was false. The panel also stated that it found the actions taken by the JSA in response were appropriate given the circumstances since the JSA had no real option other than to act the way it did. In response to the panel's findings, then JSA president Kōji Tanigawa and director Akira Shima announced in January 2017 that they were resigning from their posts to accept responsibility for the JSA's handling of the matter. Three other JSA board members were dismissed from their posts by a vote of the JSA membership at an emergency meeting held at the end of February 2017.

In May 2017, Miura and new JSA president Yasumitsu Satō held a joint press conference to announce that a settlement had been reached to resolve any outstanding issues between the two sides. Both sides acknowledged their acceptance of the findings in the independent investigative panel's report and expressed their desire to move on from the matter. It was also announced that the JSA agreed to pay Miura an undisclosed financial settlement to compensate him for not only lost game fees but also for the mental anguish and damage caused to his reputation. Miura also announced that he met with Ryūō title holder Watanabe prior to the press conference and that he accepted Watanabe's apology for his role in the controversy.

=== Promotion history ===
Miura's promotion history is as follows:

- 6-kyū: 1987
- 1-dan: 1989
- 4-dan: October 1, 1992
- 5-dan: April 1, 1995
- 6-dan: October 1, 1996
- 7-dan: April 1, 2000
- 8-dan: April 1, 2001
- 9-dan: August 16, 2013

=== Titles and other championships ===
Although Miura has appeared in major title matches five times, has won only one: the 67th Kisei title. In addition to the Kisei title, Miura has won three other shogi championships during his career: the 29th Shinjin-Ō (1998), the 52nd NHK Cup (2002), and the 36th Nihon Series JT Professional Tournament (2015).

=== Awards and honors ===
Miura has received a number of Japan Shogi Association Annual Shogi Awards throughout his career. He won the "Dedicated Service Award" for 1996–1997, the Kōzō Masuda Award for 2000–2001, and the "Special Game of the Year Award" for 2013–2014. In August 2018, he received the association's "Shogi Honor Award" in recognition of winning 600 official games as a professional.

=== Year-end prize money and game fee ranking ===
Miura has finished in the "Top 10" of the JSA's year-end prize money and game fee rankings eight times since 1993.

Year	Amount	Rank
1996	¥21,780,000	10th
2003	¥21,050,000	7th
2004	¥17,720,000	10th
2005	¥26,370,000	6th
2010	¥28,500,000	7th
2013	¥16,330,000	10th
2014	¥20,890,000	7th
2016	¥19,970,000	9th

- Note: All amounts are given in Japanese yen and include prize money and fees earned from official tournaments and games held from January 1 to December 31.
