= Tatsuya Sugai =

Japanese shogi player (born 1992)

- Native name: 菅井竜也
- Born: April 17, 1992 (age 34)
- Hometown: Mitsu, Okayama

Career
- Achieved professional status: April 1, 2010 (aged 17)
- Badge number: 278
- Rank: 8-dan
- Teacher: Keita Inoue (9-dan)
- Major titles won: 1
- Tournaments won: 4
- Meijin class: B1
- Ryūō class: 1

Websites
- JSA profile page

Tatsuya Sugai (菅井 竜也, Sugai Tatsuya; born April 17, 1992) is a Japanese professional shogi player ranked 8-dan. He is a former holder of the Ōi title.

== Early life, amateur shogi and apprenticeship ==
Tatsuya Suga was born on April 17, 1992, in Mitsu, Okayama. He learned how to play shogi from his father when he was about five years old. He entered into the Japan Shogi Association's apprentice school at the rank of 6-kyū as a student of shogi professional Keita Inoue in September 2004 and obtained professional status and the rank of 4-dan in April 2010 after winning the 46th 3-dan League (October 2009 – March 2010) with a record of 15 wins and 3 losses.

== Shogi professional ==
In 2011, Sugai as a 19-year-old 4-dan defeated Yasuaki Murayama in the championship game of the 5th Daiwa Securities Online Strongest Player Cup to win his first tournament championship as shogi professional.

In October 2015, Sugai defeated apprentice shogi professional 3-dan Takahiro Ōhashi 2 games to 1 to win the 46th Shinjin-Ō tournament for players ranked 6-dan or lower. Sugai lost the first game of the match but then won the next two.

Sugai's first appearance in a major title match came in 2017 when he defeated Yoshiharu Habu to win the 58th Ōi title. The following year, however, he was unable to successfully defend his title against Masayuki Toyoshima, losing the 59th Ōi title match 4 games to 3.

In December 2021, Sugai defeated Akira Watanabe to win the 29th Ginga tournament. (Note: The game was actually played in October 2021, but the final result was not made public until the game was broadcast on the Igo Shogi Channel on December 23, 2021.) A few months later in February 2022, he defeated Akira Inaba to win the 15th Asahi Cup, also for the first time.

In March 2023, Sugai defeated Takuya Nagase in the finals of the 8th Eiō challenger tournament to advance to the 8th Eiō title match (April 2023 – May 2023) against reigning Eiō Sōta Fujii. Although Sugai was able to win Game 2 of the match to even the match at one game apiece, Fujii won the next two games to win match 3 games to 1. The final game of the match, however, included two sennichite games, which meant it took three games that day to reach a conclusive result.

Later in 2023, Sugai won the 73rd Ōshō League (September – November 2024) with a record of 5 wins and 1 loss in his first season of league play. Sugai's win meant he earned the right to challenge Fujii once again, this time for the 73rd Ōshō title. His good form, however, did not continue and he lost the 73rd Ōshō title match (January – February 2024) 4 games to none.

=== Promotion history ===
The promotion history for Sugai is as follows:

- 6-kyū: September 29, 2004
- 4-dan: April 1, 2010
- 5-dan: August 21, 2011
- 6-dan: March 10, 2015
- 7-dan: November 5, 2015
- 8-dan: January 23, 2020

=== Titles and other championships ===
Sugai has appeared in four major title matches to date and has won one title. He has also won four non-title shogi championships during his career.

=== Awards and honors ===
Sugai has received the following Japan Shogi Association Annual Shogi Awards: "Best New Player" (2011), "Best Winning Percentage" (2014), "Most Games Won" (2014), “Kōzō Masuda Award” (2014), and "Fighting-spirit" (2021).

=== Year-end prize money and game fee ranking ===
Sugai has finished in the "Top 10" of the JSA's year-end prize money and game fee rankings six times: 7th with JPY 23,630,000 in earnings in 2017; 9th with JPY 21,930,000 in earnings in 2018; 10th with JPY 16,740,000 in earnings in 2021; and 7th with JPY 19,700,000 in earnings in 2022. and 7th with JPY 19,590,000 in earnings in 2023; and 9th with JPY 16,480,000 in earnings in 2024.
