= Daisuke Suzuki (shogi) =

Japanese shogi player (born 1974)

- Native name: 鈴木大介
- Born: July 11, 1974 (age 51)
- Hometown: Machida, Tokyo

Career
- Achieved professional status: October 1, 1994 (aged 20)
- Badge number: 213
- Rank: 9-dan
- Teacher: Nobuyuki Ōuchi (9-dan)
- Tournaments won: 2
- Meijin class: C1
- Ryūō class: 3
- Notable students: Hirotaka Kajiura

Websites
- JSA profile page

Daisuke Suzuki (鈴木 大介, Suzuki Daisuke; born July 11, 1974) is a Japanese professional shogi player ranked 9-dan. He is a former executive director of the Japan Shogi Association.

Suzuki is also the first professional shogi player to be awarded professional status by the Japan Professional Mahjong League (JPML) and become a professional mahjong player.

== Early life, amateur shogi and apprenticeship ==
Daisuke Suzuki was born in Machida, Tokyo, on July 11, 1974. He won the 11th Elementary School Student Meijin Tournament tournament in 1986, defeating fellow future shogi professional Toshiaki Kubo in the semi-final round.

In June 1986, Suzuki entered the Japan Shogi Association's apprentice school at the rank of 6-kyū as a protegee of shogi professional Nobuyuki Ōuchi. He was promoted to 1-dan in October 1988, and then obtained full professional status and the rank of 4-dan in October 1994.

== Shogi professional ==
Suzuki's first tournament victory as a professional came in 1996 when he defeated Takashi Abe to win the 15th Hayazashi Shineisen tournament. In March 1999, he defeated Masataka Gōda to win the 49th NHK Shogi TV Tournament for his only other tournament victory.

In October 1999, Suzuki made his first appearance in a major title match as the challenger to Takeshi Fujii for the 12th Ryūō title, but lost the match 4 games to 1. In 2006, he defeated Yoshiharu Habu to earn the right to challenge defending champion Yasumitsu Satō for the 77th Kisei title, but ended up losing the match 3 games to none.

=== Playing style and theoretical contributions ===
Suzuki is considered to be one of the foremost specialists in the Ranging Rook opening. Suzuki and fellow ranging rook specialists Takeshi Fujii and Toshiaki Kubo are collectively referred to as the "Ranging Rook Big Three".

Suzuki has also been recognized for his contributions to opening theory and received the 32nd Kōzō Masuda Award for the 2004–5 shogi year for his development of the New Quick Ishida attacking formation.

On December 20, 2024, Suzuki became the 64th shogi professional to win 600 official games.

=== Promotion history ===
The promotion history for Suzuki is as follows:

- 6-kyū: 1986
- 4-dan: October 1, 1994
- 5-dan: April 1, 1997
- 6-dan: October 1, 1999
- 7-dan: April 1, 2002
- 8-dan: April 1, 2003
- 9-dan: March 1, 2017

=== Titles and other championships ===
Suzuki has appeared as a challenger in a major title match twice: the 12th Ryūō title (1999) and the 77th Kisei title (2006). He has won two non-major shogi championships during his career: the 15th Hayazashi Shineisen (1996) and the 49th NHK Cup (1999).

=== Awards and honors ===
Suzuki has received a number of Japan Shogi Association Annual Shogi Awards throughout his career. He won the awards for "Best New Player", "Best Winning Percentage" and "Most Consecutive Games Won" in 1996; the "Fighting Spirit Award" in 1999; and the Kōzō Masuda Award in 2004.

=== Year-end prize money and game fee ranking ===
Suzuki has finished in the "Top 10" of the JSA's year-end prize money and game fee rankings twice since 1993: he earned a total of JPY 21,600,000 to rank eighth in 2000, and JPY 22,770,000 to rank eighth in 2006.

== JSA director ==
Suzuki was selected to be an executive director and serve on the Japan Shogi Association's board of directors for a two-year term at the association's 68th General Meeting on May 29, 2017. He was subsequently re-elected to additional two-year terms in June 2019 and June 2021. Suzuki announced in May 2023 that he would not be seeking another term as a JSA board member upon completion of his current term in June 2023.

== Professional mahjong player ==
In addition to being a professional shogi player, Suzuki is also a professional mahjong player. He was awarded professional status by the Japan Professional Mahjong League (JPML) in May 2023; thus becoming the first shogi professional to receive such recognition. Suzuki became interested in mahjong as a hobby while he was an apprentice shogi professional, and participated in a number of tournaments over the years as an amateur. In December 2019, he won the "Celebrity" class (著名人枠, Chomeijin Waku) of the 2019 Mahjong Strongest Player Tournament—one of the largest open majhong tournaments in Japan—to advance to the tournament's final round. In the finals, he defeated a number of professionals to become the overall winner. In 2020, he finished atop of the individual standings for the New Year's All Star Mahjong Tournament (新春オールスター麻雀, Shin'nen Ōru Sutā Mājan), and in 2022, he advance to the finals of the 2022 Mahjong Strongest player tournament (this time after winning the "Former Men's Pro Champion" class (男子プロ王者の帰還枠, Danshi Puro Ōja no Kikan Waku)), but finished second to professional mahjong player Naoki Setokuma. It marked the fourth consecutive year that Suzuki had advanced to the tournament's finals.

Suzuki was awarded the rank of 5-dan by the JPML in June 2023, and is competing as a member of Team Beast Japanext in Japanese professional mahjong's 2023–2024 M.League. He is also competing in Class B2 of the 40th Hō-Ō League.
