= Takashi Abe =

Japanese shogi player

- Native name: 阿部隆
- Born: August 25, 1967 (age 58)
- Hometown: Osaka Prefecture

Career
- Achieved professional status: June 10, 1985 (aged 17)
- Badge Number: 171
- Rank: 9-dan
- Teacher: Kaishū Tanaka (9-dan)
- Tournaments won: 2
- Meijin class: C1
- Ryūō class: 5

Websites
- JSA profile page

Takashi Abe (阿部 隆, Abe Takashi; born August 25, 1967) is a Japanese professional shogi player ranked 9-dan.

== Early life and apprenticeship ==
Takashi Abe was born in Osaka Prefecture on August 25, 1967. Although it was said that Abe was more passionate about "yakyū" than shogi as a young boy, he entered the Japan Shogi Association's apprentice school at the rank of 6-kyū under the guidance of shogi professional Kaishū Tanaka during his second year of junior high school in December 1981. Abe rapidly progressed through the apprentice school, being promoted to the rank of 1-dan in 1983 and then obtaining full professional status and the rank of 4-dan in June 1985, just 3 years and 7 months after becoming an apprentice.

== Shogi professional ==
In 1986, Abe participated in a special three-game match against Yoshiharu Habu called the ""Young Prodigy 3-game Clash" (天才少年激突三番勝負, Tensai Shōnen Gekitotsu Sanban Shōbu), which was a special project pitting the most promising young professional from Western Japan (the 17-year-old Abe) against the most promising young professional from Eastern Japan (the 15-year-old Habu). Even though Abe ended up losing the match, his play received high praise with professional Hirobumi Serizawa even stating that Abe was more talented than Habu.

Abe's first shogi championship as a professional came in 1993 when he defeated Hiroki Nakata 3 games to 2 to win the 12th All Nihon Pro.

Abe's only appearance in a major title match to date came in 2002 when he challenged Habu for the 15th Ryūō title. Abe advanced to the title match by defeating his 12th All Nihon Pro opponent Nakata 2 games to 1 to win the best-of-three challenger playoff. In the title match against Habu, Abe lost the first two games before winning the next three to take a 3 games to 2 lead. Habu, however, went on to win Games 6 and 7 to defend his title.

On August 31, 2007, Abe defeated Keita Inoue in a Meijin Class B1 ranking game to become the 34th shogi professional to win 600 official games.

Abe became the 22nd professional to win 800 official games when he defeated Yasuaki Murayama in a 68th Ōza tournament preliminary round game on January 30, 2020. He was awarded the "Shogi Honor Fighting-spirit Award" as a result, and become the first player to receive the award while still currently ranked 8-dan.

=== Promotion history ===
The promotion history for Abe is as follows:

- 6-kyū: 1981
- 1-dan: 1983
- 4-dan: June 10, 1985
- 5-dan: August 11, 1989
- 6-dan: November 16, 1992
- 7-dan: June 6, 1997
- 8-dan: February 16, 2005
- 9-dan: July 15, 2020

=== Titles and other championships ===
Abe's only appearance in a major title match was in 2002 when he was the challenger for the Ryūō title. Abe has won two non-major shogi championships during his career: the 12th All Nihon Pro (1993) and the 20th All Star Kachinuki-sen (1999–2000).

=== Awards and honors ===
Abe received the Japan Shogi Association Annual Shogi Awards for "Most Games Won" and "Most Games Played" in 1996. In addition, Abe received the JSA's "Shogi Honor Award" in 2007 for winning 600 games as a professional, the "25 Years Service Award" in 2010 for being an active professional for 25 years, and the "Shogi Honor Fighting-spirit Award" in 2020 for winning 800 games as a professional.

=== Year-end prize money and game fee ranking ===
Abe has finished in the "Top 10" of the JSA's year-end prize money and game fee rankings three times since 1993: he earned a total of JPY 24,780,000 to rank seventh in 1994, JPY 25,630,000 to rank ninth in 2002 and JPY 20,490,000 to rank eighth in 2003.
