= Shōta Chida =

Japanese shogi player (born 1994)

- Native name: 千田翔太
- Born: April 10, 1994 (age 32)
- Hometown: Minoh, Osaka

Career
- Achieved professional status: April 1, 2013 (aged 18)
- Badge number: 291
- Rank: 8-dan
- Teacher: Nobuo Mori (7-dan)
- Tournaments won: 1
- Meijin class: A
- Ryūō class: 3

Websites
- JSA profile page
- Official website

Shōta Chida (千田 翔太, Chida Shōta; born April 10, 1994) is a Japanese professional shogi player, ranked 8-dan. Chida is known for his novel research into shogi opening theory using computer shogi engines.

== Early life and apprenticeship ==
Shōta Chida was born on April 10, 1994, in Minoh, Osaka. He learned how to play shogi from an elementary school student living in the same neighborhood when he was five years old.

In September 2006, Chida was accepted into the Japanese Shogi Association's apprentice school at the rank of 6-kyū as student of shogi professional Nobuo Mori, and was promoted to the rank of 3-dan in April 2010. Chida obtained full professional status and the rank of 4-dan in April 2013 when he was an 18-year-old third-grade student at Osaka Prefectural Toneyama High School by winning the 52nd 3-dan League (October 2012 – March 2013) with a record of 15 wins and 3 losses.

== Shogi professional ==
In October 2013, Chida advanced to the finals of the 3rd Kakogawa Seiryū Tournament against Yūki Sasaki, but lost 2 games to 1.

In March 2016, Chida advanced to the finals of the 65th NHK Cup Shogi TV Tournament, but was defeated by Yasuaki Murayama.

In December 2016, Chida faced Sasaki once again and this time defeated him to earn the right to challenge Akira Watanabe for the 42nd Kiō Title. In the best-of-five title match held in February and March 2017, Chida was leading 2 games to 1 after winning Game 3, but Watanabe retained his title by winning the last two games. Also in December 2016, Chida advanced to the final of the 2nd Eiō Tournament, but lost to Amahiko Satō 2 games to none.

In February 2020, Chida defeated Takuya Nagase 2-crown to win the 13th Asahi Cup Open. Chida advanced to the final by defeating Sōta Fujii earlier in the day to end Fujii’s bid who to become only the second player to win the tournament three years in a row. The victory was Chida’s first tournament championship as a professional.

=== Promotion history ===
The promotion history for Chida is as follows:

- 6-kyū: September 2006
- 3-dan: April 2010
- 4-dan: April 1, 2013
- 5-dan: February 12, 2015
- 6-dan: December 16, 2016
- 7-dan: March 13, 2019
- 8-dan: February 8, 2024

=== Titles and other championships ===
Chida's only appearance in a major title match was in 2017 when he was the challenger for the Kiō title. He has, however, won one non-major title tournament: the 13th Asahi Cup Open in 2020.

=== Awards and honors ===
Chida has received a number of Japan Shogi Association Annual Shogi Awards during career. He won the award for "Best New Player" for 2014–15 as well as the awards for "Most Games Won", "Most Games Played", the Masuda Award for 2016–17 and the Masuda Award for 2021–2021. His "Masuda Award" for 2016–2017 was for his development of Bishop Exchange Reclining Silver variations with King-42/Gold-62/Rook-81 and Rapid Attack Left Mino strategies against Yagura.

=== Year-end prize money and game fee ranking ===
Chida has finished in the "Top 10" of the JSA's year-end prize money and game fee rankings once since turning professional: 10th place with JPY 16,920,000 in earnings in 2020.

== Personal life ==
Chiba is married to women's professional shogi player Marika Nakamura. The pair got married in September 2023. In September 2025, the couple's first child, a daughter, was born.
