= Bungo Fukusaki =

Japanese professional shogi player

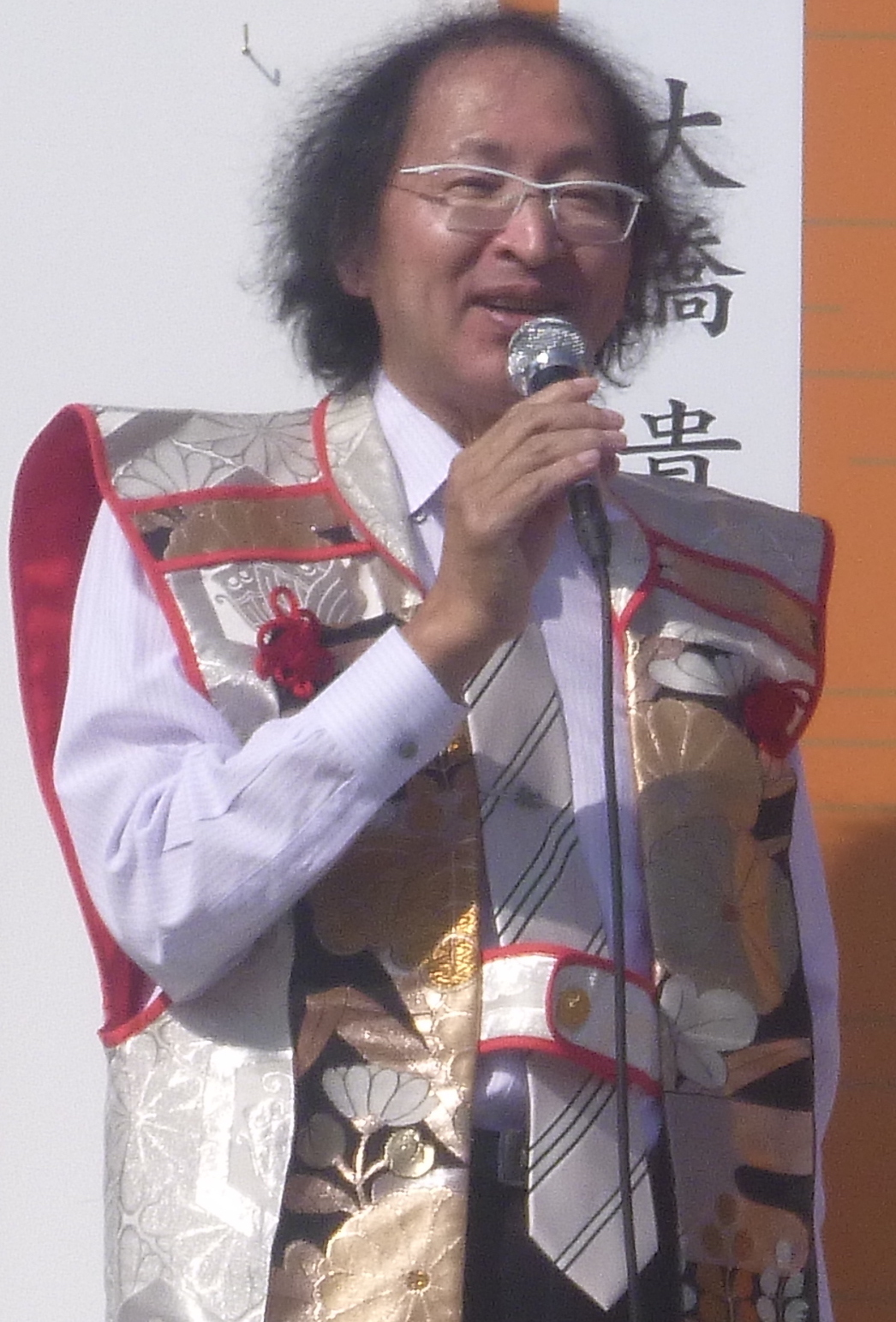
- Bungo Fukusaki in Himeji, Japan (November 11, 2018)
- Native name: 福崎文吾
- Born: December 6, 1959 (age 65)
- Hometown: Moriguchi, Osaka

Career
- Achieved professional status: October 1, 1978 (aged 18)
- Badge Number: 135
- Rank: 9-dan
- Retired: April 22, 2025 (aged 65)
- Teacher: Kaishū Tanaka (9-dan)
- Major titles won: 2
- Tournaments won: 1
- Career record: 678–814 (.454)

Websites
- JSA profile page

Bungo Fukusaki (福崎 文吾, Fukusaki Bungo; December 6, 1959) is a Japanese retired professional shogi player who achieved the rank of 9-dan. He is a former 10-dan and Ōza major title holder.

== Early life ==
Fukusaki was born on December 6, 1959, in Moriguchi, Osaka. He entered the Japan Shogi Association's apprentice school under the guidance of shogi professional Kaishū Tanaka at the rank of 5-kyū in 1975. He was promoted to 1-dan in 1976 and obtained full professional status and the rank of 4-dan in October 1978.

== Shogi professional ==
In 1979, Fukusaki won the 3rd Young Lions tournament for his first championship as a professional.

Fukusaki first appearance in a major title match came in 1986 when he challenged Kunio Yonenaga for the 25th 10 dan title. Fukusaki won the match 4 games to 2 for his first major title. The following year, however, he was unsuccessful in his first title match defense, losing to Michio Takahashi 4 games to none.

Fukusaki's next appearance in a major title match came in 1991 when he challenged Kōji Tanigawa for the 39th Ōza title. Fukusaki defeated Tanigawa 3 games to 2, but once again was unable to defend his title the following year, this time losing to Yoshiharu Habu.

On March 8, 2012, Fukusaki defeated Kenji Kobayashi in a Ryūō Class 4 game to become the 44th professional to win 600 official games.

On April 1, 2025, the JSA announced Fukuzaki had met the conditions for mandatory retirement for "Free Class" players and his retirement would become official upon completion of his final scheduled game of the 2025–2024 shogi season. Fukuzaki's retirement became official upon losing to Kōzō Arimori on April 22, 2025, in a 38th Ryūō Group 6 game. He finished his career with a record of 678 wins and 814 losses for a winning percentage of 0.454.

=== Promotion history ===
Fukusaki's promotion history is as follows:

- 5-kyū: 1975
- 1-dan: 1976
- 4-dan: October 11, 1978
- 5-dan: April 1, 1980
- 6-dan: April 1, 1981
- 7-dan: April 1, 1982
- 8-dan: May 26, 1990
- 9-dan: October 28, 2005
- Retired: April 22, 2025

=== Titles and other championships ===
Fukusaki has appeared in major title matches a total of four times and has won two titles. In addition to major titles, Fukusaki has won one other shogi championship during his career.

=== Awards and honors ===
Fukusaki received the Japan Shogi Association Annual Shogi Awards for "Best New Player" and "Best Winning Percentage" in 1979, and for "Distinguished Service" in 1986. He also received the association's "25 Years Service Award" in 2003 in recognition of being an active professional for twenty-five years, and the "Shogi Honor Award" in 2008 in recognition of winning 600 official games as a professional.

== Personal life ==
Fukusaki is married to former female shogi professional Mutsumi Fukusaki.
