= Toshiyuki Nakao =

Japanese shogi player

- Native name: 中尾敏之
- Born: October 24, 1974 (age 50)
- Hometown: Fuji, Shizuoka
- Nationality: Japanese

Career
- Achieved professional status: October 1, 1998 (aged 23)
- Badge Number: 230
- Rank: 6 dan
- Retired: August 13, 2018 (aged 43)
- Teacher: Hisao Hirotsu
- Career record: 186–260 (.417)

Websites
- JSA profile page

Toshiyuki Nakao (中尾 敏之, Nakao Toshiyuki; born October 24, 1974) is a Japanese retired professional shogi player who achieved the rank of 5-dan.

== Early life and apprenticeship ==
Nakao was born on October 24, 1974, in Fuji, Shizuoka. He learned how to play shogi from his father when he was an elementary school first grade student. As a third grade junior high school student, Nakano entered the Japan Shogi Association's apprentice professional school in September 1989 at the rank of 6-kyū under the tutelage of shogi professional Hisao Hirotsu, and was awarded regular professional status and the rank of 4-dan on October 1, 1998 after finishing second behind Shin'ya Yamamoto in the 23rd Apprentice School 3-dan League (April 1998 – September 1998) with a record of 12 wins and 6 losses.

== Shogi professional ==
Nakao retired from professional shogi on August 13, 2018. His career record was 186 wins and 260 losses for a winning percentage of 0.417.

=== Promotion history ===
The promotion history for Nakao was as follows:

- 6-kyū: 1989
- 1-dan: 1993
- 4-dan: October 1, 1998
- 5-dan: May 9, 2007
- Retired: August 13, 2019
- 6-dan: April 1, 2019

=== Awards and honors ===
Nakao received the JSA's Annual Shogi Award "Game of the Year Special Prize" (April 2017 – March 2018 shogi year) in April 2018 for his game against Mitsunori Makino.
