= Tadahisa Maruyama =

Japanese shogi player (born 1970)

- Native name: 丸山忠久
- Born: September 5, 1970 (age 55)
- Hometown: Kisarazu

Career
- Achieved professional status: April 1, 1990 (aged 19)
- Badge Number: 194
- Rank: 9-dan
- Teacher: Yūji Sase (Honorary 9-dan)
- Major titles won: 3
- Tournaments won: 15
- Meijin class: B2
- Ryūō class: 1

Websites
- JSA profile page

Tadahisa Maruyama (丸山 忠久, Maruyama Tadahisa; born September 5, 1970) is a Japanese professional shogi player ranked 9-dan. He is a former Meijin and Kiō title holder.

== Early life, amateur shogi and apprenticeship ==
Maruyama was born in Kisarazu, Chiba on September 5, 1970. He won the 9th Junior High School Student Shogi Meijin Tournament in 1984, and the following year entered the Japan Shogi Association's apprentice school at the rank of 6-kyū as a protegee of shogi professional Yūji Sase. He was promoted to the rank of 1-dan in 1986 and achieved professional status and the rank of 4-dan in April 1990.

== Shogi professional ==
Maruyama's first tournament championship as a professional came in came in 1994 when he defeated Masataka Gōda 2 games to none to win the 25th Shinjin-Ō tournament. Maruyama successfully defended his championship the following year by defeating Kōichi Fukaura 2 games to 1 in the 26th Shinjin-Ō match which made him the first person to win the tournament in consecutive years. Maruyama, however, was unable to repeat his success for a third consecutive year when he lost the 27th Shinjin-Ō match 2 games to 1 to Takeshi Fujii in 1996.

Maruyama's first appearance in a major title match came in 1999 when he challenged Yoshiharu Habu for the 47th Ōza title. Maruyama lost the match 3 games to 1.

On December 8, 2023, Maruyama became the tenth professional shogi player overall and the first since July 2017 to reach 1000 wins in official games when he defeated Kōichi Fukaura in a Eiō tournament preliminary round game. Maruyama qualified for the JSA's "Special Shogi Honor Award" for reaching this milestone. His career record at the time of the victory was 1000 wins and 600 losses for a winning percentage of 0.625. That same month, Maruyama defeated Sōta Fujii to win the 31st Ginga tournament. The victory gave Maruyama his first Ginga Tournament championship, and it also was the first defeat for Fujii in a tournament final since obtaining 8-crown status in September 2023. The championship game was actually played on November 1, 2023, but the final result was not made public until the game was broadcast on December 23.

In December 2024, Maruyama defeated Hisashi Namekata to win the 2nd Tatsujin Tournament. That same month the final of the 32nd Ginga tournament between Maruyama and Fujii was broadcast (the actual game was played in September 2024), and Maruyama won for the second year in a row to repeat as Ginga champion.

=== Theoretical contributions ===
Maruyama invented the Maruyama Vaccine (丸山ワクチン (Maruyama Wakuchin)) variation for Static Rook positions playing against Cheerful Central Rook opponents.

=== Promotion history ===
The promotion history for Maruyama is as follows:

- 6-kyū: 1985
- 1-dan: 1986
- 4-dan: April 1, 1990
- 5-dan: April 1, 1992
- 6-dan: April 1, 1995
- 7-dan: April 1, 1997
- 8-dan: April 1, 1998
- 9-dan: June 28, 2000

=== Titles and other championships ===
Maruyama has appeared in major title matches a total of ten times and has won three major titles. In addition to major titles, he has won fourteen other shogi championships during his career.

==== Major titles ====
Title	Years	Number of times
Meijin	2000–01	2
Kiō	2002	1

==== Other championships ====
Tournament	Years	Number of times
^{*}All Nihon Pro	1998	1
Nihon Series	1999, 2001	2
^{*}All Star Kachinuki-sen	1992, 1994 1999, 2001	4
Shinjin-Ō	1994–95	2
^{*}Hayazashi Senshuken	2000–01	2
NHK Cup	2005	1
Ginga tournament	2023–24	2
Tatsujin Tournament	2024	1

Note: Tournaments marked with an asterisk (*) are no longer held.

=== Awards and honors ===
Maruyama has received a number of awards and honors throughout his career for his accomplishments both on an off the shogi board. These include the Annual Shogi Awards given out by the JSA for performance in official games as well as other JSA awards for career accomplishments, and awards received from governmental organizations, etc. for contributions made to Japanese society.

==== Annual Shogi Awards ====
- 22nd Annual Awards (April 1994 – March 1995): Best New Player, Most Consecutive Games Won
- 23rd Annual Awards (April 1995 – March 1996): Most Games Won, Most Consecutive Games Won
- 27th Annual Awards (April 1999 – March 2000): Most Games Won, Most Games Played, Most Consecutive Games Won, Technique Award
- 28th Annual Awards (April 2000 – March 2001): Distinguished Service Award
- 30th Annual Awards (April 2002 – March 2003): Distinguished Service Award
- 39th Annual Awards (April 2011 – March 2012): Game of the Year
- 46th Annual Awards (April 2018 – March 2019): Masuda Special Prize
- 51st Annual Shogi Awards (April 2023 – March 2024): Fighting Spirit

==== Other awards ====
- 2000, November: Kisarazu City Meritorius Citizen Award
- 2007: Shogi Honor Fighting-spirit Award (Awarded by JSA in recognition of winning 600 official games as a professional)
- 2014: Shogi Honor Fighting-spirit Award (Awarded by JSA in recognition of winning 800 official games as a professional)
- 2015: 25 Years Service Award (Awarded by the JSA in recognition of being an active professional for twenty-five years)
- 2023: Special Shogi Honor Award (Awarded by the JSA in recognition of winning 1000 official games as a professional)

=== Year-end prize money and game fee ranking ===
Maruyama has finished in the "Top 10" of the JSA's year-end prize money and game fee rankings seventeen times since 1993. His highest finish was third in 2001 with in JPY 57,270,000 in earnings.

Year	Amount	Rank
1998	¥20,590,000	10th
1999	¥52,280,000	5th
2000	¥41,370,000	5th
2001	¥57,270,000	3rd
2002	¥44,050,000	4th
2003	¥37,450,000	5th
2004	¥27,850,000	5th
2006	¥31,160,000	6th
2007	¥19,530,000	10th
2008	¥25,440,000	7th
2010	¥23,720,000	9th
2011	¥26,430,000	5th
2012	¥34,090,000	4th
2013	¥29,120,000	5th
2016	¥22,100,000	8th
2017	¥29,080,000	5th
2020	\19,260,000	9th
