= Amahiko Satō =

Japanese shogi player (born 1988)

- Born: January 16, 1988 (age 38)
- Hometown: Fukuoka

Career
- Achieved professional status: April 1, 2010 (aged 22)
- Badge number: 263
- Rank: 9 dan
- Teacher: Isao Nakata
- Major titles won: 3
- Tournaments won: 3
- Meijin class: A
- Ryūō class: 2

Websites
- JSA profile page
- Amahiko Satō on X

Amahiko Satō (佐藤 天彦, Satō Amahiko; born January 16, 1988) is a Japanese professional shogi player, ranked 9-dan. He is a former Meijin title holder.

== Early life and apprentice shogi professional ==
Satō was born in Fukuoka on January 18, 1988. He attended elementary school and junior high school in Fukuoka, but moved to Chiba Prefecture to attend senior high school.

He entered the Japanese Shogi Association's apprentice school in September 1998 when he was in the fifth-grade under the guidance of shogi professional Isao Nakata, who is also from Fukuoka and began giving Satō guidance online.

== Shogi professional ==
Satō's first tournament victory as a professional came in September 2008 when he defeated Yoshitaka Hoshino 2 games to none to win the 39th Shinjin-Ō tournament. He won the same tournament in October 2011 when he defeated Masayuki Toyoshima 2 games to 1 to win the 42nd Shinjin-Ō tournament.

In July 2015, Satō defeated Toyoshima once again, this time in the 63rd Ōza title challenger tournament final, to advance to his first major title match. In the best-of-five final against defending champion Yoshiharu Habu, Sato was leading the match 2 games to 1 before Habu came back to win the last two games and defend his title.

Satō's next appearance in a major title match came in February 2016 when he challenged Akira Watanabe for the 41st Kiō title. Satō advanced to the title match by defeating Yasumitsu Satō 2 games to none in the final of the challenger tournament, but ended up losing to Watanabe 3 games to 1.

In May 2016, Satō won his first major title when he defeated Habu 4 games to 1 win the 74th Meijin title. Satō advanced to the Meijin title match by winning the Meijin Class A ranking league in his first season in the league. Satō successfully defended his Meijin title in 2017 by defeating Akira Inaba (75th Meijin Match: 4 games to 2) and in 2018 by defeating Habu (76th Meijin Match: 4 games to 2). In each of these title defenses, Satō lost two of the first three games before coming back to win the match.

In December 2016, Satō defeated Shōta Chida 2 games to none to win the 2nd Eiō Tournament. The victory meant that Satō qualified to play the winner of a tournament involving top computer shogi programs in a two-game match the following Spring. Sato lost both games of the match held in April–May 2017 to the program Ponanza.

Satō defeated Hisashi Namekata to win the 26th Ginga Tournament in September 2018.

Satō was unable to defend his Meijin title for the third consecutive time, losing the 77th Meijin Match (April–May 2019) to challenger Toyoshima 2-crown 4 games to none.

=== Disqualification for violating rules regarding masks ===
In October 2022, Satō became the first shogi professional to be disqualified during an official game for non-compliance with the JSA's rules regarding the wearing of face masks. In February 2022, the JSA instituted new provisional rules for official game play that had previously only been recommended practices in response to the COVID-19 pandemic in Japan. These rules required players to properly wear a face mask during official games, except when eating, drinking or other instances where masks may be allowed to be removed for short-periods of time. On October 28, 2022, Satō's Meijin Class A ranking league game against Takuya Nagase started around 11 a.m. with both players wearing face masks as required; however, as the game continued on into the late evening, Satō left his mask hanging from one ear for roughly 30 minutes while concentrating on the game. Since there was no referee present monitoring game play at the time, Nagase left the playing room to seek further assistance. After discussing the matter, JSA President Yasumitsu Satō and JSA Executive Director Daisuke Suzuki notified Satō that he was disqualified for a failure to wear a mask and the game was declared a win for Nagase. Satō unhappy with this result claimed his removal of the mask was unintentional and that he should have been warned before being disqualified, but his protest was denied. Satō was advised that he could submit a formal grievance in writing about the matter if he was unwilling to accept the decision. Satō submitted such a grievance on November 1, 2022, stating that he apologized for what happened but also that the JSA's response was excessive and that he should have been warned first. He also requested that the disqualification ruling be overturned and the game be replayed. The JSA accepted Sato's grievance and it was discussed by the JSA's board of directors. After assessing Satō's grievance as well as its response, the JSA released a statement on its official website on January 13, 2023, in which it stated the actions of President Satō and Executive Director Suzuki had been appropriate and that the disqualification result would stand.

=== Promotion history ===
The promotion history for Satō is as follows:

- 6-kyū: September 1998
- 4-dan: October 1, 2006
- 5-dan: April 30, 2009
- 6-dan: April 21, 2011
- 7-dan: April 19, 2012
- 8-dan: January 8, 2015
- 9-dan: May 31, 2016

=== Titles and other championships ===
Satō has appeared in major title matches a total of six times. He has won the Meijin title three times. In addition to major titles, Satō has won four other shogi championships during his career: the Shinjin-Ō (2008 and 2011), the Eiō Tournament (2016), and the Ginga Tournament (2018).

=== Awards and honors ===
Satō has received a number of Japan Shogi Association Annual Shogi Awards throughout his career. He won the "Best New Player" award in 2008; the "Best Winning Percentage" and "Most Consecutive Games Won" awards in 2010; the "Most Games Won", "Most Games Played", "Most Consecutive Games Won", "Game of the Year", and "Fighting-spirit" awards in 2015; the "Fighting-spirit" award in 2016; the "Game of the Year" in 2019; and the Masuda Award in 2024.

In addition to awards for shogi, Satō was selected as one of GQ Japan's "Men of the Year" for 2017. Sato won the "Boom" award.

=== Year-end prize money and game fee ranking ===
Satō has finished in the "Top 10" of the JSA's year-end prize money and game fee rankings six times: 6th place with JPY 21,660,000 in earnings for 2015; 3rd place with JPY 57,220,000 in earnings for 2016; 2nd place with JPY 72,550,000 in earnings in 2017; 2nd place with JPY 59,990,000 in earnings in 2018; 6th place with JPY 36,870,00 in earnings in 2019. and 8th place with JPY 18,190,000 in earnings for 2022.
