= Akihito Hirose =

Japanese shogi player (born 1987)

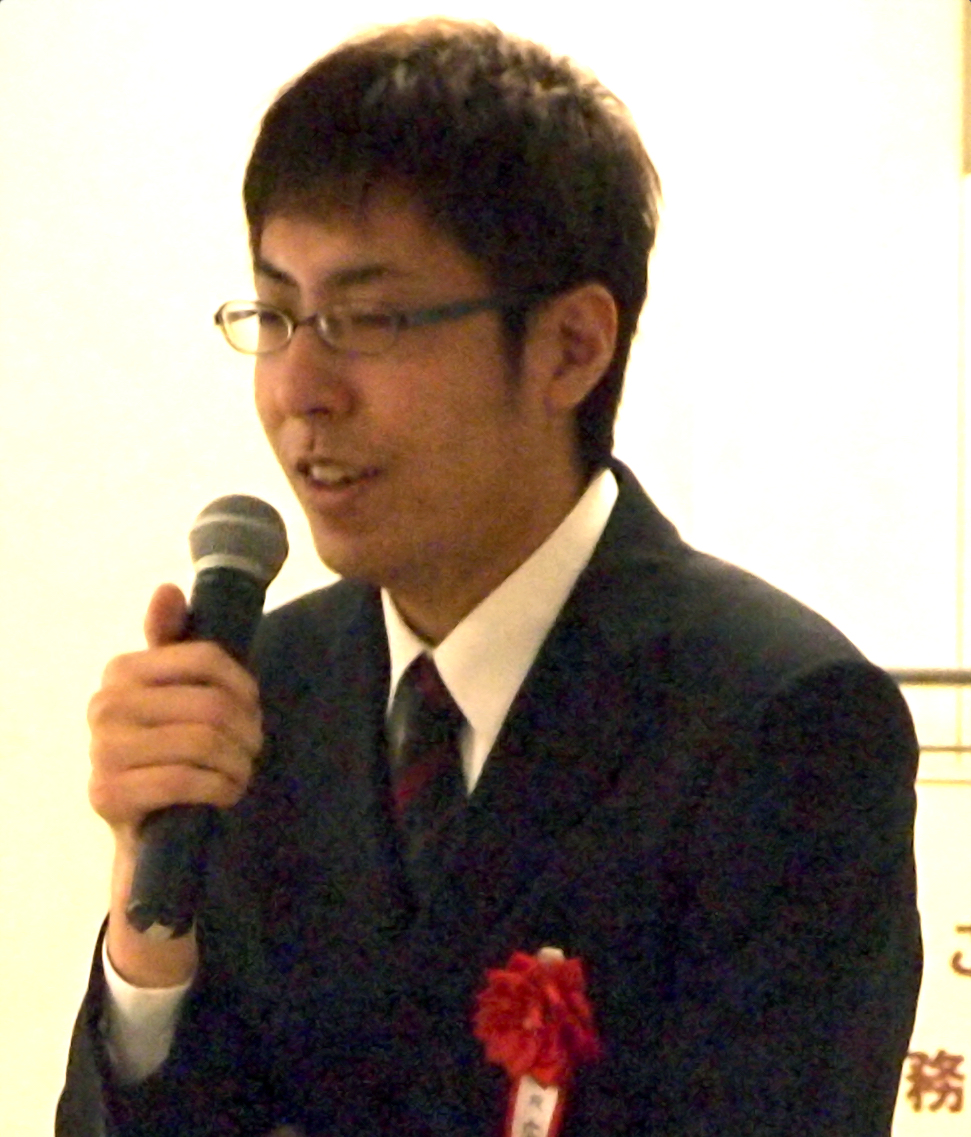
- Native name: 広瀬章人
- Born: January 18, 1987 (age 39)
- Hometown: Sapporo

Career
- Achieved professional status: April 1, 2005 (aged 18)
- Badge number: 255
- Rank: 9-dan
- Teacher: Osamu Katsuura (9-dan)
- Current titles held: Ōza
- Major titles won: 3
- Tournaments won: 1
- Meijin class: A
- Ryūō class: 1
- Notable students: Taiki Yamakawa

Websites
- JSA profile page
- Official website

Akihito Hirose (広瀬 章人, Hirose Akihito; born January 18, 1987) is a Japanese professional shogi player, ranked 9-dan. He is the current holder of the Ōza title and a former holder of the Ryūō and Ōi titles. He is also the first shogi professional to win a major title while still attending university.

== Early life, education and apprenticeship ==
Hirose was born in Kōtō, Tokyo on January 18, 1987. He first started playing shogi around the age of four because his father and older brother played the game. His family moved to Sapporo, Hokkaido due to his father's job and he lived there from elementary school grades three through six.

While living in Sapporo, Hirose began studying under some members of the Hokkaido Shogi Association and polishing his skills at local shogi clubs before officially entering the Japan Shogi Association's apprentice school at the rank of 6-kyū as protegee of shogi professional Osamu Katsuura in 1998 while he was a sixth-grade elementary student. For roughly his first year as a shogi apprentice, Hirose commuted by plane twice monthly from Sapporo to the Japan Shogi Association's headquarters in Tokyo to play games against other apprentices.

Hirose was promoted to the rank of 1-dan in 2000, and was officially awarded professional status in April 2005 for winning the 36th 3-dan League with a record of 15 wins and 3 losses.

Hirose graduated from Tokyo Seitoku University High School in March 2005 and decided to continue his education by enrolling in the School of Education of Waseda University and majoring in mathematics. This was quite rare for a professional shogi player to do, but Hirose stated "he wanted to experience many things in addition to shogi" and also wanted to be like his friends who were all moving on to university. Hirose graduated from Waseda in 2011.

== Shogi professional ==
In 2009, Hirose defeated Taichi Nakamura two games to none to win the 40th Shinjin-Ō for his first non-title tournament victory as a professional. The match was billed as the "Battle of Waseda University Students" because both Hirose and Nakamura were attending Waseda University at the time.

Hirose's first major title appearance came in 2010 when defeated Yoshiharu Habu to earn the right to challenge Kōichi Fukaura for the 51st Ōi title. Hirose went on to defeat Fukaura 4 games to 2 to not only win a major title in his first attempt, but to also become the first shogi professional to win a major title while attending university. He was, however, unable to defend his title the following year against challenger Habu, losing the 52nd Ōi match 4 games to 3. Hirose was leading the match 3 games to 2 after winning Game 5, but was unable to get the fourth win needed to retain his title.

In 2015, Hirose defeated Tatsuya Sugai in the playoff to determine who would challenge Habu for the 56th Ōi title, but ended up losing to Habu 4 games to 1.

In September 2018, Hirose defeated Fukaura 2 games to 1 to win the 31st Ryūō Challenger Match and advance to the title match against defending champion Habu. In the title match against Habu, Hirose lost Games 1, 2 and 5 to trail the match 3 games to 2 before coming back to win the last two games and take the title from Habu.

After twice defeating reigning Meijin Amahiko Satō, Hirose challenged Akira Watanabe in the 44th Kiō title match from February – March 2019. However, Hirose ended up losing to Watanabe 3 games to 1.

Hirose advanced to the finals of JT Nihon Series tournament for the first time in November 2019, but was defeated by defending tournament champion Watanabe in the 40th JT Cup championship on November 17, 2019. A few days later, however, Hirose earned the right to challenge Watanabe for the 69th Ōshō title when he defeated Sōta Fujii in the final game of the Ōshō tournament challenger league to finish league play with 5 wins and 1 loss. In January – March 2020 69th Ōshō title match, Hirose was leading the match 3 games to 2 before Watanabe came back to win the last two games and defend his title.

In the 32nd Ryūō title match (October–December 2019), Hirose defended his title against challenger Masayuki Toyoshima, the reigning Meijin title holder. Hirose lost the first three games of the match and was never able to recover, losing the match 4 games to 1.

Hirose challenged Sōta Fujii in the 35th Ryūō title match (October–December 2022). Although Hirose won Game 1, he ended up losing the match 4 games to 2.

In August 2026, Hirose defeated Fujii in the finals of the challenger determination tournament for the 74th Ōza tournamet to earn the right to challenge reigning Ōza title holder Takumi Itō. In the best-of-five 74th Ōza title match (September–October 2026), Hirose was behind 2 games to 1 after losing Game 3 but won the next two games to win the match and capture the Ōza title for the first time.

=== Promotion history ===
Hirose's promotion history is as follows:

- 6-kyū: 1998
- 1-dan: 2000
- 4-dan: April 1, 2005
- 5-dan: April 1, 2007
- 6-dan: June 11, 2010
- 7-dan: September 2, 2010
- 8-dan: February 13, 2014
- 9-dan: November 16, 2023

=== Titles and other championships ===
Hirose has appeared in a major title match nine times, and has won three titles. In addition to major titles, Hirose has won one other shogi championship.

=== Awards and honors ===
Hirose received the JSA's Annual Shogi Awards for "Fighting-spirit" in 2010 and 2018, "Game of the Year" in 2010 and “Special Game of the Year” in 2019.

=== Year-end prize money and game fee ranking ===
Hirose has finished in the "Top 10" of the JSA's year-end prize money/game fee rankings nine times since turning professional: tenth in 2010 with JPY 21,360,000 in earnings; eighth in 2011 with JPY 20,005,000 in earnings; tenth in 2015 with JPY 20,420,000 in earnings; fifth in 2018 with JPY 28,020,000 in earnings; second in 2019 with JPY 69,840,000 in earnings; fifth with JPY 32,410,000 in earnings in 2020; sixth with JPY 21,660,000 in earnings in 2022; fourth with JPY 30,660,000 in earnings in 2023. and sixth with JPY 24,610,000 in earnings in 2024.
