= Taichi Nakamura (shogi) =

Japanese shogi player

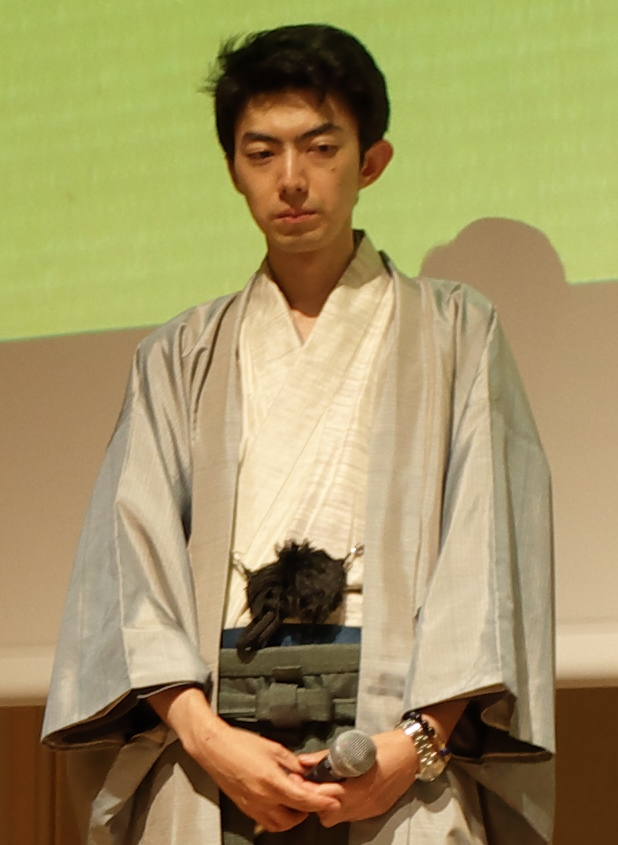
- Nakamura after Game 3 of the 66th Ōza title match
- Born: June 1, 1988 (age 38)
- Hometown: Fuchū, Tokyo

Career
- Achieved professional status: April 1, 2006 (aged 17)
- Badge number: 261
- Rank: 8-dan
- Teacher: Kunio Yonenaga (9-dan)
- Major titles won: 1
- Meijin class: B1
- Ryūō class: 5
- Notable students: Hanae Ono

Websites
- JSA profile page

Taichi Nakamura (中村 太地, Nakamura Taichi; born June 1, 1988) is a Japanese professional shogi player, ranked 8-dan. He is a former holder of the Ōza title. He is also a non-executive director of the Japan Shogi Association.

== Early life, amateur shogi and apprenticeship ==
Taichi Nakamura was born in Fuchū, Tokyo on June 1, 1988. As a young boy, his family moved a lot due to his father's work. He learned how to play shogi as a four-year-old while living in Sapporo, Hokkaido, but first became interested in becoming a professional shogi player after hearing the news of Yoshiharu Habu becoming the first "7-crown" in professional shogi history. After Nakamura's family moved back to Tokyo when he was a second-grade elementary school student, he started practicing shogi at the well-known Hachioji Shogi Club where Habu also studied as a young boy.

In 2000, Nakamura advanced to the championship game of the 25th Elementary School Student Meijin Tournament, but finished runner-up after losing to fellow future shogi professional Ryūma Tonari. In September of that same year, Nakamura was accepted in the Japan Shogi Association's apprentice school at the rank of 6-kyū under the tutelage of shogi professional Kunio Yonenaga.

In April 2006, Nakamura was officially awarded professional status in April 2006 for finishing second in the 38th 3-dan league with a record of 13 wins and 5 losses. Nakamura was still a 12th grade senior high school student at Waseda Jitsugyō High School (an affiliate school of Waseda University) at the time.

After graduating from high school in March 2007, Nakamura enrolled in Waseda University's School of Political Science and Economics to continue his education in addition to being a shogi professional. In March 2010, Nakamura wrote a thesis about political parties and unaffiliated voters in Japan which won him a scholarship from the School of Political Science and Economics. Nakamura graduated from Waseda in 2011.

== Shogi professional ==
When Nakamura faced Akihito Hirose in the championship match of the 40th Shinjin-Ō tournament in 2009, the match was billed as the "Battle of Waseda University Students" because the two were attending Waseda University at the time. Nakamura lost the match 2 games to none.

Nakamura's first appearance in a major title match came in 2012 when he challenged Yoshiharu Habu for the 83rd Kisei title. Nakamura lost the match 3 games to none. In 2013, Nakamura defeated Masataka Gōda in the final of the challenger tournament of the 61st Ōza tournament to earn the right to challenge Habu for the title. Nakamura was leading the match 2 games to 1 after three games, but Habu was able to defend his title by winning the last two games.

In 2017, Nakamura advance to the 65th Ōza title match to once again challenge Habu for a major title. As in 2013, Nakamura was leading the match 2 games to 1, but this time won Game 4 to win the match 3 games to 1 and also capture his first major title. Nakamura, however, was unable to defend his title in 2018, losing the 66th Ōza title match 3 games to 2 to Shintarō Saitō.

=== Promotion history ===
The promotion history for Nakamura is as follows:

- 6-kyū: September 2000
- 4-dan: April 1, 2006
- 5-dan: January 27, 2011
- 6-dan: April 26, 2012
- 7-dan: October 11, 2017
- 8-dan: March 9, 2023

=== Titles and other championships ===
Nakamura has appeared in major title matches a total of four times and has won once.

=== Awards and honors ===
Nakamura received the Japan Shogi Association Annual Shogi Awards for "Best Winning Percentage" in 2011, "Fighting-spirit" and "Most Consecutive Games Won" in 2012, and "Game of the Year" in 2013.

=== Year-end prize money and game fee ranking ===
Nakamura has finished in the "Top 10" of the JSA's year-end prize money and game fee rankings once: he finished 8th with JPY 21,440,000 in earnings in 2017.

== JSA director ==
Nakamura was elected a non-executive director of the JSA at its 76th General Meeting in June 2025.
