= Makoto Sasaki (shogi) =

Japanese shogi player

- Native name: 佐々木慎
- Born: January 21, 1980 (age 46)
- Hometown: Nakano, Tokyo

Career
- Achieved professional status: April 1, 2001 (aged 21)
- Badge Number: 240
- Rank: 7-dan
- Teacher: Shigeru Sekine (9-dan)
- Meijin class: B2
- Ryūō class: 2

Websites
- JSA profile page
- Official website

Makoto Sasaki (佐々木 慎, Sasaki Makoto; born January 21, 1980) is a Japanese professional shogi player ranked 7-dan.

== Shogi professional ==
=== Promotion history ===
The promotion history for Sasaki is as follows:

- 6-kyū: 1993
- 1-dan: 1997
- 4-dan: April 1, 2001
- 5-dan: April 19, 2006
- 6-dan: February 22, 2012
- 7-dan: March 11, 2020

=== Awards and honors ===
Sasaki received the Japan Shogi Association's 35th Annual Shogi Award for "Most Consecutive Games Won" for the 2007–8 season.
