= Kōichi Kodama =

Japanese shogi player (born 1951)

- Native name: 児玉孝一
- Born: February 21, 1951 (age 75)
- Hometown: Kitakyushu, Fukuoka Prefecture
- Nationality: Japanese

Career
- Achieved professional status: July 7, 1980 (aged 29)
- Badge number: 141
- Rank: 8 dan
- Retired: August 10, 2011 (aged 60)
- Teacher: Shimei Okazaki
- Career record: 394–526 (.428)

Websites
- JSA profile page

Kōichi Kodama (児玉 孝一, Kodama Kōichi; born February 21, 1951) is a Japanese retired professional shogi player who achieved the rank of 8-dan.

== Early life, amateur shogi and apprentice professional ==
Kōichi Kodama was born in Kitakyushu, Fukuoka Prefecture on February 21, 1951. As a high school student, he was a member of a Fukuoka Prefectural Yahata Chuo High School team that won the team competition of the 4th All Japan Senior High School Shogi Championship in 1968, and later went on to represent Fukuoka Prefecture in the Amateur Meijin Tournament.

In October 1971, Kodama was accepted into the Japan Shogi Association's apprentice school at the rank of 3-kyū under the guidance of shogi professional Shimei Okazaki. He was promoted to the rank of 1-dan in 1974 and finally obtained full professional status and the rank of 4-dan in January 1980.

== Shogi professional ==
=== Promotion history ===
Kodama's promotion history is as follows:

- 3-kyū: 1971
- 1-dan: 1974
- 4-dan: January 7, 1980
- 5-dan: April 1, 1983
- 6-dan: April 1, 1985
- 7-dan: January 18, 1996
- Retired: August 10, 2011
- 2016, April 1: 8-dan

=== Awards and honors ===
Kodama received the following Japan Shogi Association Annual Shogi Awards during his career: the Kōzō Masuda Award for 2002–2003, and the "Special Game of the Year" for 2009–2010. His "Masuda Award" was for his development of the Crab Silvers opening.

Kodama also received the Japan Shogi Association's "25 Years Service Award" in 2004.
