= Yūya Nagaoka =

Japanese shogi player

- Native name: 長岡裕也
- Born: August 18, 1985 (age 41)
- Hometown: Hachiōji, Tokyo

Career
- Achieved professional status: April 1, 2005 (aged 19)
- Badge number: 256
- Rank: 6-dan
- Teacher: Kunio Yonenaga (9-dan)
- Meijin class: C2
- Ryūō class: 6

Websites
- JSA profile page

Yūya Nagaoka (長岡 裕也, Nagaoka Yūya; born August 18, 1985) is a Japanese professional shogi player ranked 6-dan.

== Shogi professional ==
=== Promotion history ===
The promotion history for Nagaoka is as follows:

- 6-kyū: 1997
- 1-dan: 2001
- 4-dan: April 1, 2005
- 5-dan: November 2, 2010
- 6-dan: December 10, 2020
