= Chikara Akutsu =

Japanese professional shōgi player

- Native name: 阿久津主税
- Born: June 24, 1982 (age 44)
- Hometown: Nishinomiya

Career
- Achieved professional status: October 1, 1999 (aged 17)
- Badge number: 233
- Rank: 8 dan
- Teacher: Seiichirō Taki
- Tournaments won: 2
- Meijin class: B2
- Ryūō class: 2

Websites
- JSA profile page

Chikara Akutsu (阿久津 主税, Akutsu Chikara; born June 24, 1982) is a Japanese professional shogi player ranked 8-dan.

== Shogi professional ==
On July 15, 2026, Akutsu defeated Kensuke Kitahama in 85th Meijin Class B2 Ranking League game to become the 68th professional to win 600 official games.

=== Promotion history ===
The promotion history for Akutsu is as follows:

- 6-kyū: 1994
- 1-dan: 1997
- 4-dan: October 1, 1999
- 5-dan: July 2, 2004
- 6-dan: August 3, 2007
- 7-dan: April 1, 2009
- 8-dan: February 13, 2014

=== Titles and other championships ===
Although Akutsu has yet to appear in a major title match, he has won two non-major-title championships during his career: the 2nd Asahi Cup Open (2008) and the 17th Ginga Tournament (2009).

=== Awards and honors ===
Akutsu received the Japan Shogi Association Annual Shogi Awards for "Best New Player" in 2004, "Best Winning Percentage" in 2006, and "Most Consecutive Games Won" award in 2009.

=== Year-end prize money and game fee ranking ===
Akutsu has finished in the "Top 10" of the JSA's year-end prize money and game fee rankings only once during his career. He earned a total of JPY 25,700,000 to rank ninth in 2009.
