= Masakazu Kondō =

Japanese shogi player

- Native name: 近藤正和
- Born: May 31, 1971 (age 54)
- Hometown: Kashiwazaki, Niigata

Career
- Achieved professional status: October 1, 1996 (aged 25)
- Badge Number: 220
- Rank: 7-dan
- Teacher: Yasuo Harada (9-dan)
- Meijin class: Free
- Ryūō class: 6

Websites
- JSA profile page

Masakazu Kondō (近藤 正和, Kondō Masakazu; May 31, 1971)is a Japanese professional shogi player ranked 7-dan. He is known for developing the set of Cheerful Central Rook openings.

== Early life and apprenticeship ==
Kondō was born on May 31, 1971, in Kashiwazaki, Niigata. He entered the Japan Shogi Association's apprentice school in 1983 at the rank of 6-kyū under the guidance of shogi professional Yasuo Harada . He was promoted to the rank of 1-dan in 1987, and obtained full professional status and the rank of 4-dan in October 1996.

== Shogi professional ==
=== Promotion history ===
Kondō's promotion history is as follows:

- 6-kyū: 1983
- 1-dan: 1987
- 4-dan: October 1, 1996
- 5-dan: September 12, 2001
- 6-dan: July 19, 2007
- 7-dan: May 20, 2021

=== Awards and honors ===
Kondō received the Japan Shogi Association the Masuda Award for 2001 as well as the Annual Shogi Awards for "Best Winning Percentage" and "Most Consecutive Games Won" for 2004.
