= Hisashi Namekata =

Japanese shogi player (born 1973)

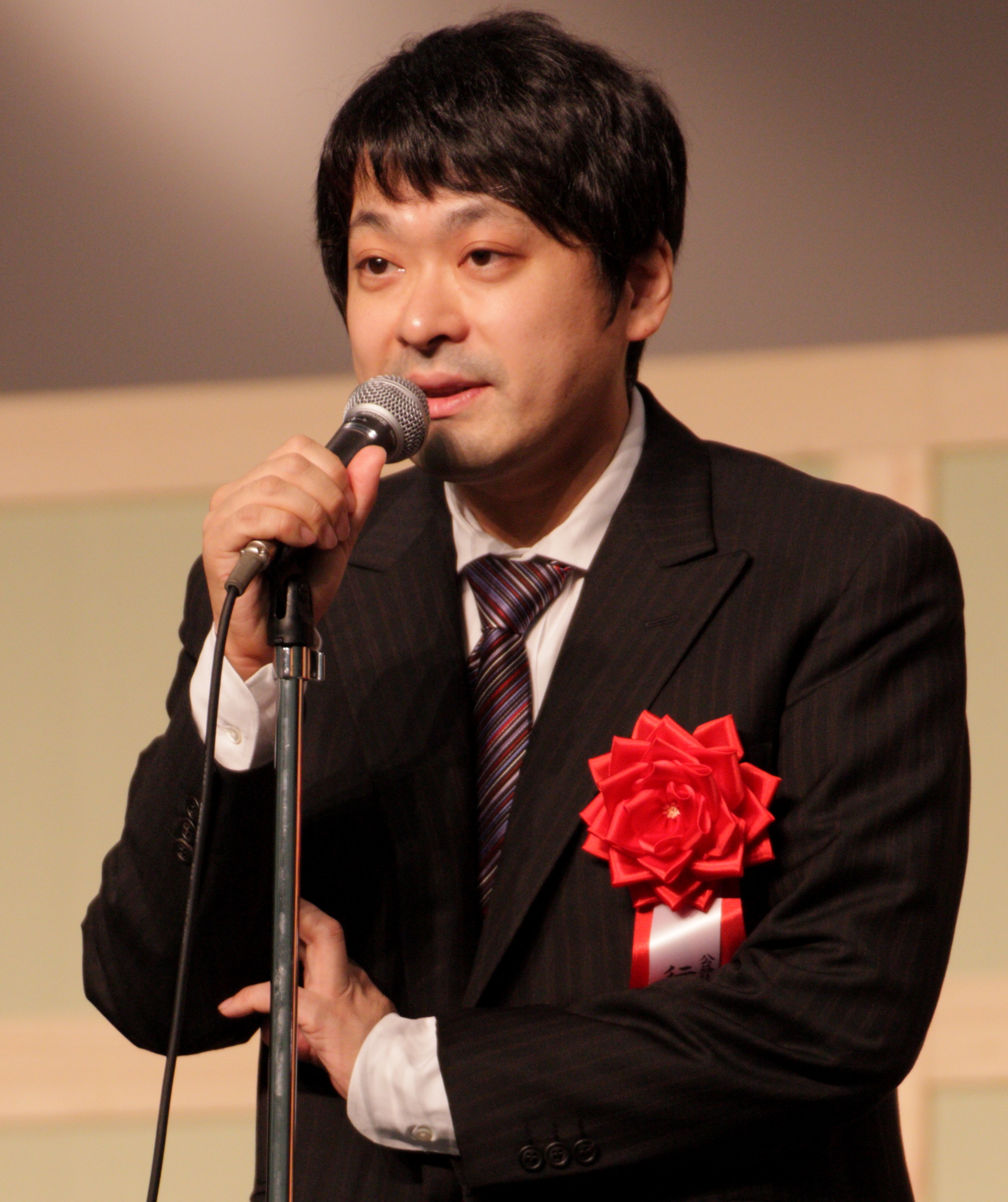
- Namekata at an August 2014 event.
- Native name: 行方尚史
- Born: December 30, 1973 (age 52)
- Hometown: Hirosaki

Career
- Achieved professional status: October 1, 1993 (aged 19)
- Badge Number: 208
- Rank: 9-dan
- Teacher: Yasuharu Ōyama (9-dan)
- Tournaments won: 2
- Meijin class: B2
- Ryūō class: 3

Websites
- JSA profile page

Hisashi Namekata (行方 尚史, Namekata Hisashi; born December 30, 1973) is a Japanese professional shogi player ranked 9-dan. He is also a non-executive director of the Japan Shogi Association.

== Early life, amateur shogi and apprenticeship ==
Namekata was born in Hirosaki, Aomori Prefecture on December 30, 1973. As a sixth-grade elementary school student, he finished third in the 10th Elementary Student Meijin Tournament in 1985. After graduating elementary school in 1986, he entered the Japan Shogi Association's apprentice school at the rank of 6-kyū under the guidance of Yasuharu Ōyama as a twelve year old, and was awarded professional status and the rank of 4-dan on October 1, 1993, at the age of 19.

== Shogi professional ==
In 2015, Namekata finished tied for first with Akira Watanabe, Toshiaki Kubo and Akihito Hirose in the Class A league for the right to challenge to Habu for the 73rd Meijin title. Each player finished league play with 6 wins and 3 losses, so a playoff was held to determine the challenger. A step-ladder playoff system with the player's league seed determining their playoff seed was held. Namaketa needed to only win one game to become the challenger since he was the highest league seed of the four, whereas the two lowest seeds Kubo and Hirose needed to win three games each to become challenger. Kubo beat Hirose and then Watanabe in rounds one and two respectively to face Namekata in the final game of the playoff. Namekata then defeated Kubo to win the playoff. In the title match, Namekata and Habu were tied after two games before Habu won the next three games to defend his title 4 games to 1.

On January 29, 2018, Namekata defeated Yasuaki Murayama in a round 2 preliminary game of the 89th Kisei Tournament to win his 600th official game as a professional.

=== Promotion history ===
Namekata's promotion history is as follows:

- 6-kyū: 1986
- 1-dan: 1990
- 4-dan: October 1, 1993
- 5-dan: October 1, 1995
- 6-dan: June 21, 1999
- 7-dan: April 1, 2004
- 8-dan: April 1, 2007
- 9-dan: November 14, 2019

=== Titles and other championships ===
Namekata has been the challenger for a major title twice, but was unsuccessful both times. His first appearance was in 2013 when defeated Yasumitsu Satō to become the challenger to Yoshiharu Habu for the 54th Ōi Match, but he ended losing to Habu 4 games to 1.

Namekata has won two non-title shogi tournaments. He won the 14th Quick Play Young Professionals Tournament tournament for top shogi professionals under the age of 30 for the year 1995 and the 1st Asahi Cup Open for the year 2007.

=== Awards and honors ===
Namekata was awarded the Japan Shogi Association Annual Shogi Awards for "Best New Player" in 1995 and "Best Winning Percentage" in 1998.

=== Year-end prize money and game fee ranking ===
Namekata has finished in the "Top 10" of the JSA's year-end prize money/game fee rankings four times since turning professional: ninth in 2008 with JPY 20,680,000 in earnings, seventh in 2013 with JPY 18,210,000 in earnings, sixth in 2014 with JPY 20,900,000 in earnings, and fifth in 2015 with JPY 26,890,000 in earnings.

== JSA director ==
Namekata was elected to the Japan Shogi Association's board of directors as a non-executive director in June 2023 and re-elected as such to another two-year term in June 2025.
