= Nobuyuki Ōuchi =

Japanese shogi player (1941–2017)

- Native name: 大内延介
- Born: October 2, 1941
- Hometown: Minato, Tokyo
- Nationality: Japanese
- Died: June 23, 2017 (aged 75)

Career
- Achieved professional status: April 1, 1963 (aged 21)
- Badge Number: 86
- Rank: 9-dan
- Retired: April 20, 2010 (aged 68)
- Teacher: Ichitarō Doi (Honorary Meijin)
- Major titles won: 1
- Tournaments won: 8
- Career record: 887–807 (.524)
- Notable students: Yasuaki Tsukada; Eisaku Tomioka; Daisuke Suzuki; Kōsuke Tamura; Natsuko Fujimori

Websites
- JSA profile page

Nobuyuki Ōuchi (大内 延介, Ōuchi Nobuyuki; October 2, 1941 – June 23, 2017) was a Japanese professional shogi player who achieved the rank of 9-dan. He won the first Kiō title in 1976, and also served as senior managing director of the Japan Shogi Association from 1993 to 1999. He was awarded the Japanese government's Order of the Rising Sun in 2015.

== Early life and education ==
Ōuchi was born on October 2, 1941, in Minato, Tokyo.

In 1954, he entered the Japan Shogi Association's apprentice school at the rank of 6-kyū under guidance of shogi professional Ichitarō Doi. He was promoted to the rank of apprentice professional 1-dan in 1958, and obtained professional status and the rank of 4-dan in April 1963.

Ōuchi was the first graduate of Chuo University to become a professional shogi player.

== Professional shogi ==
Ōuchi was the challenger for the Meijin title in 1975 against Makoto Nakahara. He retired from professional shogi in April 2010.

=== Promotion history ===
The promotion history for Ōuchi is as follows:

- 6-kyū: 1954
- 1-dan: 1958
- 4-dan: April 1, 1963
- 5-Dan: April 1, 1984
- 6-dan: April 1, 1985
- 7-dan: April 1, 1970
- 8-dan: April 1, 1972
- 9-dan: April 1, 1984
- Retired: April 20, 2010

=== Titles and other championships ===
Ōuchi appeared in major title matches a total of four times and won one major title. He won the Kiō title in 1976 for his only major title. In addition to his one major title, Ōuchi won eight other shogi championships during his career.

==== Non-title championships ====
Tournament	Years	Number of times
^{*}Kogō Shineisen	1961–2	2
^{*}Japan Shogi Association Cup	1974, 1980	2
NHK Cup	1975	1
^{*}All Star Kachinuki-sen	1978	1
^{*}All Nihon Pro	1987	1
Other		1

Note: Tournaments marked with an asterisk (*) are no longer held.

=== Awards and honors ===
Ōuchi received a number of awards and honors throughout his career for his accomplishments both on an off the shogi board. These include awards given out annually by the JSA for performance in official games as well as other awards for career accomplishments, and awards received from governmental organizations, etc. for contributions made to Japanese society.

In November 2015, Ōuchi became the 25th professional shogi player to be awarded the Order of the Rising Sun for his contributions to the promotion of Japanese culture.

==== Annual Shogi Awards ====
- 2nd Annual Awards (April 1974 – March 1975): Most Consecutive Games Won, Distinguished Service Award
- 3rd Annual Awards (April 1975 – March 1976): Fighting-spirit Award
- 5th Annual Awards (April 1977 – March 1978): Most Consecutive Games Won
- 14th Annual Awards (April 1986 – March 1987): Special Award
- 36th Annual Awards (April 2008 – March 2009): Tokyo Shogi Press Club Award
- 45th Annual Awards (April 2017 – March 2018): Masuda Special Prize (for numerous contributions made to the Bear-in-the-hole castle in Ranging Rook openings)

==== Other awards ====
- 1982: Sankei Children's Book Award (Sankei Shimbun Category)
- 1987: Shogi Honor Award (Awarded by the JSA in recognition of winning 600 official games as a professional)
- 1987: 25 Years Service Award (Awarded by the JSA in recognition of being an active professional for twenty-five years)
- 2000: Shogi Honor Fighting-spirit Award (Awarded by JSA in recognition of winning 800 official games as a professional)
- 2002: 40 Years Service Award (Awarded by the JSA in recognition of being an active professional for forty years)
- 2015: Order of the Rising Sun

== Death ==
Ōuchi died on June 23, 2017, at age 75. The cause of death was not made public. A memorial service for Ōuchi was held on July 17, 2017, at the headquarters of the JSA in Tokyo. The service was attended by roughly 500 people, including relatives, friends and fans.
