= Shin'ya Satō (shogi) =

Japanese shogi player (born 1977)

- Native name: 佐藤紳哉
- Born: August 29, 1977 (age 48)
- Hometown: Sagamihara

Career
- Achieved professional status: October 1, 1997 (aged 20)
- Badge Number: 224
- Rank: 7-dan
- Teacher: Terutaka Yasue (8-dan)
- Meijin class: C2
- Ryūō class: 4

Websites
- JSA profile page
- Official website

Shin'ya Satō (佐藤 紳哉, Satō Shin'ya; born August 29, 1977) is a Japanese professional shogi player ranked 7-dan.

== Early life and apprentice professional ==
Sato was born on August 29, 1977, in Sagamihara, Kanagawa Prefecture. He learned shogi from his father when he was about six years old, and entered the Japan Shogi Association's apprentice school at the rank of 6-kyū in 1990 under the guidance of shogi professional Terutaka Yasue. He obtained full professional status and the rank of 4-dan in October 1997 after winning the 21st 3-dan League (April 1997 – September 1997) with a record of 14 wins and 4 losses.

== Shogi professional ==
Satō finished runner-up to Takayuki Yamasaki in the 35th Shinjin-Ō in November 2004, losing 2 games to 1 in the best-of-three championship round.

In October 2013, Satō was one of five shogi professionals chosen by the JSA to play in the Denō-sen 3 match (March – April 2014) against five computer shogi programs. Satō played in Game 2 of the match on March 22, 2014, and his opponent was the program Yaneuraou. Satō lost the game in 95 moves.

=== Promotion history ===
The promotion history for Satō is as follows.

- 6-kyū: 1990
- 1-dan: 1993
- 4-dan: October 1, 1997
- 5-dan: January 24, 2003
- 6-dan: August 28, 2007
- 7-dan: December 17, 2015

=== Awards and honors ===
Satō received the Japan Shogi Association Annual Shogi Awards for "Best New Player" and "Best Winning Percentage" for the 2005–06 shogi year.

== Personal life ==
=== Wig performances ===
Satō has achieved quite a bit of notoriety for his "wig performances" during various shogi related and other TV appearances. He has stated in interviews that he began to notice he was starting to lose his hair around he was 22 years old. He tried some commercial hair restoration medications at first, but they were ineffective. He then tried getting perms to cover his hair loss but they only seemed to damage his remaining hair and make things worse. Eventually by the time he turned 25, he had lost most of the hair at the top of his head.

Satō has said he decided to purchase his first wig when he was 29 years old. He said he did so because the top of his head started to feel "lonely". He then started to use the wigs as a "tool" at live events to add some humor and make shogi fans laugh a little because felt simple straight-forward game commentary was not as interesting. Removing and re-adding his wig made his game commentary funnier and helped him stand out a bit. His performance during the commentary of Sōta Fujii's record-setting 29th consecutive win—a live AbemaTV webcast on June 26, 2017, watched by an estimated 7.4 million people—is where the "wig legend" is said to have been born and the first time his performance was seen by so many people.

Satō has a about fifteen wigs of various colors, and that he tends to purchase less expensive ones that look cheap because nicer more expensive order-made ones would not likely last long due to all constant putting on and taking off he does during events and other appearances. He also has said that although he uses the wigs as a joke to make people laugh, they also help him feel better and give him courage, and that some fans have told him that his performances do the same for them. He even credits his wigs as helping get married since he met his wife at a wedding reception for a fellow shogi professional in 2014. The two were seated at the same table and struck up a conversation. Later on his wife saw some online videos of his "wig performances" and found them to be very funny, the relationship grew, and the two were married a year later.
