= Eisaku Tomioka =

Japanese shogi player (born 1964)

- Native name: 富岡英作
- Born: May 19, 1964 (age 61)
- Hometown: Yokohama
- Nationality: Japanese

Career
- Achieved professional status: December 18, 1984 (aged 20)
- Badge Number: 168
- Rank: 8-dan
- Teacher: Nobuyuki Ōuchi (9-dan)
- Meijin class: Free
- Ryūō class: 6

Websites
- JSA profile page

Eisaku Tomioka (富岡 英作, Tomioka Eisaku; born May 19, 1964) is a Japanese professional shogi player ranked 8-dan.

== Early life, amateur shogi and apprentice professional ==
Eisaku Tomioka was born in Yokohama, Kanagawa Prefecture on May 19, 1964. He learned how to play shogi as a kindergartener from his father, and was the best player in his class as a fifth-grade elementary school student. Looking for stronger competition, he decided to apply for the Japan Shogi Association's apprentice school. Tomioka entered the apprentice school at the rank of 6-kyū under the guidance of shogi professional Nobuyuki Ōuchi in November 1978, was promoted to 1-dan in 1981, and finally obtained full professional status and the rank of 4-dan in December 1984.

== Shogi professional ==
Tomioka finished the 81st Meijin Ranking League season with a record of 2 wins and 8 losses in Class C2. Since his result earned him a second relegation point, he decided to become "Free class" player instead of risking the automatic relegation that happens when a player receives three relegation points in Class C2.

Tomioka became the 61st shogi professional to reach 600 career wins on November 2, 2023.

=== Promotion history ===
The promotion history of Tomioka is as follows:

- 6-kyū: 1978
- 1-dan: 1981
- 4-dan: December 18, 1984
- 5-dan: April 1, 1986
- 6-dan: April 1, 1988
- 7-dan: April 1, 1992
- 8-dan: December 20, 2002

=== Awards and honors ===
Tomioka received the Japan Shogi Association's Annual Shogi Awards for "Best New Player" and "Best Winning Percentage" in 1985. He also received the Kōzō Masuda Award in 2016 for his development of the Tomioka Bishop Exchange, Reclining Silver.

In 2009, he received the JSA's "25 Years Service Award" in recognition of being an active professional for twenty-five years.
