= Kiō =

Major tournament in professional shogi

Kiō (棋王) is one of the eight major title tournaments in professional shogi. The word means the "king of the board" (i.e. it is a combination of the kanji characters for board (棋, ki) and king (王, ō)).

== Overview ==
The tournament started in 1974 as a continuation of the Strongest Player Tournament (最強者決定戦 (Saikyōsha Ketteisen)) held from 1961 to 1973, which itself was a continuation of the 9-dan, 8-dan and 7-dan Tournament (九, 八, 七段戦 (Kyū, Hachi, Nanadansen)) held from 1954 to 1956 and its successor the Japan Cup (日本一杯争奪戦 (Nihon'ichihai Sodatsusen) held from 1957 to 1960. The Kiō tournament was promoted to a major title tournament in 1975. The championship match is held from February to March. The challenger for the Kiō title is determined by the first and second preliminary rounds. In the second round, the losers in the semi-finals and final play consolation games, then the winners of the final and consolation-final advance to a two-game playoff. The winner of the consolation games has to win both games to become the challenger while the winner of the final has to win only one of the two games.

== Lifetime Kiō ==
Lifetime (Eisei) Kiō is the title given to a player who won the championship five times in a row. Active players may qualify for this title, but it is only officially awarded upon their retirement or death. In 1995 (the 20th Kiō Match), Yoshiharu Habu won his fifth Kiō title in a row, thus becoming the first professional to qualify for the title. In 2017, Akira Watanabe won his fifth title in a row to join Habu as the only professionals to have accomplished this feat.

== Winners ==
The following table shows a list of past winners.

No.	Year	Winner	Score	Opponent
1	1975	Nobuyuki Ōuchi		(League)
2	1976	Hifumi Katō	3-0	Nobuyuki Ōuchi
3	1977	Hifumi Katō (2)	3-0	Makoto Nakahara
4	1978	Kunio Yonenaga	3-2	Hifumi Katō
5	1979	Makoto Nakahara	3-1	Kunio Yonenaga
6	1980	Kunio Yonenaga (2)	3-1	Makoto Nakahara
7	1981	Kunio Yonenaga (3)	3-2	Hidemitsu Moriyasu
8	1982	Kunio Yonenaga (4)	3-0	Yasuharu Oyama
9	1983	Kunio Yonenaga (5)	3-1	Hidemitsu Moriyasu
10	1984	Kiyozumi Kiriyama	3-1	Kunio Yonenaga
11	1985	Kōji Tanigawa	3-0	Kiyozumi Kiriyama
12	1986	Michio Takahashi	3-1	Kōji Tanigawa
13	1987	Koji Tanigawa (2)	3-2	Michio Takahashi
14	1988	Yoshikazu Minami	3-2	Kōji Tanigawa
15	1989	Yoshikazu Minami (2)	3-0	Yasuharu Oyama
16	1990	Yoshiharu Habu	3-1	Yoshikazu Minami
17	1991	Yoshiharu Habu (2)	3-1	Yoshikazu Minami
18	1992	Yoshiharu Habu (3)	3-2	Kōji Tanigawa
19	1993	Yoshiharu Habu (4)	3-0	Yoshikazu Minami
20	1994	Yoshiharu Habu (5)	3-0	Taku Morishita
21	1995	Yoshiharu Habu (6)	3-0	Michio Takahashi
22	1996	Yoshiharu Habu (7)	3-0	Taku Morishita
23	1997	Yoshiharu Habu (8)	3-1	Masataka Gōda
24	1998	Yoshiharu Habu (9)	3-0	Yasumitsu Sato
25	1999	Yoshiharu Habu (10)	3-1	Toshiyuki Moriuchi
26	2000	Yoshiharu Habu (11)	3-1	Toshiaki Kubo
27	2001	Yoshiharu Habu (12)	3-1	Yasumitsu Sato
28	2002	Tadahisa Maruyama	3-2	Yoshiharu Habu
29	2003	Kōji Tanigawa (3)	3-1	Tadahisa Maruyama
30	2004	Yoshiharu Habu (13)	3-0	Kōji Tanigawa
31	2005	Toshiyuki Moriuchi	3-1	Yoshiharu Habu
32	2006	Yasumitsu Sato	3-2	Toshiyuki Moriuchi
33	2007	Yasumitsu Sato (2)	3-2	Yoshiharu Habu
34	2008	Toshiaki Kubo	3-2	Yasumitsu Sato
35	2009	Toshiaki Kubo (2)	3-2	Yasumitsu Sato
36	2010	Toshiaki Kubo (3)	3-1	Akira Watanabe
37	2011	Masataka Gōda	3-1	Toshiaki Kubo
38	2012	Akira Watanabe	3-1	Masataka Gōda
39	2013	Akira Watanabe (2)	3-0	Hiroyuki Miura
40	2014	Akira Watanabe (3)	3-0	Yoshiharu Habu
41	2015	Akira Watanabe (4)	3-1	Amahiko Satō
42	2016	Akira Watanabe (5)	3-2	Shōta Chida
43	2017	Akira Watanabe (6)	3-2	Takuya Nagase
44	2018	Akira Watanabe (7)	3-1	Akihito Hirose
45	2019	Akira Watanabe (8)	3-1	Kei Honda
46	2020	Akira Watanabe (9)	3-1	Tetsurō Itodani
47	2021	Akira Watanabe (10)	3-1	Takuya Nagase
48	2022	Sōta Fujii	3-1	Akira Watanabe
49	2023	Sōta Fujii (2)	3-0 (Note: Four games were actually played due to Game 1 ending in impasse.)	Takumi Itō
50	2024	Sōta Fujii (3)	3–0	Yasuhiro Masuda
51	2025	Sōta Fujii (4)	3–2	Yasuhiro Masuda

== Records ==
- Most titles overall: Yoshiharu Habu, 13
- Most consecutive titles: Yoshiharu Habu, 12 in a row (1991-2002)
