= Hiroki Nakata =

Japanese shogi player (1964–2023)

- Native name: 中田宏樹
- Born: October 20, 1964
- Hometown: Musashino, Tokyo, Japan
- Died: February 7, 2023 (aged 58)

Career
- Achieved professional status: May 13, 1987 (aged 22)
- Badge Number: 173
- Rank: 9-dan
- Teacher: Noboru Sakurai (9-dan)
- Tournaments won: 2
- Career record: 770–592 (.565)

Websites
- JSA profile page

Hiroki Nakata (中田 宏樹, Nakata Hiroki; October 20, 1964 – February 7, 2023) was a Japanese professional shogi player who achieved the rank of 8-dan, but was posthumously promoted to 9-dan.

== Shogi professional ==
In August 2008, Nakata defeated Yoshinori Satō to become the 36th professional to win 600 official games.

Nakata was given the nickname "Devil Nakata" due to his cool manner and poker face as well as "devil-like" attacking style during his games. Nakata's career record in official games was 770 wins and 592 losses.

=== Promotion history ===
Nakata's promotion history is as follows:

- 6-kyū: 1976
- 1-dan: 1980
- 4-dan: November 28, 1985
- 5-dan: December 16, 1988
- 6-dan: April 6, 1992
- 7-dan: November 11, 1997
- 8-dan: January 27, 2006
- Death: February 7, 2023
- 9-dan: February 10, 2023 (posthumous promotion)

=== Titles and other championships ===
Nakata made one appearance in a major title match. He was the challenger for the 32nd Ōi title in 1991 against Kōji Tanigawa, but lost the match 4 games to 2. He won two non-major-title championships during his career. He won the 12th All Star Kachinuki-sen (1989) and 18th All Star Kachinuki-sen (1997–1998).

=== Awards and honors ===
Nakata received a number of awards and honors throughout his career for his accomplishments both on and off the shogi board. These include awards given out annually by the Japan Shogi Association (JSA) for performance in official games as well as other JSA awards for career accomplishments, and awards received from governmental organizations, etc. for contributions made to Japanese society.

==== Annual shogi awards ====
- 14th Annual Awards (April 1986 – March 1987): Best Winning Percentage
- 18th Annual Awards (April 1994 – March 1995): Most Consecutive Games Won
- 19th Annual Awards (April 1995 – March 1996): Most Consecutive Games Won, Best New Player

==== Other awards ====
- 2008: Shogi Honor Award (Awarded by the JSA in recognition of winning 600 official games as a professional)
- 2010: 25 Years Service Award (Awarded by the JSA in recognition of being an active professional for twenty-five years)

== Death ==
Nakata started to have health problems in October 2022 which caused him to forfeit several official games. On February 1, 2023, the JSA posted on its official website that Nakata was being granted an official leave of absence to receive medical treatment from February 1, 2023, until March 31, 2023. On February 9, the JSA announced that Nakata had died on February 7, 2023, at the age of 58.

On February, 13, 2023, the JSA announced that it had posthumously promoted Nakata to 9-dan.
