= Mitsunori Makino =

Japanese shogi player

- Native name: 牧野光則
- Born: April 16, 1988 (age 37)
- Hometown: Wakayama, Wakayama, Japan

Career
- Achieved professional status: April 1, 2010 (aged 21)
- Badge Number: 279
- Rank: 6-dan
- Teacher: Akira Kinoshita (7-dan)
- Meijin class: C2
- Ryūō class: 6

Websites
- JSA profile page

Mitsunori Makino (牧野 光則, Makino Mitsunori; born April 16, 1988) is a Japanese professional shogi player ranked 6-dan.

== Shogi professional ==
=== Promotion history ===
The promotion history for Makino is as follows:

- 6-kyū: September 22, 1999
- 4-dan: April 1, 2010
- 5-dan: February 25, 2015
- 6-dan: February 10, 2021
