= Kunio Yonenaga =

- Native name: 米長 邦雄
- Born: June 10, 1943
- Hometown: Masuho, Yamanashi
- Nationality: Japanese
- Died: December 18, 2012 (aged 69)

Career
- Achieved professional status: April 1, 1963 (aged 19)
- Badge number: 92
- Rank: 9-dan
- Retired: December 17, 2003 (aged 56)
- Teacher: Yūji Sasei (Honorary 9-dan)
- Lifetime titles: Lifetime Kisei
- Major titles won: 19
- Tournaments won: 16
- Career record: 1103–800 (.580)
- Notable students: Manabu Senzaki; Daisuke Nakagawa; Nō Itō; Yūya Nagaoka; Issei Takazaki; Taichi Nakamura; Kazuo Sugimoto; Naoko Hayashiba

Websites
- JSA profile page

Kunio Yonenaga (米長 邦雄, Yonenaga Kunio; June 10, 1943 – December 18, 2012) was a Japanese professional shogi player and president of Japan Shogi Association from May 2005 to December 18, 2012. He received an honorary title Lifetime Kisei due to his remarkable results in the Kisei title tournament. He was a former Meijin and 10-dan.

== Biography ==
Yonenaga was born in Masuho, Yamanashi in 1943. He became a disciple of shogi professional Yūji Sase and moved to Tokyo to live with his teacher to become a professional.

Yonenaga became a professional in 1963 and was promoted to 9-dan in 1979.

Yonenaga was regarded as one of the best shogi players through the 1970s and 1980s. He won Kisei, his first titleholder championship in 1973 and dominated four of the seven shogi titles in 1984. He was awarded the Best Shogi Player of the Year thrice (1978, 1983 and 1984), though he had not won a Meijin title, then regarded the supreme tournament, for decades. He finally won Meijin in 1993 when he was 49 (the oldest on record), but he was defeated by Yoshiharu Habu the next year. Yonenaga retired in 2003.

He was also an education board member for Tokyo.

In 2008, Yonenaga announced he had suffered cancer since 2008 spring. He reported his cancer diagnosis on his website occasionally which later turned into a book Cancer Note (published in 2009).

Yonenaga was one of early shogi professionals who played with computer shogi publicly. In 2012 after he had already retired, Yonenaga played a game with bonkras, a computer shogi software, and lost. Yonenaga authored his last book I lost about this game.

Yonenaga died on December 18, 2012, from prostate cancer at a hospital in Tokyo.

== Titles and other championships ==
Title	Years Held
Meijin	1993
10 dan	1984–1985
Kisei	1973, 1980, 1983–1985
Oi	1979
Kioh	1979, 1981—1984
Osho	1983–1984, 1990

Title	Years Held
NHK Cup	1979
Nihon Series	1980, 1984, 1986

== Honours ==
- Medal with Purple Ribbon (2003)
- Order of the Rising Sun, 4th Class, Gold Rays with Rosette (2013)
