= Kōzō Masuda =

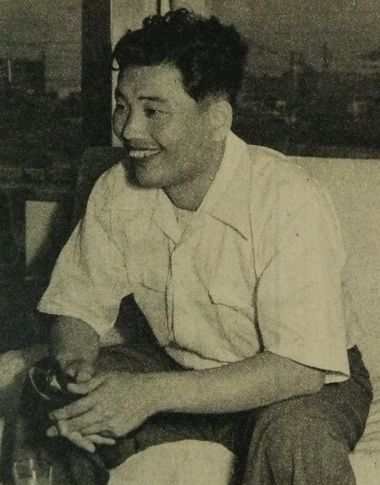
- Masuda in 1952
- Native name: 升田幸三
- Born: March 21, 1918
- Hometown: Mirasaka, Hiroshima
- Nationality: Japanese
- Died: April 5, 1991 (aged 73)

Career
- Achieved professional status: January 1, 1936 (aged 17)
- Badge Number: 18
- Rank: 9 dan
- Retired: 1979 (43 years)
- Teacher: Kinjirō Kimi
- Major titles won: 7
- Tournaments won: 6
- Career record: 544–376 (.591)

Websites
- JSA profile page

Kōzō Masuda (升田 幸三, Masuda Kōzō; March 21, 1918 – April 5, 1991) was a Japanese professional shogi player who achieved the rank of 9-dan. He is a former Meijin who was known for playing very creative shogi. For instance, top player Yoshiharu Habu considered Masuda's playing style to be 30 years ahead of its time and the origin of the modern way to play shogi.

== Life ==
=== Kōzō Masuda Award ===
Each year since 1995 the Japan Shogi Association has awarded the Kōzō Masuda Award (升田幸三賞 Masuda Kōzō Shō) to the player or players whose innovative new ideas in shogi theory or tactics, or whose new or excellent moves have attracted significant attention among other shogi players and fans during the year.

A second award is the Masuda Special Prize (升田幸三賞特別賞), which is given out infrequently.

=== Promotion history ===
The promotion history of Masuda is as follows:

- 1947: 8-dan
- 1959: 9-dan

=== Major titles and other championships ===
Masuda won the Meijin title in 1957 and 1958, and was the loser in the title match another eight times. He also won the Osho title three times (1951 and 1955–56) and the now defunct 9-dan Title twice (1957–58). Overall, Masuda won a major title seven times and appeared in a major title match twenty-three times during his career.

In addition to major titles, Masuda won the NHK Shogi Cup three times (1952, 1957 and 1963) and other shogi tournaments four times.

=== Awards and honors ===
Masuda was awarded the Japanese government's Medal of Honor with Purple Ribbons in November 1973.
