= Yasuaki Murayama =

Japanese shogi player (born 1984)

- Native name: 村山慈明
- Born: May 9, 1984 (age 41)
- Hometown: Hino, Tokyo

Career
- Achieved professional status: October 1, 2003 (aged 19)
- Badge Number: 249
- Rank: 8-dan
- Teacher: Noboru Sakurai (8-dan)
- Tournaments won: 2
- Meijin class: B2
- Ryūō class: 4

Websites
- JSA profile page

Yasuaki Murayama (村山 慈明, Murayama Yasuaki; born May 9, 1984) is a Japanese professional shogi player ranked 8-dan.

== Early life, amateur shogi and apprenticeship ==
Yasuaki Murayama was born on May 9, 1984, in Hino, Tokyo. He learned how to play shogi from his grandfather when he was 5 years old, and won the 20th Elementary School Student Meijin Tournament in 1995.

Murayama was accepted into the Japan Shogi Association's apprentice school at the rank of 6-kyū as a protegee of shogi professional Noboru Sakurai in September 1995 and was promoted to the rank of 1-dan in July 1998. Murayama obtained full professional status and the rank of 4-dan in October 2003 for winning the 33rd 3-dan League (April 2003 – September 2003) with a record of 15 wins and 3 losses.

== Shogi professional ==
Murayama won his first tournament as a professional in October 2007 when he defeated Ryōsuke Nakamura 2 games to none to win the 38th Shinjin-Ō tournament. In March 2016, Murayama defeated Shōta Chida to win the 65th NHK Cup Shogi TV Tournament.

In 2015, Murayama was one of five shogi professional selected to play a match against the five top shogi computers in the "Shogi Denousen Final", the final part of the Denou series of matches. Murayama lost Game 4 in 97 moves to Ponanza.

=== Promotion history ===
The promotion history for Murayama is as follows:

- 6-kyū: 1995
- 1-dan: 1998
- 4-dan: October 1, 2003
- 5-dan: December 14, 2007
- 6-dan: May 17, 2012
- 7-dan: March 13, 2014
- 8-dan: June 21, 2023

=== Titles and other championships ===
Murayama has won two non-major shogi championships during his career: the Shinjin-Ō in 2007 and NHK Cup Shogi TV Tournament in 2015.

=== Awards and honors ===
Murayama received the Japan Shogi Association Annual Shogi Awards for "Best New Player" (2007) and "Best Winning Percentage" (2007 and 2013).
