= Masataka Gōda =

Japanese shogi player (born 1971)

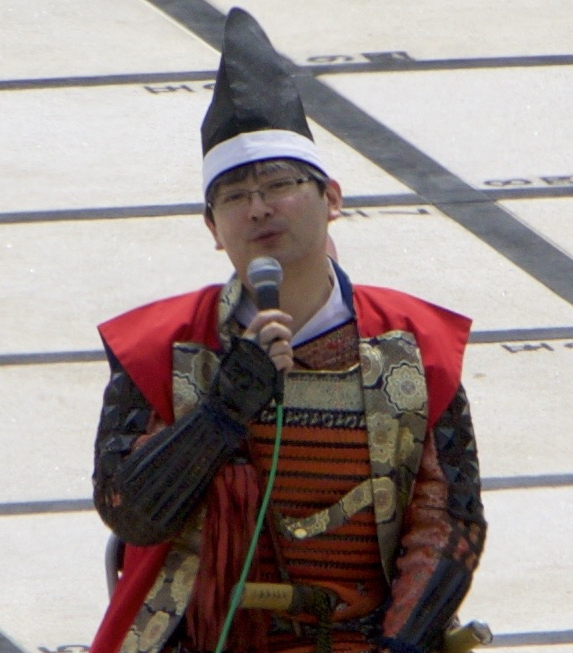
- Native name: 郷田真隆
- Born: March 17, 1971 (age 54)
- Hometown: Suginami

Career
- Achieved professional status: April 1, 1990 (aged 19)
- Badge Number: 195
- Rank: 9-dan
- Teacher: Noboru Ōtomo (9-dan)
- Major titles won: 6
- Tournaments won: 7
- Meijin class: B2
- Ryūō class: 2

Websites
- JSA profile page

Masataka Gōda (郷田 真隆, Gōda Masataka; born March 17, 1971) is a Japanese professional shogi player ranked 9-dan. He is a former major title holder, having won the Ōi, Kisei, Kiō and Ōshō titles throughout his career.

== Early life and apprenticeship ==
Gōda was born on March 17, 1971, in Suginami, Tokyo. He learned how to play shogi from his father when he was three years old.

In December 1982, he entered the Japan Shogi Association's apprentice school at the rank of 6-kyū under guidance of shogi professional Noboru Ōtomo. He was promoted to the rank of apprentice professional 1-dan in May 1985, and obtained professional status and the rank of 4-dan in February 1990.

== Shogi professional ==
Gōda's first appearance in a major title match came in May 1992 when he challenged Kōji Tanigawa for the 60th Kisei title. Although Goda lost the match 3 games to 1, he was at the time only the second 4-dan to be the challenger for a major title. Later in September of that same year, Gōda and Tanigawa met once again in the 33rd Ōi title match, with Gōda winning the match 4 games to 2 to become the first 4-dan to win a major title. In December 1992, Gōda met Tanigawa for the third time in the 61st Kisei title match, (Note: The Kisei title was contested twice yearly up to and including 1994. The current once-a-year format started in 1995.) with Tanigawa winning by the score of 3 games to 0, with one game ending in impasse.

Gōda won his next major title in 1998, defeating Nobuyuki Yashiki 3 games to 0 to win the 69th Kisei title. He was unable to retain the title the following year, losing to Tanigawa 3 games to none. In 2001, he regained the Kisei title by narrowly defeating Yoshiharu Habu by 3 games to 2. However, the following year he was again unable to defend his title, losing to Yasumitsu Satō by the same score of 3 games to 2.

In 2011, Gōda won the 37th Kiō title by defeating Toshiaki Kubo 3 games to 1. He was unable to successfully defend his Kiō title the next year, losing to Akira Watanabe 3 games to 1.

In 2014, Gōda won the 64th Ōshō title by defeating Watanabe 4 games to 3. At 44 years old, he became the oldest first-time winner of the Ōshō title. The following year, 23 years after winning his first major title, he completed his first successful major title defense by defeating Habu 4 games to 2. However, in 2016, Gōda was defeated by Kubo 4 games to 2 and lost his Ōshō title.

Gōda defeated Yoshinori Satō on October 3, 2007, to become the 36th shogi professional to win 600 official games, defeated Masayuki Toyoshima on October 17, 2015, to become the 18th shogi professional to win 800 official games, and defeated Makoto Tobe on July 9, 2025, to become the 13th professional to win 1000 official games.

=== Promotion history ===
Gōda's promotion history is as follows:

- 6-kyū: 1982
- 1-dan: 1985
- 4-dan: April 1, 1990
- 5-dan: October 1, 1992
- 6-dan: November 20, 1995
- 7-dan: April 1, 1998
- 8-dan: April 1, 1999
- 9-dan: August 6, 2001

=== Titles and other championships ===
Gōda has appeared in major title matches a total of eighteen times, and has won six major titles. In addition to major titles, Gōda has won seven other shogi championships during his career.

==== Major titles ====
Title	Years	Number of times overall
Ōi	1992	1
Kisei	1998, 2001	2
Kiō	2011	1
Ōshō	2014–15	2

==== Other championships ====
Tournament	Years	Number of times
JT Nihon Series	1993–95	3
^{*}Hayazashi Senshuken	1991	1
^{*}All Star Kachinuki-sen	1997	1
^{*}Daiwa Securities Strongest Player Cup	2007	1
NHK Cup	2013	1

Note: Tournaments marked with an asterisk (*) are no longer held.

=== Awards and honors ===
Gōda has received a number of awards and honors throughout his career for his accomplishments both on an off the shogi board. These include awards given out annually by the JSA for performance in official games as well as other JSA awards for career accomplishments, and awards received from governmental organizations, etc. for contributions made to Japanese society.

==== Annual shogi awards ====
- 20th Annual Awards (April 1992 – March 1993): Best New Player, Distinguished Service Award
- 22nd Annual Awards (April 1994 – March 1995): Most Games Won, Most Games Played, Distinguished Service Award
- 23rd Annual Awards (April 1995 – March 1996): Distinguished Service Award
- 25th Annual Awards (April 1997 – March 1998): Best Winning Percentage, Most Games Won, Most Games Played, Fighting-spirit Award
- 26th Annual Awards (April 1998 – March 1999): Fighting-spirit Award
- 29th Annual Awards (April 2001 – March 2002): Distinguished Service Award
- 39th Annual Awards (April 2011 – March 2012): Fighting-spirit Award
- 41st Annual Awards (April 2013 – March 2014): Fighting-spirit Award
- 42nd Annual Awards (April 2014 – March 2015): Fighting-spirit Award

==== Other awards ====
- 2007: Shogi Honor Award (Awarded by the JSA in recognition of winning 600 official games as a professional)
- 2015: 25 Years Service Award (Awarded by the JSA in recognition of being an active professional for twenty-five years), Shogi Honor Fighting-spirit Award (Awarded by JSA in recognition of winning 800 official games as a professional)

=== Year-end shogi prize money and game fee ranking ===
Gōda has finished in the "Top 10" of the JSA's year-end prize money and game fee rankings eighteen times since 1993.

Year	Amount (Note: All amounts are given in Japanese yen and include prize money and fees earned from official tournaments and games held from January 1 to December 31.)	Rank
1993	¥19,700,000	9th
1994	¥19,720,000	9th
1995	¥19,800,000	8th
1998	¥40,780,000	4th
1999	¥38,010,000	6th
2000	¥20,860,000	9th
2001	¥37,740,000	6th
2002	¥28,510,000	7th
2006	¥21,590,000	9th
2007	¥29,940,000	6th
2008	¥19,940,000	10th
2009	¥26,320,000	8th
2011	¥16,790,000	10th
2012	¥25,970,000	3rd
2013	¥34,530,000	4th
2014	¥23,400,000	4th
2015	¥24,670,000	7th
2016	¥31,850,000	6th
