= Duck opening =

Duck opening
☖ pieces in hand: –

9	8	7	6	5	4	3	2	1
香	桂				王		桂	香	1
			銀	金	銀	金	角		2
		歩	歩	歩	歩		歩	歩	3
歩	飛					歩			4
	歩								5
歩	歩						飛		6
角		歩	歩	歩	歩	歩		歩	7
			銀	玉	銀				8
香	桂	金				金	桂	香	9

☗ pieces in hand: 歩
Duck castle
☖ pieces in hand: –

9	8	7	6	5	4	3	2	1
									1
									2
									3
									4
									5
									6
		歩	歩	歩	歩	歩			7
			銀	玉	銀				8
		金				金			9

☗ pieces in hand: –

In shogi, the Duck or Duck Legs (アヒル ahiru) opening is a surprise Static Rook position characterized by a Duck castle and formation similar to a Double Wing Attack opening that transitions to a Twisting Rook-like position. It is typically used in a Double Static Rook game; however, there is a variation for playing against a Ranging Rook opponent.

The opening may be played by amateurs, but is not used by professional players.

Essentially, the opening tries to trade the major pieces to get them in hand in order to drop them within the opponent's camp. Since the Duck castle is defending broadly against major piece drops, this situation can favor the Duck player. Failing the piece exchange, the Duck opening typically aims for an edge attack to break through their opponent's camp.

== Against Static Rook ==
Duck opening
☖ pieces in hand: –

9	8	7	6	5	4	3	2	1
香	桂	銀	金	王		銀	桂	香	1
	飛						角		2
歩		歩	歩	歩	歩	歩	歩	歩	3
									4
	歩						歩		5
									6
歩	歩	歩	歩	歩	歩	歩		歩	7
	角						飛		8
香	桂	銀	金	玉	金	銀	桂	香	9

☗ pieces in hand: –

1. P-26 P-84, 2. P-25 P-85. Double Wing opening.

Black's early peeping bishop
☖ pieces in hand: –

9	8	7	6	5	4	3	2	1
香	桂		金	王		銀	桂	香	1
	飛		銀			金	角		2
歩		歩	歩	歩	歩	歩	歩	歩	3
									4
	歩						歩		5
歩									6
角	歩	歩	歩	歩	歩	歩		歩	7
							飛		8
香	桂	銀	金	玉	金	銀	桂	香	9

☗ pieces in hand: –
Black's early floating rook
☖ pieces in hand: –

9	8	7	6	5	4	3	2	1
香	桂	銀	金	王		銀	桂	香	1
	飛					金	角		2
歩		歩	歩	歩	歩	歩	歩	歩	3
									4
	歩						歩		5
							飛		6
歩	歩	歩	歩	歩	歩	歩		歩	7
	角								8
香	桂	銀	金	玉	金	銀	桂	香	9

☗ pieces in hand: –

After this, there are two published variations in 湯川 (2015). One has an early floating rook (in the section below) while the other variation has an early peeping bishop (immediately following section).

=== Early peeping bishop ===
Duck opening
☖ pieces in hand: –

9	8	7	6	5	4	3	2	1
香	桂	銀	金	王		銀	桂	香	1
	飛					金	角		2
歩		歩	歩	歩	歩	歩	歩	歩	3
									4
	歩						歩		5
歩									6
	歩	歩	歩	歩	歩	歩		歩	7
	角						飛		8
香	桂	銀	金	玉	金	銀	桂	香	9

☗ pieces in hand: –
Peeping bishop
☖ pieces in hand: –

9	8	7	6	5	4	3	2	1
香	桂		金	王		銀	桂	香	1
	飛		銀			金	角		2
歩		歩	歩	歩	歩	歩	歩	歩	3
									4
	歩						歩		5
歩									6
角	歩	歩	歩	歩	歩	歩		歩	7
							飛		8
香	桂	銀	金	玉	金	銀	桂	香	9

☗ pieces in hand: –

3. P-96. Protect bishop head indirectly via the edge pawn instead of the more common gold defense. This move allows for the peeping bishop (のぞき角 nozoki kaku) position characteristic of this opening.

3. ...G-22. Gold protects bishop head.

4. B-97. The peeping bishop. White's 53 pawn is now being attacked.

4. ...S-62. White must defend against the attack of Black's peeping bishop. Using their right silver to do this is a natural move since this silver is usually advanced for attack anyway. However, this move allows prevents White from using a direct Climbing Silver offensive.

Pawn trade, floating rook
☖ pieces in hand: –

9	8	7	6	5	4	3	2	1
香	桂		金		王	銀	桂	香	1
	飛		銀			金	角		2
歩		歩	歩	歩	歩	歩	歩	歩	3
									4
	歩								5
歩							飛		6
角	歩	歩	歩	歩	歩	歩		歩	7
									8
香	桂	銀	金	玉	金	銀	桂	香	9

☗ pieces in hand: 歩
Castling
☖ pieces in hand: –

9	8	7	6	5	4	3	2	1
香	桂				王		桂	香	1
	飛		銀	金	銀	金	角		2
歩		歩	歩	歩	歩	歩	歩	歩	3
									4
	歩								5
歩							飛		6
角	歩	歩	歩	歩	歩	歩		歩	7
			銀		銀				8
香	桂		金	玉	金		桂	香	9

☗ pieces in hand: 歩

5. P-24 Px24, 6. Rx24. Black trades his second file pawn in order to get a pawn in hand.

6. ...P*23. White must protect their bishop head square (23) from Black dropping a pawn there. Dropping a pawn on 23 for this purpose is a standard move in Double Wing openings.

7. R-26. Black retreats their rook to rank 6 in a floating rook position. This floating rook position is necessary in the Duck opening, since Black must protect their peeping bishop from an edge attack if White pushes their ninth file pawn (...P-94, ...P-95).

7. ...K-41. White starts castling their king leftward away from their rook.

8. S-68 S-42, 9. S-48 G-52. Black also starts castling first, starting with moving both silvers up and toward the center, building the legs of the Duck castle. White builds a Crab castle.

Castling
☖ pieces in hand: –

9	8	7	6	5	4	3	2	1
香	桂				王		桂	香	1
	飛		銀	金	銀	金	角		2
歩		歩	歩	歩	歩	歩	歩	歩	3
									4
	歩								5
歩							飛		6
角	歩	歩	歩	歩	歩	歩		歩	7
			銀		銀				8
香	桂	金		玉	金		桂	香	9

☗ pieces in hand: 歩
Bishop pressure
☖ pieces in hand: –

9	8	7	6	5	4	3	2	1
香	桂				王		桂	香	1
	飛		銀	金	銀	金	角		2
歩		歩	歩	歩	歩		歩	歩	3
						歩			4
	歩								5
歩							飛		6
角	歩	歩	歩	歩	歩	歩		歩	7
			銀		銀				8
香	桂	金		玉	金		桂	香	9

☗ pieces in hand: 歩

10. G-79. Black moves both golds outward, creating the Duck feet.

10. ...P-34. White activates their bishop by openings its diagonal.

Twisting Rook move
☖ pieces in hand: 歩

9	8	7	6	5	4	3	2	1
香	桂				王		桂	香	1
			銀	金	銀	金	角		2
		歩	歩	歩	歩		歩	歩	3
歩	飛					歩			4
									5
歩	飛								6
角		歩	歩	歩	歩	歩		歩	7
			銀	玉	銀				8
香	桂	金				金	桂	香	9

☗ pieces in hand: 歩歩

Black offers a rook trade. A rook trade would be beneficial to Black since their Duck castle has their camp well defended against a rook drop, while White's camp has open undefended spaces. Therefore, White should reject the rook trade.

==== Rejecting rook trade ====
Rejecting rook trade
☖ pieces in hand: –

9	8	7	6	5	4	3	2	1
香	桂				王		桂	香	1
			銀	金	銀	金	角		2
		歩	歩	歩	歩		歩	歩	3
歩	飛					歩			4
	歩								5
歩	飛								6
角		歩	歩	歩	歩	歩		歩	7
			銀	玉	銀				8
香	桂	金				金	桂	香	9

☗ pieces in hand: 歩歩
Rejecting rook trade
☖ pieces in hand: –

9	8	7	6	5	4	3	2	1
香	桂				王		桂	香	1
			銀	金	銀	金	角		2
		歩	歩	歩	歩		歩	歩	3
歩	飛					歩			4
	歩								5
歩						飛			6
角		歩	歩	歩	歩	歩		歩	7
			銀	玉	銀				8
香	桂	金				金	桂	香	9

☗ pieces in hand: 歩歩

Rejecting rook trade
☖ pieces in hand: –

9	8	7	6	5	4	3	2	1
香	桂				王		桂	香	1
			銀	金		金	角		2
		歩	歩	歩	歩	銀	歩	歩	3
歩	飛					歩			4
	歩								5
歩						飛			6
角		歩	歩	歩	歩	歩		歩	7
			銀	玉	銀				8
香	桂	金				金	桂	香	9

☗ pieces in hand: 歩歩
Rejecting rook trade
☖ pieces in hand: –

9	8	7	6	5	4	3	2	1
香	桂				王		桂	香	1
			銀	金		金	角		2
		歩	歩		歩	銀	歩	歩	3
歩	飛			歩		歩			4
	歩								5
歩		飛							6
角		歩	歩	歩	歩	歩		歩	7
			銀	玉	銀				8
香	桂	金				金	桂	香	9

☗ pieces in hand: 歩歩

===== Edge attack =====
Rejecting rook trade
☖ pieces in hand: –

9	8	7	6	5	4	3	2	1
香	桂				王		桂	香	1
			銀	金		金	角		2
		歩	歩		歩	銀	歩	歩	3
歩	飛			歩		歩			4
	歩	角							5
歩		飛							6
		歩	歩	歩	歩	歩		歩	7
			銀	玉	銀				8
香	桂	金				金	桂	香	9

☗ pieces in hand: 歩歩
Rejecting rook trade
☖ pieces in hand: –

9	8	7	6	5	4	3	2	1
香	桂				王		桂	香	1
	飛		銀	金		金	角		2
		歩	歩		歩	銀	歩	歩	3
歩				歩		歩			4
	歩	角							5
歩		飛							6
		歩	歩	歩	歩	歩		歩	7
			銀	玉	銀				8
香	桂	金				金	桂	香	9

☗ pieces in hand: 歩歩

==== Accepting rook trade ====
Accepting rook trade
☖ pieces in hand: 飛 歩

9	8	7	6	5	4	3	2	1
香	桂				王		桂	香	1
			銀	金	銀	金	角		2
		歩	歩	歩	歩		歩	歩	3
歩						歩			4
									5
歩	飛								6
角		歩	歩	歩	歩	歩		歩	7
			銀	玉	銀				8
香	桂	金				金	桂	香	9

☗ pieces in hand: 歩歩
Accepting rook trade
☖ pieces in hand: 飛 歩

9	8	7	6	5	4	3	2	1
香	桂				王		桂	香	1
			銀	金	銀	金	角		2
		歩	歩	歩	歩		歩	歩	3
歩						歩			4
									5
歩	角								6
		歩	歩	歩	歩	歩		歩	7
			銀	玉	銀				8
香	桂	金				金	桂	香	9

☗ pieces in hand: 飛 歩歩

=== Early floating rook ===
Floating rook
☖ pieces in hand: –

9	8	7	6	5	4	3	2	1
香	桂	銀	金	王		銀	桂	香	1
	飛		銀				角		2
歩		歩	歩	歩	歩	歩	歩	歩	3
									4
	歩						歩		5
							飛		6
歩	歩	歩	歩	歩	歩	歩		歩	7
	角								8
香	桂	銀	金	玉	金	銀	桂	香	9

☗ pieces in hand: –

3. R-26. In this variation, Black dispenses with an initial rook trade and instead moves their rook into the floating rook (浮き飛車 ukibisha) position on rank 6. (Cf. the initial position of Buoyant Rook.)

== See also ==
- Static Rook
- Twisting Rook

== Bibliography ==
- 湯川, 博士 [in Japanese] (2015). 奇襲大全. マイナビ出版. ISBN 978-4-83995-787-2.
- "たのしく覚える奇襲戦法: アヒル戦法". 飯塚祐紀の中級講座. Episode 1. 銀河将棋チャンネル – via Niconico. (in Japanese)
