= Nakahara castle =

Nakahara Castle
☖ pieces in hand: –

9	8	7	6	5	4	3	2	1
									1
									2
									3
									4
									5
		歩							6
歩	歩		歩	歩	歩				7
		金			銀				8
香	桂	銀	玉	金					9

☗ pieces in hand: –

The Nakahara castle (Japanese: 中原囲い, romanized: Nakahara gakoi) is a type of shogi castle. Its application to modern shogi was made by professional player Makoto Nakahara. Nakahara won the Masuda Award in 1996 for his development of this strategy. The Nakahara castle is characterized by the close positioning of golds and silvers around the king. In particular, the castle involves the left gold at 78, the right silver at 48, and the right gold at the bottom rank, at 59, protecting the king at 69.

== Conception and evolution ==
The Nakahara castle was originally a castle in Nakahara Double Wing Attack. The original castle itself was a simple one in which the silver was pushed one square directly above from its initial position. The first game where this castle was played is said to have been the one between Nakahara and Teruichi Aono in April 1992, but Nakahara himself said that he had already used it in 1990.

Nakahara castle in
Double Wing attack
☖ pieces in hand: – 角 歩

9	8	7	6	5	4	3	2	1
香	桂						桂	香	1
	飛			金	王	金	銀		2
		歩	銀	歩	歩		歩		3
歩			歩			歩		歩	4
		歩							5
歩							飛	歩	6
		桂	歩	歩	歩	歩			7
	銀	金			銀				8
香			玉	金			桂	香	9

☗ pieces in hand: – 角 歩(2)

Nevertheless, the G-59 and K-69 positions themselves had already appeared in the old style of Double Wing Attack, and Nakahara had learned them from Yasujirō Kon, the master of his own master (Toshio Takayanagi). Nakahara applied this technique to modern era playing. At that time, it was a castle for Black. Incidentally, this castle can also be found in a shogi book explaining the Double Wing Attack style played in the Edo period.

However, this strategy started being gradually played by White. Nowadays, it is almost always used in combination with the Side Pawn Capture, Rook-85 strategy, so it has become a castling strategy used exclusively in White's turn. The formation involves S-22, G-32, K-41, G-51, and S-62. While it looks shabby, the formation is low and the king has a wide escape route regardless of what side it is attacked from. According to Nakahara, it is less resilient than the Central House, but because it has the gold in the back rank, it is strong against rook drop attacks and against knight's attacks. In addition, thanks to the simplicity of the formation it is easy to imitate and has become widely popular.

In recent years, there has been research on how to set up a Nakahara castle formation to strengthen the solidity of the king for Black's Side Pawn Capture, while a reversed Right Nakahara castle has been used, if rarely, in Double Ranging Rook games.

The diagram shows the Nakahara castle for Black. The characteristic of this formation is not defending the 87 square with a pawn, and to battle strongly by using the pawn at 96 and the knight at 77. As can be seen, since Black has two pawns in hand, the variations of the attack can be expanded.

As an example of how to attack here, Black can start a swift attack with P-95, which will be followed by ...Px95, but then P*92. At this point, if ...Rx92, then R-86, P*82; P*93, Nx93; B*81, and if instead White captures with ...Lx92, then B*91, R-83; P*85, with the aim of P-86 in the next move.

Various other moves can also be attempted, such as N-77, without exchanging bishops, and then moving the rook from 25 to 85 to make the rooks collide.

Another well-known example is to attack with P-36 and N-37, and then after P-35, if White goes with Px35, attacking along the 1st and 3rd files with P-15.
