= Deceiver =

Deceiver, Deceivers, The Deceiver or The Deceivers may refer to:

== Books ==
- Deceiver (novel), a 2010 novel by C. J. Cherryh
- The Deceiver (novel), a novel by Frederick Forsyth
- The Deceivers (Aiello novel), a 1999 novel by Robert Aiello
- The Deceivers (Bester novel), a 1981 novel by Alfred Bester
- The Deceivers (Masters novel), a 1952 novel by John Masters
- The Deceivers: Allied Military Deception in the Second World War, a 2010 book by Thaddeus Holt

== Film and TV ==
- The Deceiver (1920 film), an American Arrow Film Corporation drama film directed by Jean Hersholt and Lewis H. Moomaw
- The Deceiver (film), a 1931 film directed by Louis King
- The Deceivers (film), a 1988 adventure film starring Pierce Brosnan
- Deceiver (film), a 1997 film starring Tim Roth

== Music ==
- Deceiver (Chris Thile album)
- Deceiver (The Word Alive album)
- Deceiver (Muslimgauze album)
- Deceiver (DIIV album)
- Deceivers (album), a 2022 album by Arch Enemy

=== Songs ===
- "La engañadora" ("The Deceiver"), a cha-cha-chá written by Enrique Jorrín (1953)
- "The Deceiver", a song by The Alarm (1984)
- "Deceiver", a song from the album Sad Wings of Destiny by Judas Priest (1976)
- "Deceiver", a song from the album Indestructible by Disturbed (2008)
- "Deceiver", a song from the album Get What You Give by The Ghost Inside (2012)
- "Deceiver", a song from the album Baptized in Filth by Impending Doom (2012)
- "Deceiver", a song from the album Immortal Legacy by Hirax (2014)
- "Deceiver", a song from the album OMNI by The Browning (2024)

=== Musicians ===
- Deceiver, the former name of the American metal band Believer

== Other ==
- The Deceiver (fungus) or Laccaria laccata, a mushroom
- Buoyant Rook or Deceiver, a shogi opening

== See also ==
- The Great Deceiver (disambiguation)
