= Shōji Segawa =

Japanese shogi player

- Native name: 瀬川晶司
- Born: March 23, 1970 (age 55)
- Hometown: Yokohama

Career
- Achieved professional status: November 6, 2005 (aged 35)
- Badge Number: 259
- Rank: 6-dan
- Teacher: Terutaka Yasue (8-dan)
- Meijin class: C2
- Ryūō class: 5

Websites
- JSA profile page
- Official website

Shōji Segawa (瀬川 晶司, Segawa Shōji; born March 23, 1970) is a Japanese professional shogi player ranked 6-dan. Segawa is known for becoming a professional player without being promoted by winning the 3-dan tournament within the professional apprenticeship program, which subsequently led to Japan Shogi Association establishing the Professional Admission Test as way for amateurs who are not apprentice professionals to obtain professional status. The 2018 movie The Miracle of Crybaby Shottan is based on Segawa's 2006 autobiography of the same name.

Segawa is also an executive director of the JSA.

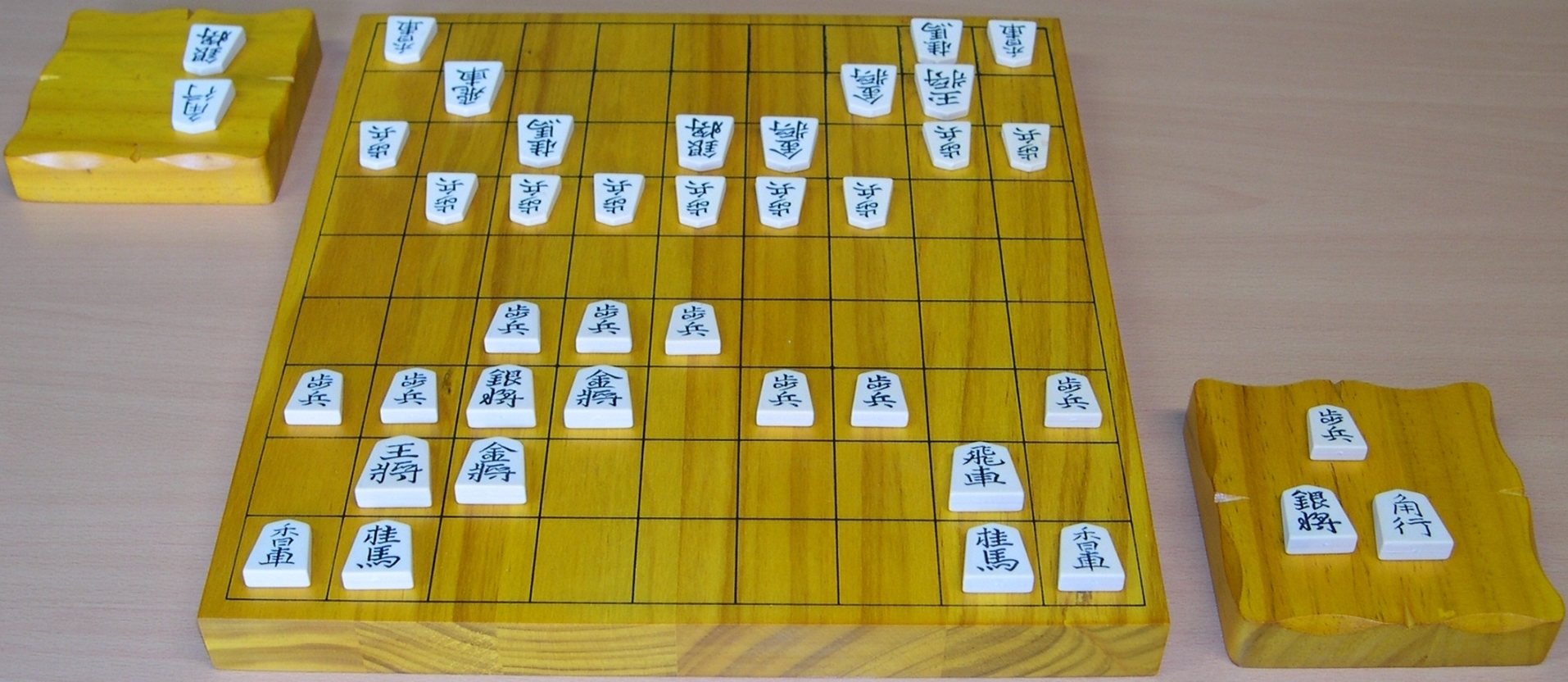
Shogi board pieces and komadai

== Becoming a professional shogi player ==
Segawa was a 3-dan ranked apprentice shogi professional, but was unable to gain promotion to 4-dan professional before turning 26 in 1996. Thus, per the association's rules, he was required to withdraw from its apprentice school. Segawa continued to play shogi as an amateur and won a number of national amateur tournaments which allowed him to qualify for entry into professional shogi tournaments. Segawa's record of 17 wins and 7 losses against professionals in these tournaments led him to request that the association grant him another opportunity to become a professional. The JSA discussed Segawa's petition at its annual general meeting in May 2005, and the membership voted 129 to 52 to grant him a special exception to attempt to become a professional.

The JSA arranged for him to play six games against a variety of professional opponents, stating that he would be granted 4-dan professional status if he won three games. Segawa's opponents were to be four professional players (Hiromitsu Kanki, Toshiaki Kubo and Makoto Nakahara and Kunio Yonenaga), one female professional player (Hiroe Nakai), and one apprentice school 3-dan (Amahiko Satō).

The games were held from July to November 2005. Segawa lost Game One against Satō, won Game Two against Kanki, lost Game Three against Kubo, and then won Game Four against Nakai. His opponent for Game Five was originally scheduled to be Nakahara, but he was replaced by Hideyuki Takano. Segawa defeated Takano to achieve the necessary third win on November 6, 2005 and was granted professional status by the JSA on the same day. He became the first person in 61 years to obtain professional status via test shogi.

As a result of Segawa's successful attempt to become professional, the matter was re-discussed by the JSA members during the association's annual general meeting in May 2006, and the membership voted 154 in favor to 34 against to create a formal way for other strong amateurs to obtain professional status called the "Professional Admission Test" (プロ編入試験 (Puro Henyū Shiken)).

== Shogi professional ==
=== Promotion history ===
The promotion history of Segawa is as follows:

- 4-dan: November 6, 2005
- 5-dan: August 13, 2012
- 6-dan: November 8, 2018

== JSA director ==
Segawa was elected an executive director of the JSA at its 76th General Meeting in June 2025.

== The Miracle of Crybaby Shotan ==
In 2006, Segawa released his autobiography titled The Miracle of Crybaby Shottan. The book was later adapted into a 2018 movie of the same name directed by Toshiaki Toyoda.
