= Shadow in the Mirror =

2001 novel by Robert Aiello

- Author: Robert Aiello
- Language: English
- Publisher: Creative Arts Book Company
- Publication date: 2001
- Publication place: United States
- Media type: Print (paperback)
- Pages: 247
- ISBN: 0-88739-345-4
- OCLC: 47250206
- Preceded by: The Deceivers
- Followed by: The Desperate Hours

Shadow in the Mirror is a crime novel by the American writer Robert Aiello set in contemporary Pittsburgh, Pennsylvania.

The story opens when an identical twin⎯a flame from Grant Montgomery's past⎯reenters his life, and he is soon implicated in the murder of the twins’ father, an old friend and mentor. Montgomery, the mentalist, must uncover a secret to reveal the murderer, but he is threatened by a beautiful psychopath who wants his love or his demise and a sadistic criminal with a score to settle.
