= Karolina Fortin =

Polish shogi player (born 1991)

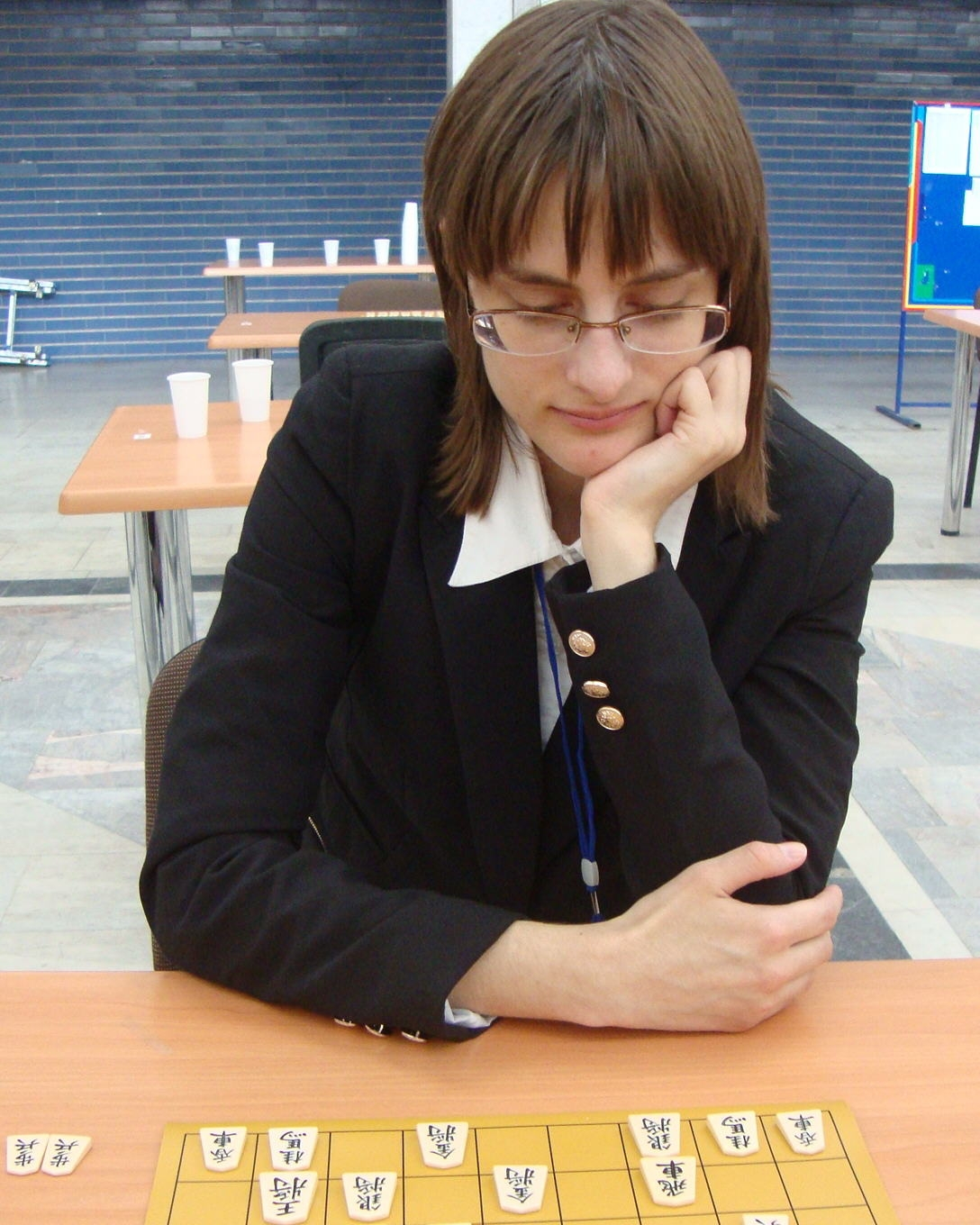
- Styczyńska at the World Open Shogi Championship in 2013
- Maiden name: Styczyńska
- Born: June 17, 1991 (age 34)
- Hometown: Warsaw

Career
- Achieved professional status: April 1, 2017 (aged 25)
- Badge number: W-59
- Rank: Women's 2-dan
- Retired: March 31, 2023 (aged 31)
- Teacher: Daisuke Katagami (7-dan)
- Career record: 36–50 (.419)

Websites
- JSA profile page
- https://shogiismylife.wordpress.com/

Karolina Fortin (née Styczyńska (Polish: [stɨˈtʂɨj̃ska]), Japanese: カロリーナ・ステチェンスカ; born June 17, 1991) is a retired Polish women's professional shogi player who achieved the rank of 2-dan. (Note: At the time of her retirement in March 2023, Fortin was ranked 1-dan but was subsequently promoted to 2-dan in April 2026 by the JSA) She is the first non-Japanese to be awarded professional status by the Japan Shogi Association.

== Shogi ==
=== Amateur ===
Styczyńska started playing shogi as a teenager after seeing the game depicted in an issue of the Japanese manga Naruto. She learned the rules of the game on the Internet, then began studying on her own using online materials and videos.

She began playing online games at a website called 81Dojo, where her strong play was eventually noticed by women's professional Madoka Kitao. Kitao was impressed by Styczyńska's ability and invited her to come to Japan for a two-week trip to study shogi in 2011. After arriving in Tokyo, Styczyńska was given a test at the headquarters of the Japan Shogi Association and awarded the rank of amateur 4-dan.

Styczyńska was invited to participate as the tournament's non-Japanese representative in Tokyo in the preliminary round of the 2nd Ricoh Cup Women's Oza Tournament on May 19, 2012. Although she did not advance beyond the preliminary round, she became the first non-Japanese female amateur to defeat a women's professional in an official game.

She was again selected to be the non-Japanese representative for the 3rd Ricoh Cup Women's Oza Tournament held in May 2013. As in the previous year, she was unable to advance beyond the preliminary round, but was able to defeat a women's professional for the second time.

==== Major tournament results ====
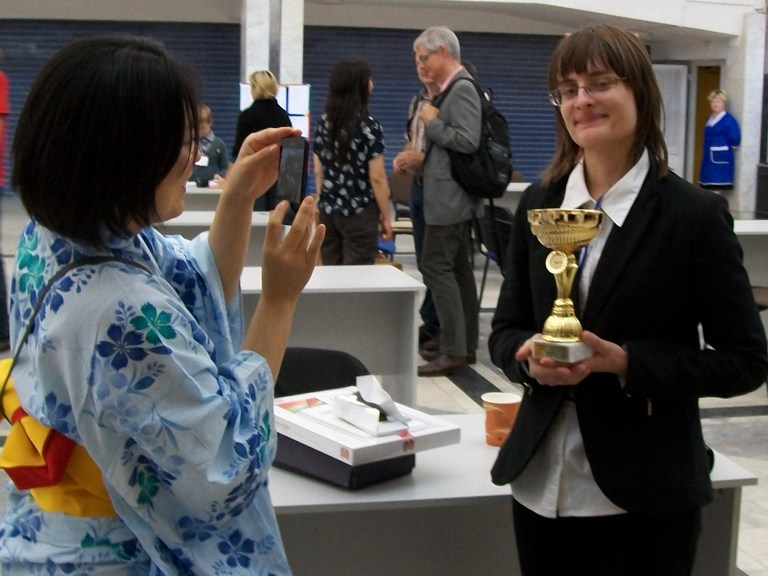
Styczyńska and trophy with Madoka Kitao

Year	Level	Tournament	Place	References
2009	Amateur	European Championship, World Shogi Open Championship	15th	
2010	Amateur	European Championship, World Shogi Open Championship	5th	
2011	Amateur	European Championship, World Shogi Open Championship	11th	
2013	Amateur	European Championship, World Shogi Open Championship	4th	
2013	Amateur	26th Japan Amateur Ryu-oh Tournament	Preliminary round	
2014	Amateur	European Championship, World Shogi Open Championship	1st	

==== Training group member ====
In June 2013, Styczyńska became the first non-Japanese female to be accepted into one of the Japan Shogi Association's training groups. Her test consisted of eight games against members of various training groups and she finished with an overall record of three wins and five losses. Based upon this result and the strength of her opponents, the JSA accepted her into the C2 training group. Her participation in the C2 group was delayed until the following October to allow her to graduate from college back in Poland. On October 1, she officially began play in the C2 training group.

=== Professional ===
Styczyńska was promoted to the C1 training group in June 2015, which qualified her to be awarded the provisional women's professional rank of 3-kyū. She submitted an official request to receive the rank and her promotion became official on October 1, 2015. Following a win against Minami Sadamasu in a preliminary game of the 44th Women’s Meijin tournament in Tokyo she was promoted to 2-kyū on February 20, 2017, thus becoming the first non-Japanese to be awarded full professional status.

Styczyńska's first win as a professional came on March 16, 2017; it was her second official game since becoming a professional. She was promoted to women's professional 1-kyū on April 1, 2017, for winning seven or more official games during the shogi year April 1, 2016 to March 31, 2017. On April 1, 2021, she was promoted to the rank of women's professional 1-dan for achieving the required number of wins (eight or more) need to earn promotion to 1-dan during the 2020–2021 shogi year.

On August 11, 2021, the JSA announced on its official website that Styczyńska had been granted an official leave of absence from August 11, 2021, until March 31, 2022. The JSA's announcement only stated that the leave was being granted for personal reasons. Styczyńska tweeted later that same day that she "will be taking a break and coming back abroad" and would be "leaving at the end of this month", but gave no further details; Chunichi News, however, tweeted something as well that the reason Styczyńska's decided to take official leave was due to concerns about not being able to return home to see her family due to COVID-19 making international travel difficult.

Fortin's retirement as a women's professional shogi player was announced by the JSA on April 3, 2023. The JSA stated she had submitted her retirement papers and they were officially processed on March 31, 2023. In a blog post published on the same day, Fortin stated she had decided to remain in Europe for family reasons and thus would not be returning to Japan to continue her career as a women's professional shogi player. Fortin stated that she would continue her efforts to teach and promote shogi outside of Japan. Fortin's record as a women's professional was 36 wins and 50 losses for a winning percentage of 0.4186.

==== Promotion history ====
Styczyńska's promotion history is as follows:

- 3-kyū: October 1, 2015
- 2-kyū: February 20, 2017
- 1-kyū: April 1, 2017
- 1-dan: April 1, 2021
- Retired: March 31, 2023
- 2-dan: April 1, 2026

Note: All ranks are women's professional ranks.

== Media appearances ==
Styczyńska was one of three opponents chosen to play exhibition games against 62nd NHK Cup champion Akira Watanabe on NHK-E's 2014 New Year's Shogi Special.

She also served as assistant commentator for Dwango's Niconico English web broadcast of Game 2 of the 2nd Eiō Championship in December 2016.

On March 28, 2017, Styczyńska appeared on Nippon TV's Genki no Apuri program. She was interviewed about her reasons for starting to play shogi and the preparation she undertook to becoming a shogi professional as well as the difficulties she faced getting used to sitting seiza-style during professional games.

In April 2018, Otsuka Pharmaceutical announced that they had agreed to sponsor Styczyńska and use her in a promotional campaign for the company's CalorieMate products. Part of the campaign included a web anime about Styczyńska's experience in becoming a professional shogi player titled Go, Karolina (Japanese: すすめ, カロリーナ, Hepburn: Susume, Karolīna) which was directed by Mateusz Urbanowicz and produced by Studio Colorido. Three versions of the web anime were officially released in June 2018.

== Personal life ==
Styczyńska enrolled in Yamanashi Gakuin University in Kōfu, Yamanashi Prefecture after moving to Japan in 2013. In March 2018, she finished her master's thesis and graduated. She lived in Kōfu during her time as a student, but moved to Tokyo after graduating. Her hobbies are computers, manga, and music.

Styczyńska was named a goodwill ambassador for the city of Kōfu in March 2016.

On September 12, 2022, the JSA posted on its official website that Styczyńska had gotten married in August 2022 and would now be active professionally under her married name "Fortin". After getting married, Fortin and her husband based themselves out of Switzerland.
