= Double Ranging Rook =

Shogi opening

In shogi, Double Ranging Rook (also Double Swinging Rook, Mutual Swinging Rook) (相振り飛車 ai-furibisha) is a class of Ranging Rook openings in which both players choose a Ranging Rook position.

The term does not apply when one player (or both) moves their rook to their respective fourth or third files (Right Fourth File Rook, Sleeve Rook) as these are still considered to be Static Rook positions.

Double Ranging Rook games were relatively rare compared with Double Static Rook and Static Rook vs Ranging Rook games. However, more recently, they have gained in popularity somewhat as Fairbairn noted in the 1980s.

The most often played game among professionals is Black's Opposing Rook vs White's Third File Rook.

== Opposing Rook vs Third File Rook ==
Opposing vs Third
☖ pieces in hand: –

9	8	7	6	5	4	3	2	1
香	桂	銀	金	王	金	銀	桂	香	1
						飛	角		2
歩	歩	歩	歩	歩	歩		歩	歩	3
						歩			4
									5
		歩	歩						6
歩	歩			歩	歩	歩	歩	歩	7
	角						飛		8
香	桂	銀	金	玉	金	銀	桂	香	9

☗ pieces in hand: –

1. P-76 P-34.

2. P-66.

2...R-32.

=== Opposing Rook's early eighth pawn advance variation ===
3. B-77.

=== Opposing Rook's left silver development ===
3. S-78.

==== Third File Rook's Mino castle with delayed 35 pawn push variation ====
Opposing vs Third
☖ pieces in hand: –

9	8	7	6	5	4	3	2	1
香	桂	王	金				桂	香	1
		銀		金		飛	角		2
歩	歩	歩	歩	銀	歩		歩	歩	3
				歩		歩			4
	歩								5
		歩	歩						6
歩		角	銀	歩	歩	歩	歩	歩	7
	飛			金	玉				8
香	桂				金	銀	桂	香	9

☗ pieces in hand: –

3...K-62.

4. S-67.

4...S-72. Here White starts to create the Mino castle structure giving up the possibility of making a Bear-in-the-hole castle.

5. B-77. Moving up the bishop to the seventh file allows a space on the 88 square for the rook to move to. Additionally, the bishop needs to be defended by the left knight as left silver and left gold will eventually be moved to different locations.

5...K-71. The king hunkers down.

6. R-88.

6...S-42.

7. P-86.

7...P-54.

8. P-85.

8...S-53.

9. K-48.

9...G49-52.

9. G69-58.

===== Transpositions =====
The opening position above can be reached by different move sequences, some of which are shown below.

	Black	White	Black	White
1.	P-76	P-34	P-76	P-34
2.	P-66	R-32	P-66	P-56
3.	B-77	K-62	S-78	S-42
4.	S-78	S-72	S-67	S-53
5.	S-67	K-71	B-77	R-32
6.	R-88	S-42	R-88	K-62
7.	P-86	P-54	P-86	S-72
8.	P-85	S-53	P-85	K-71
9.	K-48	G49-52	K-48	G41-52
10.	G69-58		G69-58

== Third File Rook vs Opposing Rook ==
=== Ishida vs Opposing Rook Early P14 ===
Ishida vs Opposing
☖ pieces in hand: –

9	8	7	6	5	4	3	2	1
香	桂	銀	金	王	金	銀	桂	香	1
	飛						角		2
歩	歩	歩	歩	歩	歩		歩		3
						歩		歩	4
		歩							5
									6
歩	歩		歩	歩	歩	歩	歩	歩	7
	角						飛		8
香	桂	銀	金	玉	金	銀	桂	香	9

☗ pieces in hand: –
Ishida vs Opposing
☖ pieces in hand: –

9	8	7	6	5	4	3	2	1
香	桂	銀	金	王	金		桂	香	1
					銀		飛		2
歩	歩	歩	歩		歩				3
				歩	角	歩		歩	4
		歩					歩		5
			歩					歩	6
歩	歩		銀	歩	歩	歩	歩		7
	角	飛			玉		銀		8
香	桂		金		金		桂	香	9

☗ pieces in hand: –

1. P76 P34, 2. P75. Ishida position by Black.

2...P14. White's early edge pawn push.

Black closing their bishop diagonal and aims for the Gold Excelsior castle.

Ishida vs Opposing
☖ pieces in hand: –

9	8	7	6	5	4	3	2	1
香	桂		金	王	金			香	1
		銀			銀		飛		2
歩	歩	歩	歩		歩	桂			3
				歩	角	歩		歩	4
		歩							5
			歩				歩	歩	6
歩	歩		銀	歩	歩	歩	歩		7
	角	飛		金		玉	銀		8
香	桂				金		桂	香	9

☗ pieces in hand: –
Ishida vs Opposing
☖ pieces in hand: 歩

9	8	7	6	5	4	3	2	1
香	桂		金	王	金		飛	香	1
		銀			銀				2
歩	歩	歩	歩		歩	桂			3
				歩	角	歩			4
		歩						歩	5
			歩					歩	6
歩	歩		銀	歩	歩	歩	歩		7
	角	飛		金	金	玉	銀		8
香	桂						桂	香	9

☗ pieces in hand: –

White aims for a Mino castle and develops the left knight for attacking.

A left edge attack may be possible for White.

Game example: Toshiaki Kubo vs Hisashi Namekata's Meijin ranking tournament on March 15, 2015.

== Fourth File to Third File Rook ==
4→3戦法

The player starts off playing a Fourth File Rook position with an open bishop diagonal that then transitions to a Third File Rook position after the player moves their king into an Incomplete Mino castle. This strategy is flexible to be used against a Ranging Rook opponent (for a Double Ranging Rook game) as well as against a Static Rook opponent.

== See also ==
- Ranging Rook

== Bibliography ==
- Fairbairn, John (1986). Shogi for beginners (2nd ed.). Ishi Press. ISBN 978-4-8718-720-10.
- Fujii, Takeshi 2007 相振り飛車を指しこなす本. Vol. 1.
- Fujii, Takeshi 2007 相振り飛車を指しこなす本. Vol. 2.
- Fujii, Takeshi 2008 相振り飛車を指しこなす本. Vol. 3.
- Fujii, Takeshi 2008 相振り飛車を指しこなす本. Vol. 4.
- Hosking, Tony (1996). The art of shogi. The Shogi Foundation. ISBN 978-0-95310-890-9.
- Kitao, Madoka (2011). Joseki at a glance. Translated by Kawasaki, Tomohide. Nekomado. ISBN 978-4-9052-2501-0.
- 将棋世界 [Shōgi Sekai] (2016). 相振り飛車: 常識の手筋. マイナビ出版.
- 所司 [Shoshi], 和晴 [Kazuharu] (2014). 早分かり: 相振り飛車定跡ガイド. マイナビ出版. ISBN 978-4-8399-5373-7.
- 髙﨑 [Takazaki], 一生 [Issei] (2015). わかる!勝てる!!: 現代相振り飛車. マイナビ出版. ISBN 978-4-8399-5469-7.
- 戸辺 [Tobe], 誠 [Makoto] (2013). 振り飛車4→3戦法. マイナビ出版.
