= Twisting Rook =

Shōgi opening strategy

Twisting Rook:
Initial Static Rook position
☖ pieces in hand: –

9	8	7	6	5	4	3	2	1
香	桂		金	王		銀	桂	香	1
	飛		銀				角		2
歩		歩	歩	歩	歩	金	歩		3
						歩		歩	4
	歩								5
歩		歩				飛		歩	6
	歩		歩	歩	歩	歩			7
	角	金				銀			8
香	桂	銀		玉	金		桂	香	9

☗ pieces in hand: 歩
Twisting Rook:
Possible Ranging Rook position
☖ pieces in hand: 歩

9	8	7	6	5	4	3	2	1
香	桂		金		王		桂	香	1
	飛				銀		角		2
歩		歩	銀	歩	歩	金	歩		3
			歩			歩		歩	4
	歩	歩							5
歩		飛						歩	6
角		桂	歩	歩	歩	歩			7
		金			玉	銀			8
香		銀			金		桂	香	9

☗ pieces in hand: 歩

The Twisting Rook (ひねり飛車 hineribisha) opening strategy is characterized by first playing a Static Rook opening, which then switches to a Ranging Rook strategy with the rook positioned in front of one's camp.

Twisting Rook is related to the Rook On Pawn opening (縦歩取り tate fudori), which often transitions into Twisting Rook.

One possible aim of Twisting Rook is to achieve an offensive structure similar to the attacking formation used in an Ishida opening.

== See also ==
- Rook on Pawn
- Ranging Rook
- Static Rook

== Bibliography ==
- Fairbairn, John (1986). Shogi for beginners (2nd ed.). Ishi Press. ISBN 978-4-8718-720-10.
- Hosking, Tony (1996). The art of shogi. The Shogi Foundation. ISBN 978-0-95310-890-9.
- Kitao, Madoka (2011). Joseki at a glance. Translated by Kawasaki, Tomohide. Nekomado. ISBN 978-4-9052-2501-0.
