= Daisuke Katagami =

Japanese shogi player (born 1981)

- Native name: 片上大輔
- Born: August 28, 1981 (age 43)
- Hometown: Hiroshima

Career
- Achieved professional status: April 1, 2004 (aged 22)
- Badge Number: 251
- Rank: 7-dan
- Teacher: Nobuo Mori (7-dan)
- Meijin class: C1
- Ryūō class: 5
- Notable students: Karolina Styczyńska

Websites
- JSA profile page
- Official website

Daisuke Katagami (片上 大輔, Katagami Daisuke; born August 28, 1981) is a Japanese professional shogi player ranked 7-dan. He is an executive director of the Japan Shogi Association.

== Early life and apprenticeship ==
Katagami was born in Hiroshima on August 28, 1981. He was accepted into the Japan Shogi Association's apprentice school at the rank of 6-kyū under the guidance of shogi professional Nobuo Mori in September 1993, promoted to the rank of 1-dan in March 1996, and was awarded full professional status and the rank of 4-dan in April 2004 after winning the 34th 3-dan League (October 2003 – March 2004) with a record of 16 wins and 2 losses.

== Shogi professional ==
=== Promotion history ===
Katagami's promotion history is as follows:

- 6-kyū: 1993
- 1-dan: 1996
- 4-dan: April 1, 2004
- 5-dan: October 10, 2006
- 6-dan: May 12, 2009
- 7-dan: July 18, 2018

== JSA director ==
Katagami is a member of the Japan Shogi Association's board of directors. He was first elected to a two-year term as a director at the association's 64th General Meeting in June 2013, and elevated to executive director at the 66th General Meeting in June 2015. Near the end of his second term, however, Katagami was one of three board members voted out of office by the JSA membership at an emergency meeting held in February 2017 for their involvement in the 29th Ryūō challenger controversy.

Katagami was re-elected as an executive director in June 2023 and for another two-year term in June 2025.

== Personal life ==
In February 2006, the JSA announced on its official website the engagement of Katagami to women's professional Madoka Kitao.

On June 12, 2016, Katagami posted on his personal blog that he had gotten divorced some time ago, and that he had gotten married again to someone else about two months earlier. The following day, Kitao tweeted that she and Katagami had gotten divorced about two years earlier in response; her tweet included a link to Katagami's blog post.
