= Buoyant Rook =

Shogi opening in which the rook moves forward

Buoyant Rook
☖ pieces in hand: –

9	8	7	6	5	4	3	2	1
香	桂	銀	金	王	金	銀	桂	香	1
	飛								2
歩	歩	歩	歩	歩	歩	角	歩	歩	3
						歩			4
							歩		5
							飛		6
歩	歩	歩	歩	歩	歩	歩		歩	7
	角								8
香	桂	銀	金	玉	金	銀	桂	香	9

☗ pieces in hand: –

In shogi, Buoyant Rook (浮き浮き飛車 or ウキウキ飛車 ukiukibisha) or the Deceiver (目くらまし me kuramashi or 浮き飛車目くらまし ukibisha me kuramashi) is a surprise Static Rook opening in which the player's rook is advanced to the file directly above their line of pawns (rank 6 for Black or rank 4 for White) behind an advanced rook pawn.

Once positioned on this rank, the player threatens to capture with their rook any pawns that are advanced by their opponent.

The term float (浮く uku) is used to refer to the positioning of the rook on rank 6 or 4 where it is undefended. A rook in this position is known as a floating rook (浮き飛車 ukibisha) as in, for instance, the Double Wing Attack Floating Rook opening (相掛かり浮き飛車 aigakari ukibisha). The word 浮き浮き ukiuki means light-hearted or cheery as if metaphorically floating.

== Development ==
Buoyant Rook
☖ pieces in hand: –

9	8	7	6	5	4	3	2	1
香	桂	銀	金	王	金	銀	桂	香	1
	飛						角		2
歩	歩	歩	歩	歩	歩		歩	歩	3
						歩			4
							歩		5
									6
歩	歩	歩	歩	歩	歩	歩		歩	7
	角						飛		8
香	桂	銀	金	玉	金	銀	桂	香	9

☗ pieces in hand: –
Buoyant Rook
☖ pieces in hand: –

9	8	7	6	5	4	3	2	1
香	桂	銀	金	王	金	銀	桂	香	1
	飛								2
歩	歩	歩	歩	歩	歩	角	歩	歩	3
						歩			4
							歩		5
							飛		6
歩	歩	歩	歩	歩	歩	歩		歩	7
	角								8
香	桂	銀	金	玉	金	銀	桂	香	9

☗ pieces in hand: –

1. P-26 P-34, 2. P-25.

2. ...B-33. If White wants to prevent a pawn exchange on the second file, they must move the bishop to the third file to protect the 24 square. This move will also allow White to develop a Ranging Rook position.

3. R-26. This is the unexpected floating of the rook to the rank 6 that characterizes the Buoyant Rook opening.

At this point, White has a choice between a Static Rook and a Ranging Rook response.

=== Against Ranging Rook ===
Buoyant Rook vs Ranging Rook
☖ pieces in hand: –

9	8	7	6	5	4	3	2	1
香	桂	銀	金	王	金	銀	桂	香	1
						飛			2
歩	歩	歩	歩	歩	歩	角	歩	歩	3
						歩			4
							歩		5
							飛		6
歩	歩	歩	歩	歩	歩	歩		歩	7
	角								8
香	桂	銀	金	玉	金	銀	桂	香	9

☗ pieces in hand: –
Buoyant Rook vs Ranging Rook
☖ pieces in hand: –

9	8	7	6	5	4	3	2	1
香	桂	銀	金	王	金	銀	桂	香	1
						飛			2
歩	歩	歩	歩	歩	歩	角	歩	歩	3
						歩			4
							歩		5
						飛			6
歩	歩	歩	歩	歩	歩	歩		歩	7
	角								8
香	桂	銀	金	玉	金	銀	桂	香	9

☗ pieces in hand: –

=== Against Static Rook ===
Buoyant Rook vs Static Rook
☖ pieces in hand: –

9	8	7	6	5	4	3	2	1
香	桂	銀	金	王	金	銀	桂	香	1
	飛								2
歩		歩	歩	歩	歩	角	歩	歩	3
	歩					歩			4
							歩		5
						飛			6
歩	歩	歩	歩	歩	歩	歩		歩	7
	角								8
香	桂	銀	金	玉	金	銀	桂	香	9

☗ pieces in hand: –

3. ...P-84. Static Rook.

== See also ==
- Rook on Pawn
- Static Rook

== Bibliography ==
- 湯川, 博士 [in Japanese] (2015). 奇襲大全. マイナビ出版. ISBN 978-4-83995-787-2.
- Kitao, Madoka (2011). Joseki at a glance. Translated by Kawasaki, Tomohide. Nekomado. ISBN 978-4-9052-2501-0.
