= Flatfish (shogi) =

Flatfish Castle
☖ pieces in hand: –

9	8	7	6	5	4	3	2	1
									1
									2
									3
									4
									5
		歩						歩	6
		桂	歩		歩	歩	歩		7
			銀	飛		銀	玉		8
				金	金		桂	香	9

☗ pieces in hand: –

In shogi, Flatfish (olive flounder, 平目 hirame) is a Central Rook (Ranging Rook) opening.

It characteristically uses the Flatfish castle (平目囲い or ヒラメ囲い hiramegakoi) instead of the more usual Mino castle.

== See also ==
- Central Rook
- Central Rook Silver Horns
- Cheerful Central Rook
- Ranging Rook
