= Teruichi Aono =

Japanese shogi player (born 1953)

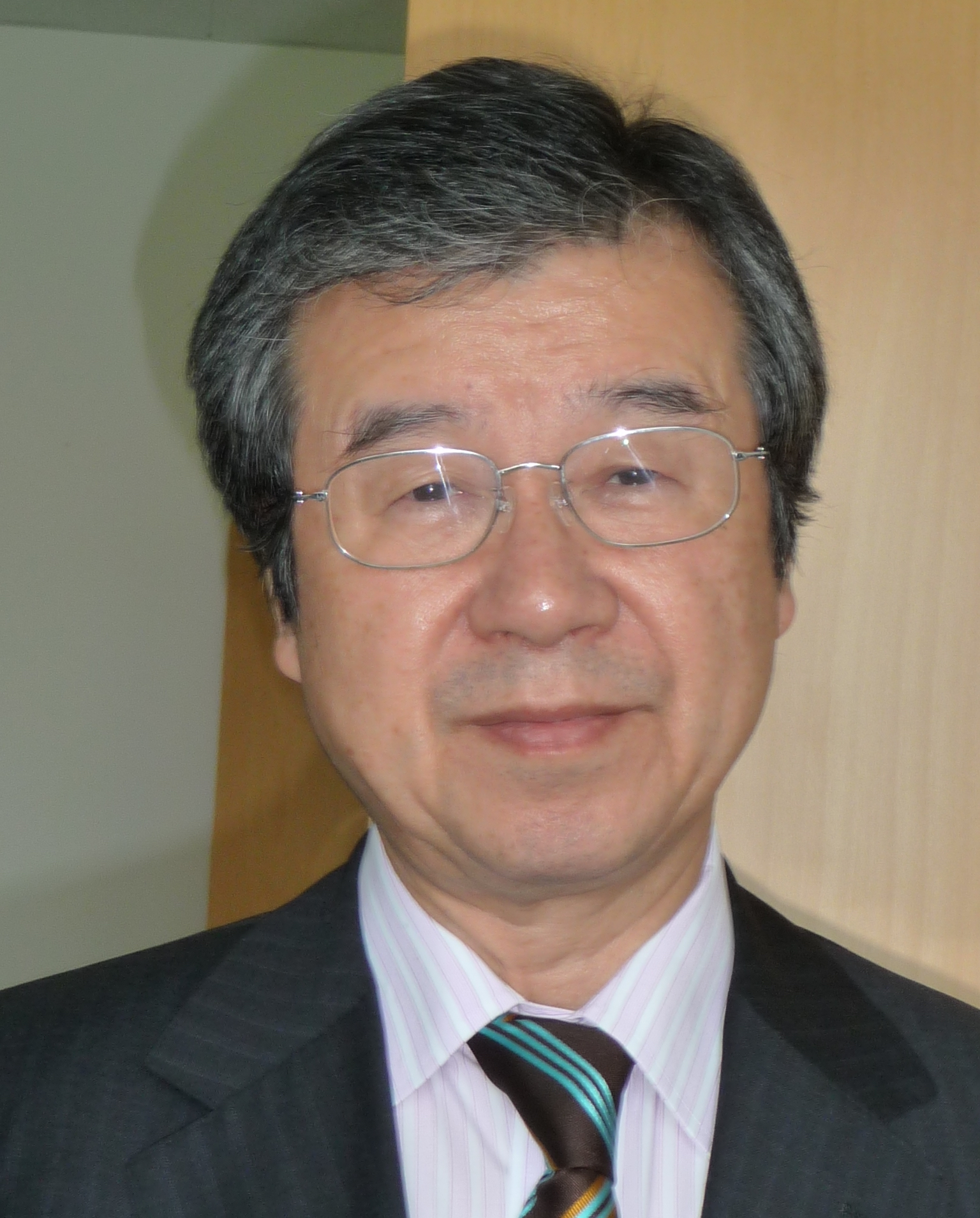
- Native name: 青野照市
- Born: January 31, 1953 (age 72)
- Hometown: Yaizu, Shizuoka

Career
- Achieved professional status: April 1, 1974 (aged 21)
- Badge Number: 114
- Rank: 9-dan
- Retired: June 13, 2024 (aged 71)
- Teacher: Hirotsu Hisao (9-dan)
- Tournaments won: 4
- Career record: 800–899 (.471)
- Notable students: Akira Nishio; Wataru Yashiro; Fusako Ajiki

Websites
- JSA profile page

Teruichi Aono (青野 照市, Aono Teruichi; born January 1, 1953) is a Japanese retired professional shogi player from Yaizu, Shizuoka who achieved the rank of 9-dan.

== Shogi professional ==
In February 2024, Aono became the 26th player to win 800 official games as a professional and was awarded the "Shogi Honor Fighting-spirit Award" as a result. He is, at age 71, the oldest ever to achieve this result, but he is also, the first to do so while having a winning percentage below 50 percent (his career record after the game was 800 wins and 895 losses) at the time.

In April 2024, the JSA announced Aono had met the conditions for mandatory retirement for "Free Class" players and his retirement would become official upon completion of his final scheduled game of the 2024–2025 shogi season. Aono's retirement became official on June 13, 2024, after his loss to Masaki Izumi in a 37th Ryūō Group 6 game. Aono finished his career with a record of 800 wins and 899 losses for a winning percentage of 0.471.

=== Promotion history ===
The promotion history of Aono is as follows:

- 4-kyū: 1968
- 1-dan: 1970
- 4-dan: April 1, 1974
- 5-dan: April 1, 1976
- 6-dan: April 1, 1979
- 7-dan: April 1, 1980
- 8-dan: April 1, 1983
- 9-dan: August 5, 1994
- Retired: June 13, 2024

=== Titles and other championships ===
Aono challenged Makoto Nakahara for the 37th Ōza title in 1989 for his only appearance in a major title match. He has, however, won four non-major shogi championships during his career: the 5th and 10th Shinjin-Ō titles (1974 and 1979); the 5th Meiki-sen (1978); and the 7th-8th All Star Kachinuki-sen (1984–85).

=== Awards and honors ===
Aono has received a number of awards for shogi. These include the "Best Winning Percentage" and "Best New Player" awards in 1975, the "Most Consecutive Games Won" award in 1978, and the Kōzō Masuda Award in 1997 and 2017.

In 2011, his efforts in using shogi to promote cultural exchange between Japan and other countries were recognized by the Japanese Ministry of Foreign Affairs and he was awarded the Foreign Minister's Commendation. for Fiscal Year 2011.

In February 2024, Aono was awarded the "Shogi Honor Fighting-spirit Award" in recognition of winning 800 official games as a professional.

==== Annual Shogi Awards ====
- 3rd Annual Awards (April 1975 – March 1976): Best New Player, Best Winning Percentage
- 6th Annual Awards (April 1978 – March 1979): Most Consecutive Games Won
- 25th Annual Awards (April 1997 – March 1998): Kōzō Masuda Award
- 45th Annual Awards (April 2017 – March 2018): Kōzō Masuda Award

==== Other awards ====
Aono has also received the following other awards.

- 1993, February: Japan Foundation 20th Anniversary Commemorative Letter of Appreciation
- 1998: 25 Years Service Award (Awarded by the JSA in recognition of being an active professional for twenty-five years)
- 2000: Shogi Honor Fighting-spirit Award (Awarded by JSA in recognition of winning 600 official games as a professional)
- 2000, December: Shizuoka Prefecture Award
- 2011, July: Japanese Foreign Minister's Commendation
- 2013: 40 Years Service Award (Awarded by the JSA in recognition of being an active professional for forty years)
- 2023: 50 Years Service Award (Awarded by the JSA in recognition of being an active professional for fifty years)
- 2024: "Shogi Honor Fighting-spirit Award" (Awarded by JSA in recognition of winning 800 official games as a professional)

== JSA executive ==
Aono has been selected multiple times to be a member of the Japan Shogi Association's board of directors throughout his career, and was chosen to be JSA senior managing director in 2013. He served in that capacity until February 2017 when he and two other members of the board were dismissed as part of the JSA's response to the 29th Ryūō challenger controversy.

== Shogi promotion efforts ==
Aono is active in promoting shogi outside Japan including visiting England in 1979 to teach the game to local players, and helping to arrange a visit of twenty Chinese elementary school students from Shanghai to visit an elementary school in Sendagaya, Tokyo in 2015 as part of an international exchange program involving shogi.

== 9-square shogi ==
Aono created a new shogi variant 9マス将棋 kyū-masu shōgi "9-square shogi" published in 2016 that is useful for teaching the shogi. It uses a 3x3 board and begins with several different start positions in which each player has between two and three pieces that may be in hand. Promotion is restricted to the last rank on each side. All other shogi rules apply. The game can be thought as a set of tsumeshogi (詰将棋 tsumeshōgi "checkmate") and brinkmate (必死 hisshi) problems.

== Bibliography ==
Aono has written a number of pedagogical materials that have been translated into English including two books and journal articles as well as numerous Japanese-only materials.

- Aono, Teruichi (1983). Guide to shogi openings: Unlock the secrets to joseki 将棋定跡のカギ: 和英 定跡問題集. Translated by Fairbairn, John. 山海堂. ISBN 4-381-00598-8.
- Aono, Teruichi (2009) [First published in 1983]. Better moves for better shogi. Translated by Fairbairn, John (2nd ed.). Ishi Press. ISBN 978-4-87187-999-6.
