= Mikoto Umezu =

Japanese shogi player (born 2007)

- Native name: 梅津 美琴
- Born: September 1, 2007 (age 18)
- Hometown: Bunkyō, Tokyo, Japan

Career
- Achieved professional status: July 1, 2022 (aged 14)
- Badge Number: W-80
- Rank: Women's 1-dan
- Teacher: Makoto Tobe (7-dan)

Websites
- JSA profile page

Mikoto Umezu (梅津 美琴, Umezu Mikoto; born September 1, 2007) is a Japanese women's professional shogi player ranked 1-dan.

== Early life and becoming a women's professional shogi player ==
Umezu was born in Bunkyō, Tokyo on September 1, 2007. She became interested in shogi from watching the anime TV series version of the manga March Comes In like a Lion. Under the guidance of shogi professional Makoto Tobe, she entered the Kantō branch of Japan Shogi Association's training group system in September 2021 as a member of training group B2, was subsequently promoted to training group B1 in December 2021, and qualified for women's professional status in April 2022 for entering the training group system at training group B2 or above and playing 48 games or more at that level.

== Women's shogi professional ==
=== Promotion history ===
Umezu's promotion history is as follows.

- 2-kyū: July 1, 2022
- 1-kyū: April 1, 2024
- 1-dan: April 1, 2025

Note: All ranks are women's professional ranks.
