= Naoki Koyama (shogi professional) =

Japanese shogi player

- Native name: 小山直希
- Born: October 7, 1999 (age 26)
- Hometown: Shinjuku, Tokyo, Japan

Career
- Achieved professional status: April 1, 2023 (aged 23)
- Badge number: 336
- Rank: 4-dan
- Teacher: Makoto Tobe (7-dan)
- Meijin class: C2
- Ryūō class: 6

Websites
- JSA profile page

Naoki Koyama (小山 直希, Koyama Naoki; October 7, 1999) is a Japanese professional shogi player ranked 4-dan.

== Early life, amateur shogi and apprentice professional ==
Koyama was born in Shinjuku, Tokyo, on October 7, 1999. Although he started playing shogi as a fourth-grade elemenatry school student on his father's recommendation, he was also very interested in soccer at that time. He started practicing both soccer and shogi, including attending a shogi school run by a former apprentice professional, but he switched his focus to shogi after being unable to play outside after injuring his shoulder playing soccer. His shogi teacher subsequently introduced him to shogi professional Makoto Tobe, and he entered the JSA's training group system in August 2010.

As a junior high school first grade student, he was accepted into the JSA's apprentice school as a student of Makoto Tobe at the rank of apprentice professional 6-kyū in February 2013. He was promoted to the rank of apprentice professional 3-dan in September 2017, and he obtained regular professional status and the rank of 4-dan in April 2023 after finishing first in the 72nd 3-dan League (October 2022 – March 2023) with a record of 13 wins and 5 losses. Koyama is the first student of Tobe to obtain regular professional status.

== Shogi professional ==
Koyama began his professional career by losing his first seven games before gaining his first official win by defeating Hiromu Watanabe on July, 20, 2023. The game was actually the second game played by the two on that day since the first game ended in sennichite: Koyama won the replay game. He then won his next scheduled game by defeating Daichi Sasaki on August 3, 2023, in a Mejin Class C2 game: the game started on August 2, lasted 159 moves and did not end until 12:27 a.m. the next day.

=== Promotion history ===
The promotion history for Koyama is as follows.

- 6-kyū: February 2013
- 3-dan: September 2017
- 4-dan: April 1, 2023
