= The Great Deceiver =

The Great Deceiver may refer to:

- Satan, an embodiment of antagonism in Abrahamic beliefs
- The Great Deceiver (band), a Swedish hardcore/metal band
- The Great Deceiver (album), a 1992 box set by King Crimson
- The Great Deceiver, an album by Mortiis
- The Great Deceiver (film), a 1953 Mexican film
- "The Great Deceiver", a song by Evergrey from Recreation Day
- "The Great Deceiver", a song by In Flames from Foregone
- "The Great Deceiver", a song by King Crimson from Starless and Bible Black

== See also ==
- Deceiver (disambiguation), includes uses of The Deceiver
