= Rook on Pawn =

Rook on Pawn
until move 15
☖ pieces in hand: –

9	8	7	6	5	4	3	2	1
香	桂	銀	金	王		銀	桂	香	1
	飛					金	角		2
歩		歩	歩	歩	歩		歩		3
						歩		歩	4
	歩								5
歩						飛			6
	歩	歩	歩	歩	歩	歩		歩	7
	角	金							8
香	桂	銀		玉	金	銀	桂	香	9

☗ pieces in hand: 歩
8. R-36
Cat's Rook on Pawn
until move 15
☖ pieces in hand: –

9	8	7	6	5	4	3	2	1
香	桂		金	王		銀	桂	香	1
	飛	銀				金	角		2
歩		歩	歩	歩	歩	歩	歩		3
								歩	4
	歩								5
歩						飛			6
	歩	歩	歩	歩	歩	歩		歩	7
	角	金							8
香	桂	銀		玉	金	銀	桂	香	9

☗ pieces in hand: 歩
8. R-36

Rook on Pawn or Vertical Pawn Picker (タテ歩取り or 縦歩取り tatefudori) is a subclass of Double Wing Attack Floating Rook (Static Rook) openings in which the Floating Rook player moves their rook to the third file aiming to capture the opponent's pawn used to open the bishop's diagonal at the 34 square.

This rook attack can occur preemptively by moving the rook before the opponent's pawn push and, thus, preventing (at least initially) the opponent from opening the bishop's diagonal. This option is known as Cat's Rook on Pawn (ネコの縦歩取り neko no tatefudori). Hosking calls this Floating Rook Cat Variation. Or, the rook can attack the pawn after it has been pushed forward and the bishop's diagonal is already open, forcing the opponent to respond to protect that pawn. This option is called Floating Rook Hanamura Variation by Hosking.

== Development to Twisting Rook ==
Rook on Pawn
until move 16
☖ pieces in hand: –

9	8	7	6	5	4	3	2	1
香	桂	銀	金	王		銀	桂	香	1
	飛						角		2
歩		歩	歩	歩	歩	金	歩		3
						歩		歩	4
	歩								5
歩						飛			6
	歩	歩	歩	歩	歩	歩		歩	7
	角	金							8
香	桂	銀		玉	金	銀	桂	香	9

☗ pieces in hand: 歩
8. ...G-33
Rook on Pawn
until move 17
☖ pieces in hand: –

9	8	7	6	5	4	3	2	1
香	桂	銀	金	王		銀	桂	香	1
	飛						角		2
歩		歩	歩	歩	歩	金	歩		3
						歩		歩	4
	歩								5
歩		歩				飛			6
	歩		歩	歩	歩	歩		歩	7
	角	金							8
香	桂	銀		玉	金	銀	桂	香	9

☗ pieces in hand: 歩
9. P-77

Rook on Pawn
until move 21
☖ pieces in hand: 歩

9	8	7	6	5	4	3	2	1
香	桂	銀	金	王		銀	桂	香	1
							角		2
歩		歩	歩	歩	歩	金	歩		3
						歩		歩	4
		歩							5
歩	飛					飛			6
			歩	歩	歩	歩		歩	7
	角	金							8
香	桂	銀		玉	金	銀	桂	香	9

☗ pieces in hand: 歩歩
11. P-75
Twisting Rook
until move 29
☖ pieces in hand: 歩

9	8	7	6	5	4	3	2	1
香	桂			王			桂	香	1
	飛	金	銀		銀		角		2
歩		歩	歩	歩	歩	金	歩		3
						歩		歩	4
		歩							5
歩	飛								6
角		桂	歩	歩	歩	歩		歩	7
		金			玉				8
香		銀			金	銀	桂	香	9

☗ pieces in hand: 歩歩
15. R-75

This type of opening often leads to the Floating Rook player also moving their rook to the left side of the board, transposing from an initial Static Rook strategy to a Ranging Rook strategy, which is usually Third File Rook. When this happens, the opening is referred to as Twisting Rook (ひねり飛車 hineribisha).

As an example of its formation, after the Rook on Pawn opening, White defends the pawn with a gold, and Black can open the bishop's diagonal leading White to exchange pawns on the eighth file. After this, Black pushes the seventh-file pawn one square further attacking White's rook causing White to retreat the rook. Black subsequently starts developing an Ishida structure and then moves the rook to the eighth file, threatening White with a rook exchange.

Note that the Rook on Pawn attack does not necessarily have to transpose to a Twisting Rook position, and that the Twisting Rook strategy may be played without first attacking the third file pawn.

== Rook on Pawn Climbing Silver ==
fig.1 Rook on Pawn Climbing Silver
until move 13
☖ pieces in hand: –

9	8	7	6	5	4	3	2	1
香	桂		金	王		銀	桂	香	1
	飛	銀				金	角		2
歩		歩	歩	歩	歩	歩	歩	歩	3
									4
	歩								5
							飛		6
歩	歩	歩	歩	歩	歩	歩		歩	7
	角	金				銀			8
香	桂	銀		玉	金		桂	香	9

☗ pieces in hand: 歩
7. S-38

fig.2 Rook on Pawn Climbing Silver
until move 15
☖ pieces in hand: –

9	8	7	6	5	4	3	2	1
香	桂		金	王		銀	桂	香	1
	飛	銀				金	角		2
歩		歩		歩	歩	歩	歩	歩	3
			歩						4
	歩								5
							飛		6
歩	歩	歩	歩	歩	歩	歩	銀	歩	7
	角	金							8
香	桂	銀		玉	金		桂	香	9

☗ pieces in hand: 歩
7. ...P-64
8. S-27

fig.3 Rook on Pawn Climbing Silver
until move 16
☖ pieces in hand: –

9	8	7	6	5	4	3	2	1
香	桂		金	王		銀	桂	香	1
	飛	銀				金	角		2
歩		歩		歩	歩		歩	歩	3
			歩			歩			4
	歩								5
							飛		6
歩	歩	歩	歩	歩	歩	歩	銀	歩	7
	角	金							8
香	桂	銀		玉	金		桂	香	9

☗ pieces in hand: 歩
8. ...P-34
fig.4 Rook on Pawn Climbing Silver
until move 17
☖ pieces in hand: –

9	8	7	6	5	4	3	2	1
香	桂		金	王		銀	桂	香	1
	飛	銀				金	角		2
歩		歩		歩	歩		歩	歩	3
			歩			歩			4
	歩								5
						飛			6
歩	歩	歩	歩	歩	歩	歩	銀	歩	7
	角	金							8
香	桂	銀		玉	金		桂	香	9

☗ pieces in hand: 歩
9. R-3f

fig.5 Rook on Pawn Climbing Silver
until move 18
☖ pieces in hand: –

9	8	7	6	5	4	3	2	1
香	桂		金	王		銀	桂	香	1
	飛	銀					角		2
歩		歩		歩	歩	金	歩	歩	3
			歩			歩			4
	歩								5
						飛			6
歩	歩	歩	歩	歩	歩	歩	銀	歩	7
	角	金							8
香	桂	銀		玉	金		桂	香	9

☗ pieces in hand: 歩
9. ...G-33
fig.6 Rook on Pawn Climbing Silver
until move 19
☖ pieces in hand: –

9	8	7	6	5	4	3	2	1
香	桂		金	王		銀	桂	香	1
	飛	銀					角		2
歩		歩		歩	歩	金	歩	歩	3
			歩			歩			4
	歩								5
						飛		銀	6
歩	歩	歩	歩	歩	歩	歩		歩	7
	角	金							8
香	桂	銀		玉	金		桂	香	9

☗ pieces in hand: 歩
10. S-16

Rook on Pawn Climbing Silver (タテ歩棒銀 tatefu bōgin or 飛尻出棒銀 hijiride bōgin) combines the Rook on Pawn technique with a Climbing Silver strategy.

== See also ==
- Twisting Rook
- Double Wing Attack Floating Rook

== Bibliography ==
- Fairbairn, John (1986). Shogi for beginners (2nd ed.). Ishi Press. ISBN 978-4-8718-720-10.
- Hanamura, Motoji [in Japanese] (1978). "Opening series: How to play the vertical rook-on-pawn opening part 1". Shogi (14). Translated by Fairbairn, John: 14–15.
- Hanamura, Motoji (1978). "Opening series: How to play the vertical rook-on-pawn opening part 2". Shogi (15). Translated by Fairbairn, John: 14–15.
- Hanamura, Motoji (1978). "Opening series: How to play the vertical rook-on-pawn opening part 3". Shogi (16). Translated by Fairbairn, John: 13–14.
- Hanamura, Motoji (1979). "Opening series: How to play the vertical rook-on-pawn opening part 4". Shogi (17). Translated by Fairbairn, John: 14–15.
- Hodges, George, ed. (1980). "An assault of rooks-on-pawn". Shogi (26): 9.
- Hosking, Tony (1997). The art of shogi. The Shogi Foundation. ISBN 978-0-95310-890-9.
- Kitao, Madoka (2011). Joseki at a glance. Translated by Kawasaki, Tomohide. Nekomado. ISBN 978-4-9052-2501-0.
