= Robert Aiello =

American author, mentalist, and public relations executive (1937–2018)

- Born: September 24, 1937; Sewickley, Pennsylvania, US
- Died: November 28, 2018 (aged 81); Pittsburgh, Pennsylvania, US
- Education: Duquesne University (BA)
- Spouse: Mary Beth Aiello
- Writing career
- Years active: 1999–2005
- Genre: Mystery
- Notable works: The Deceivers; Shadow in the Mirror; The Desperate Hours
- Website: Official website at the Wayback Machine (archived August 21, 2018)

Robert J. Aiello (September 24, 1937 – November 28, 2018) was an American author, mentalist, and public relations executive. He worked as a public relations executive at Ketchum, MacLeod & Grove, where he became associate director of its Pittsburgh branch and an executive vice president.

After retiring from Ketchum in 1986, Aiello wrote three novels: The Deceivers (1999), Shadow in the Mirror (2001), and The Desperate Hours (2005). The books are about the fictional mentalist Grant Montgomery who assists police in their investigations. Aiello performed as a mentalist at libraries and social clubs.

== Early life and career ==
Robert J. Aiello was born in Sewickley, Pennsylvania, on September 24, 1937, to James V. and Christine (née Knott) Aiello. His father taught him skeet shooting in his youth. In 1960, he received a bachelor's degree in journalism from Duquesne University. After graduation, he worked at Goodwill Industries, the Wilkinsburg Gazette, and a small public relations firm. In 1969, he joined Ketchum, MacLeod & Grove's public relations division, working as an assistant account executive. Aiello did public relations work for Heinz, PPG Industries, Rockwell International, and Westinghouse Electric Corporation. He oversaw the firm's work on Mine Safety Appliance, its Pittsburgh division's biggest customer, for 22 years. Aiello wrote press releases and promoted the Heinz Hall's opening. He in 1986 received the George Ketchum Medal, an award given for good customer service to a single employee. He became the Pittsburgh chapter president of the Public Relations Society of America. Before his retirement in 1995, he became the company's senior vice president and associate director overseeing the firm's Pittsburgh branch.

== Mentalism and writing career ==
Aiello became a member of the International Brotherhood of Magicians in around 1984. He was a mentalist who performed at libraries and social clubs. During a standard mind-reading display, Aiello would get a volunteer to concentrate on a word, phrase, or passage on a random page of a book. He proceeded to uncover what the volunteer was thinking about. Another routine was predicting what numbers viewers were thinking.

After retiring from his business career, Aiello began working on a mystery novel. He wrote three novels: The Deceivers, Shadow in the Mirror, and The Desperate Hours. The main character was Grant Montgomery, a mentalist who aids the police in their investigations. The three books take place in Pittsburgh. He sent the 246-page manuscript for his first novel to literary agents based on the East Coast and was turned down roughly 60 times. Aiello then started to send his book to tiny publishing houses. The Berkeley-based publisher Creative Arts Book Company awarded him an agreement for one book and published The Deceivers in 1999. Library Journal's Rex E. Klett penned a negative review, stating, "The basic premise of this first novel works fine, but Aiello wields a heavy hand, throws in unnecessary filler, and waffles with unwarranted explanation."

The next book in the series is Shadow in the Mirror. Regis Behe of the Pittsburgh Tribune-Review called it a "solid" book with a "compelling" plot. Karen Carlin of the Pittsburgh Post-Gazette praised Aiello for keeping the book "engrossing and moving at a fast pace". She said the book has "an interesting hero in an adequate suspense story" but wished some of the plot "had more meat".

== Personal life ==
Around 1983, Robert Aiello married Mary Beth Aiello, who was a health care group's president when he encountered her for the first time. The couple did not have children. He owned several Golden Retrievers which he assisted in coaching to be certified as therapy dogs. He visited hospitals with the dogs to offer support to the patients. Aiello wrote several op-eds and letters to the editor that were published in the Pittsburgh Post-Gazette.

After a short illness, Aiello died at UPMC Mercy on November 28, 2018, at 81 years old. At the time of his death, he was a resident of Whitehall in Allegheny County.

== Bibliography ==
- Aiello, Robert (1999). The Deceivers. Berkeley, California: Creative Arts Book Company. ISBN 978-0-88739-187-3.
- Aiello, Robert (2001). Shadow in the Mirror. Berkeley, California: Creative Arts Book Company. ISBN 978-0-88739-345-7 – via Internet Archive.
- Aiello, Robert (2005). The Desperate Hours. Tucson, Arizona: Hats Off Books. ISBN 978-1-58736-448-8 – via Internet Archive.
