= Wataru Yashiro =

Japanese shogi player

- Native name: 八代 弥
- Born: March 3, 1994 (age 31)
- Hometown: Kamo District, Shizuoka

Career
- Achieved professional status: April 1, 2012 (aged 18)
- Badge Number: 287
- Rank: 8-dan
- Teacher: Teruichi Aono (9-dan)
- Tournaments won: 1
- Meijin class: C2
- Ryūō class: 1

Websites
- JSA profile page

Wataru Yashiro (八代 弥, Yashiro Wataru; born March 3, 1994) is a Japanese professional shogi player ranked 8-dan.

== Early life and apprenticeship ==
Yashiro was born on March 3, 1994, in Kamo District, Shizuoka. He learned how to play shogi from his father when he was a first-grade elementary school student, and was accepted into the Japan Shogi Association's apprentice school at the rank of 6-kyū in September 2005 under the guidance of shogi professional Teruichi Aono.

At first, Yashiro had some difficulty as an apprentice professional and even came close to being demoted in rank to 7-kyū; however, he started practicing regularly at the Kamata Shogi Club—a well-known shogi club where many strong amateurs, apprentence professionals, and even regular professionals would practice—and his results began to quickly improve. He was promoted to the rank of 1-dan in 2008, and then 3-dan in April 2010. He obtained full professional status and the rank of 4-dan in March 2012 after finishing runner up in the 50th 3-dan League (October 2011 – March 2012) with a record of 14 wins and 4 losses.

== Shogi professional ==
Yashiro defeated Yasuaki Murayama to win the 10th Asahi Cup Open in February 2017 for his only shogi tournament championship to date. Yashiro was just twenty-two years old at the time which made him the then youngest player to ever have won the tournament. Yashiro's record, however, was broken the following year by Sōta Fujii who won the 11th Asahi Cup Open as a fifteen-year-old.

=== Promotion history ===
The promotion history for Yashiro is as follows:

- 6-kyū: September 2005
- 3-dan: April 2010
- 4-dan: April 1, 2012
- 5-dan: May 12, 2015
- 6-dan: February 11, 2017
- 7-dan: April 23, 2019
- 8-dan: July 10, 2025

=== Titles and other championships ===
Yashiro has yet to make an appearance in a major title match, but he has won one non-major shogi championships during his career.

=== Awards and honors ===
Yashiro received the Japan Shogi Association Annual Shogi Award for "Best New Player" for the 2016–2017 Shogi Year.
