= Akira Nishio =

Japanese shogi player

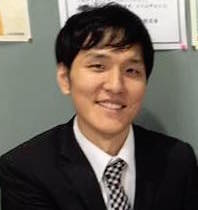
- Native name: 西尾明
- Born: September 30, 1979 (age 47)
- Hometown: Yokohama

Career
- Achieved professional status: April 1, 2003 (aged 23)
- Badge number: 248
- Rank: 7-dan
- Teacher: Teruichi Aono (9-dan)
- Meijin class: C1
- Ryūō class: 4

Websites
- JSA profile page

Akira Nishio (西尾 明, Nishio Akira; born September 30, 1979) is a Japanese professional shogi player ranked 7-dan. He is a former executive director of the Japan Shogi Association.

Nishio introduces shogi theory in the English language through his blog Shogi Openings and his occasional posts on Facebook.

== Early life ==
Nishio was born in Yokohama, Kanagawa Prefecture on September 30, 1979. He finished runner up in the Elementary School Student Meijin Tournament in 1988 as a third-grade elementary school student, and made the semi-finals of the same tournament two years later.

In September 1990, Nishio entered the Japan Shogi Association's apprentice school at the rank of 6-kyū under the guidance of shogi professional Teruichi Aono. He was promoted to the rank of 1-dan in 1995, and obtained full professional status and the rank of 4-dan in April 2003 after finishing runner up in the 32nd 3-dan League with a record of 11 wins and 7 losses.

== Shogi professional ==
=== Promotion history ===
Nishio's promotion history is as follows:

- 6-kyū: September 1990
- 1-dan: 1995
- 4-dan: April 1, 2003
- 5-dan: September 18, 2007
- 6-dan: April 21, 2011
- 7-dan: February 13, 2019

== JSA director ==
Nishio was elected to the Japan Shogi Association's board of directors for a two-year term as an executive director in June 2019. He was re-elected to additional two-year terms in June 2021 and June 2023.

== Bibliography ==
- 西尾 [Nishio], 明 [Akira]. 2011. よくわかる角換わり. 毎日コミュニケーションズ. ISBN 4-8399-3985-3
- 西尾, 明. 2015. 矢倉☖5三銀右戦法: 仕掛けて勝つ後手矢倉の革命. マイナビ出版. ISBN 978-4839957360
- 西尾, 明. 2017. 矢倉の基本: 駒組みと考え方. マイナビ出版. ISBN 978-4839961718
- 西尾, 明; 大平 [Ōhira], 武洋 [Takehiro]; & 村中 [Muranaka], 秀史 [Shūji]. 2008. 新鋭居飛車実戦集. 毎日コミュニケーションズ. ISBN 4-8399-2860-6
