= Makoto Tobe =

Japanese professional shogi player

- Native name: 戸辺誠
- Born: August 5, 1986 (age 39)
- Hometown: Yokohama

Career
- Achieved professional status: October 1, 2006 (aged 20)
- Badge number: 262
- Rank: 7-dan
- Teacher: Jun'ichi Kase (7-dan)
- Meijin class: B2
- Ryūō class: 4
- Notable students: Naoki Koyama; Mikoto Umezu; Saki Miyazawa

Websites
- JSA profile page
- Official website

Makoto Tobe (戸辺 誠, Tobe Makoto; born August 5, 1986) is a Japanese professional shogi player ranked 7-dan.

== Early life and apprenticeship ==
Makoto Tobe was born on August 5, 1986, in Yokohama. He entered the Japan Shogi Association's apprentice school as a student of shogi professional Jun'ichi Kase in October 1998 at the rank of 6-kyū. He was promoted to 1-dan in August 2001, and then obtained full professional status and the rank of 4-dan in October 2006 after winning the 39th 3-dan League (April 2006 – September 2006) with a record of 15 wins and 3 losses.

== Shogi professional ==
=== Promotion history ===
The promotion history for Tobe is as follows:

- 6-kyū: September 1998
- 4-dan: October 1, 2006
- 5-dan: March 10, 2009
- 6-dan: February 9, 2010
- 7-dan: June 1, 2016

=== Awards and honors ===
Tobe received the Japan Shogi Association Annual Shogi Awards for "Best New Player" in 2009 and "Best Winning Percentage" (2007 and 2013).
