= Fusako Ajiki =

Japanese shogi player

- Native name: 安食総子
- Born: May 2, 1974 (age 51)
- Hometown: Musashino, Tokyo

Career
- Achieved professional status: April 1, 1998 (aged 23)
- Badge Number: W-22
- Rank: Women's 2-dan
- Retired: July 11, 2022 (aged 48)
- Teacher: Teruichi Aono (9-dan)

Websites
- JSA profile page

Fusako Ajiki (安食 総子, Ajiki Fusako; born May 2, 1974) is a Japanese retired women's professional shogi player who achieved the rank of 2-dan.

== Women's professional shogi ==
On April 1, 2022, the Japan Shogi Association announced that Ajiki had met the criteria for mandatory retirement but that the effective date of her retirement had yet to be determined. On July 11, 2022, Ajiki lost to Ayaka Ōshima in the last round of Class D section of the Hakurei Tournament. The JSA announced the following day that her retirement became official after this loss.

=== Promotion history ===
Ajiki's promotion history was as follows:

- 2-kyū: April 1, 1998
- 1-kyū: April 1, 2002
- 1-dan: April 1, 2003
- Retired: July 11, 2022
- 2-dan: April 1, 2023

Note: All ranks are women's professional ranks.
