= Hideyuki Takano =

Japanese shogi player

- Native name: 高野秀行
- Born: June 15, 1972 (age 53)
- Hometown: Yokohama

Career
- Achieved professional status: April 1, 1998 (aged 25)
- Badge Number: 226
- Rank: 7-dan
- Teacher: Makoto Nakahara (9-dan)
- Meijin class: C2
- Ryūō class: 6

Websites
- JSA profile page

Hideyuki Takano (髙野 秀行, Takano Hideyuki; June 15, 1972) is a Japanese professional shogi player ranked 7-dan.

== Early life and apprenticeship ==
Takano was born in Yokohama, Kanagawa Prefecture on June 15, 1972. He entered the Japan Shogi Association's apprentice school in December 1984 at the rank 6-kyū under the tutelage of shogi professional Makoto Nakahara. He was promoted to 1-dan in March 1991 and was awarded full professional status and the rank of 4-dan in April 1998 after winning the 22nd 3-dan League (October 1997 – March 1998) with a record of 13 wins and 5 losses.

== Shogi professional ==
=== Promotion history ===
Takano's promotion history is as follows:

- 6-kyū: 1984
- 1-dan: 1991
- 4-dan: April 1, 1998
- 5-dan: October 21, 2003
- 6-dan: February 22, 2011
- 7-dan: October 3, 2024
