= Makoto Nakahara =

Japanese shogi player

- Born: September 2, 1947 (age 77)
- Hometown: Shiogama
- Nationality: Japanese

Career
- Achieved professional status: October 1, 1965 (aged 18)
- Badge Number: 92
- Rank: 9-dan
- Retired: March 31, 2009 (aged 61)
- Teacher: Toshio Takayanagi (Honorary 9-dan)
- Lifetime titles: Lifetime Meijin; Lifetime Tenth Dan; Lifetime Ōi; Lifetime Ōza; Lifetime Kisei
- Major titles won: 64
- Tournaments won: 28
- Career record: 1308–782 (.626)
- Notable students: Hisashi Ogura; Shūji Satō; Hideyuki Takano; Manabu Kumasaka; Tomomi Kai

Websites
- JSA profile page

Makoto Nakahara (中原 誠, Nakahara Makoto; born September 2, 1947) is a Japanese retired professional shogi player who achieved the rank of 9-dan. He was one of the strongest shogi players of the Shōwa period (1926–1989) and holds the titles of Lifetime Kisei, Lifetime Meijin, Lifetime 10-dan, Lifetime Ōi, and Lifetime Ōza.

== Shogi professional ==
Nakahara retired from professional shogi in March 2009 at age 61 for health reasons.

== Theoretical contributions ==
Nakahara won the Kōzō Masuda Award in 1996 for developing the "Nakahara castle" (中原囲い (Nakahara Gakoi)) as a counter strategy to the Side Pawn Capture opening.

☖ pieces in hand: –

9	8	7	6	5	4	3	2	1
									1
									2
									3
									4
									5
		歩							6
歩	歩		歩	歩	歩				7
		金			銀				8
香	桂	銀	玉	金					9

☗ pieces in hand: –
The "Nakahara castle" is a type of castling strategy often used in Side Pawn Capture games to defend against rook drops.

=== Major titles and other championships ===
Nakahara appeared in 91 major title matches and won 64 major titles during his career. He won the Kisei title sixteen times, the Meijin title fifteen times, the 10-dan title eleven times, the Ōi title eight times, the Osho title seven times, Oza title six times, and the Kioh title once. He holds the titles of Lifetime Kisei, Lifetime Meijin, Lifetime 10-dan, Lifetime Ōi, and Lifetime Ōza.

In addition to major titles, Nakahara won 28 other shogi championships throughout his career.

==== Major titles ====
Title	Years	Number of times overall
Meijin	1972–81, 1985–87, 1990–92	15
Kisei	1968–1969, 1970–1972, 1977–1979, 1988-1989 (Note: The Kisei title was held twice yearly up until 1994. Nakahara won the title three times from 1968 to 1969, four times from 1970 to 1972, five times from 1977 to 1979 and three times from 1988 to 1989.)	16
*10-dan title (Note: The 10-dan title was replaced by the Ryūō title in 1988.)	1971–73, 1975–80, 1983–84	11
Ōi	1973–78, 1980–81	8
Osho	1972–1977, 1984	7
Ōza	1983–86, 1988–89	6
Kiō	1979	1

- Note: Tournaments marked with an asterisk (*) are no longer held.

== JSA president ==
Nakahara served as the president of the Japan Shogi Association from May 2003 until May 2005.
