= The Deceivers (Aiello novel) =

Novel by Robert Aiello

- Author: Robert Aiello
- Language: English
- Publisher: Creative Arts Book Company
- Publication date: 1999
- Publication place: United States
- Media type: Print (paperback)
- Pages: 239
- ISBN: 0-88739-187-7
- OCLC: 42685108

The Deceivers is a crime novel by the American writer Robert Aiello set in Pittsburgh, Pennsylvania. It tells the story of Grant Montgomery, a retired mentalist who helps police solve the murder of a psychic scam artist. When he uncovers a national crime network, a ruthless public official targets him.
