= 81Dojo =

81Dojo (Japanese: hachi-jū-ichi dōjō, hachi-jū-ichi or hachi-ichi) is a non-profit internet shogi server and internet forum. While the site is based in Japan, there is an additional English language version of the website, making it possible to play against non-Japanese players. All features are available for free.

The site has been sponsored by the Japan Shogi Association since 2013.

Anyone can play anonymously, although players may register an account on the site to play rated games. As of 11 January 2020, the number of registered users was around 100,000. There are players in 90 different countries, though most are from Japan.

Alongside efforts to popularize the game outside of Japan, the site also offers traditional post-game analysis features. Some of the most popular features include sharing of the board after a match, the ability to rewind the game to identify and make changes, and illustration of the best strategic moves on the board.

81Dojo has associated official smart phone apps for Apple and Android operating systems.

== History ==
81Dojo originally started as an online shogi forum named 81-Square Universe by two American shogi fans in an effort to internationalize shogi to fans in the United States and their efforts was eventually noticed by Tomohide Kawasaki after they analyzed one of his games. Kawasaki was a Japanese engineer working for Toyota who was also YouTuber using the pseudonym Hidetchi who was known for his shogi videos and other online shogi promotion efforts. Kawasaki created 81Dojo in 2012.
