= Madoka Kitao =

Japanese shogi player (born 1980)

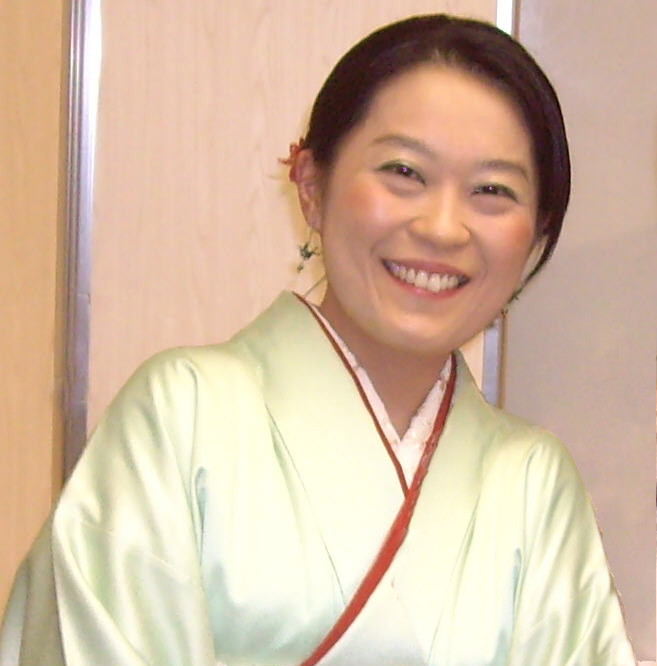
- Native name: 北尾まどか
- Born: January 21, 1980 (age 46)
- Hometown: Tokyo

Career
- Achieved professional status: October 1, 2000 (aged 20)
- Badge number: W-43
- Rank: Women's 3-dan
- Retired: July 10, 2023 (aged 43)
- Teacher: Kazuyoshi Nishimura (9-dan)
- Career record: 110–187 (.370)

Websites
- JSA profile page
- Madoka Kitao on X

Madoka Kitao (北尾 まどか, Kitao Madoka; born January 21, 1980) is a Japanese retired women's professional shogi player who achieved the rank of women's professional 3-dan. (Note: Kitao was ranked 2-dan at the time of her retirement in July 2023 but was promoted to 3-dan by the JSA in April 2026.)

== Women's shogi professional ==
=== Promotion history ===
Kitao has been promoted as follows:

- 2-kyū: October 1, 2000
- 1-kyū: April 1, 2001
- 1-dan: April 1, 2003
- 2-dan: August 1, 2013
- Retired: July 10, 2023
- 3-dan: April 1, 2026

Note: All ranks are women's professional ranks.

=== Retirement ===
On April 3, 2023, the Japan Shogi Association (JSA) posted on its official website that Kitao had met the criteria for mandatory retirement for women's professionals, but that her retirement would not take effect until the completion of her last official game. On July 11, 2023, the JSA posted that Kitao's retirement became official on July 10, 2023, upon the completion of her game against Saori Shimai. Kitao finished her career with a record of 110 wins and 187 losses for a winning percentage of 37%.

== Shogi-related business and promotion activities ==
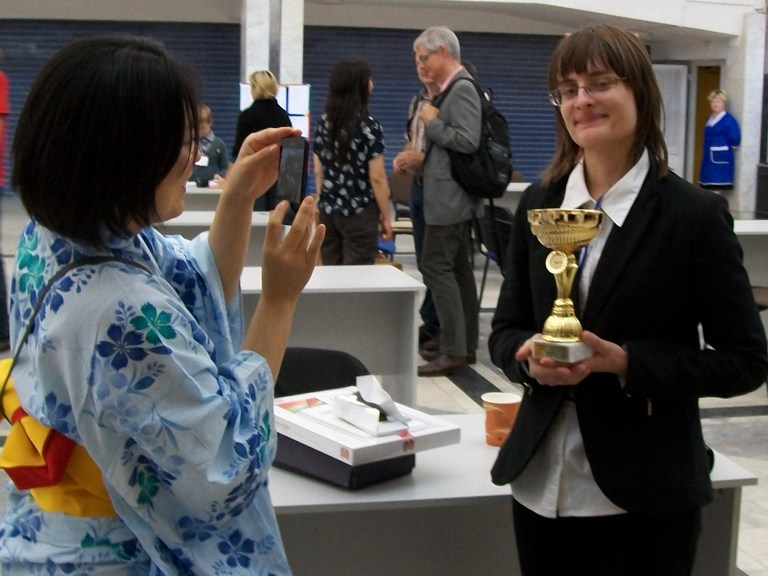
Karolina Styczyńska with Kitao in 2013

Kitao, together with former women's professional Maiko Fujita created the game dōbutsu shogi, a simplified version of shogi designed to help beginners learn the game, in 2008: Kitao came up with the rules of the game, while Fujita designed the game's pieces. She is also the representative director and founder of Nekomado (株式会社ねこまど), a shogi promotion, education and publishing company.

Kitao is also credited with discovering Karolina Styczyńska while playing online shogi on the website 81Dojo as part of her efforts at promoting shogi outside of Japan among non-Japanese players. Kitao was quite impressed with the strength of Styczyńska's play, eventually found out who she was and then made arrangements for her to come and practice shogi in Japan. Styczyńska, through Kitao's further encouragement and support, eventually went on to become the first non-Japanese to be awarded any type of professional status by the Japan Shogi Association.

== Personal life ==
In February 2006, the JSA announced on its official website the engagement of Kitao to shogi professional Daisuke Katagami.

On June 12, 2016, Katagami posted on his personal blog that he had gotten divorced some time ago, and that he had gotten married again to someone else about two months earlier. The following day, Kitao tweeted that she and Katagami had gotten divorced about two years earlier in response; her tweet included a link to Katagami's blog post.
