= Yuria Katō =

Japanese shogi player (born 2003)

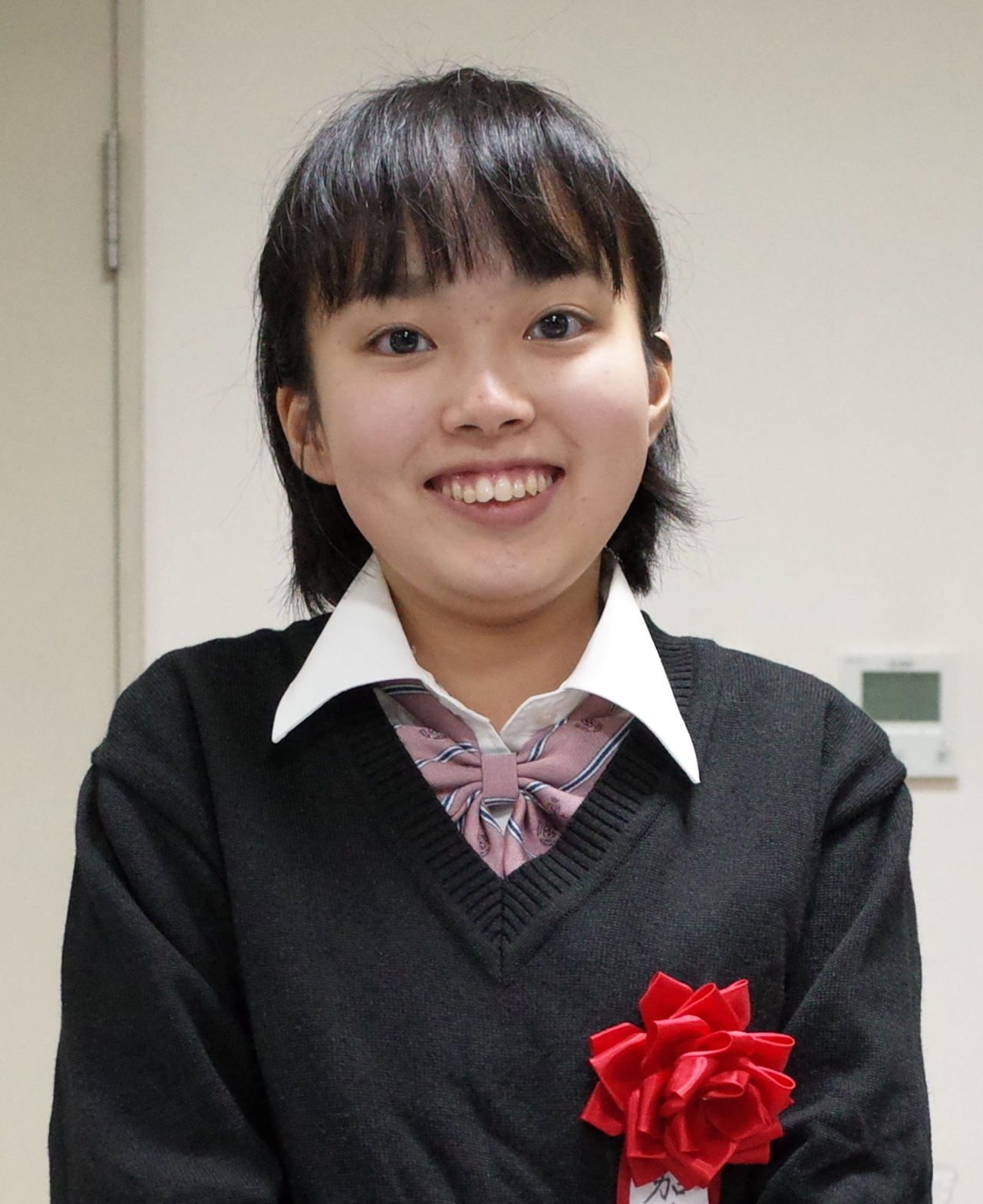
- Katō at a shogi festival in October 2019.
- Native name: 加藤結李愛
- Born: February 15, 2003 (age 23)
- Hometown: Sendai, Miyagi Prefecture

Career
- Achieved professional status: July 7, 2018 (aged 15)
- Badge number: W-65
- Rank: Women's 2-dan
- Teacher: Kazuo Ishida (9-dan)
- Tournaments won: 1

Websites
- JSA profile page

Yuria Katō (加藤 結李愛, Katō Yuria; born February 15, 2003 in Sendai, Miyagi Prefecture) is a Japanese women's professional shogi player ranked 2-dan.

== Early life and becoming a women's shogi professional ==
Katō was born on February 15, 2003, in Sendai, Miyagi Prefecture. She learned how to play shogi from her older brother when she was a second-grade elementary school student. She started playing shogi at a local shogi club in Sendai and continued to improve saying she "enjoyed playing against older people because her age didn't matter" and that it was "fun trying to figure out how each game would develop". She first thought about actually trying to become a women's professional shogi player after meeting shogi professional Akira Shima and women's shogi professional Kanna Suzuki at an shogi event for local children as part of the JSA's efforts to help those in Tōhoku region recover from the 2011 Tōhoku earthquake and tsunami.

In April 2016, she was accepted into Class D1 of the Japan Shogi Association (JSA) training group system, and she finished tied for third in the 48th Women's Amateur Meijin Tournament later that same year in October.

Katō was promoted to Class C1 of the training group system in September 2017 after winning six games in a row, which meant she met the criteria for becoming a provisional women's professional shogi player ranked 3-kyū, and officially became a provisional women's professional, under the guidance of shogi professional Kazuo Ishida, on April 1, 2018. In July 2018, she advanced to the main tournament draw of the 12th Mynavi Open, which meant that she qualified for promotion to the rank of women's professional 2-kyū and full women's professional status.

== Women's shogi professional ==
Katō advanced to the finals of the 27th Kurashiki Tōka Cup challenger tournament in September 2019, but lost to Sae Ito.

Katō defeated Ayano Hori to win the 7th Women's Professional Yamada Challenge Cup in January 2023 for her first shogi tournament championship.

=== Promotion history ===
Katō's promotion history is as follows:

- 3-kyū: April 1, 2018
- 2-kyū: July 7, 2018
- 1-kyū: June 13, 2019
- 1-dan: August 25, 2019
- 2-dan: July 13, 2024

Note: All ranks are women's professional ranks.

== Personal life ==
Katō is suffers from a congenital muscular disease and finds it difficult to sit in the seiza position required for some official games. As a result, the JSA announced in September 2019 that she can play all of her games seated in a chair at a table.
