= Iwasa =

Iwasa (written: 岩佐, 岩浅 and 岩朝) is a Japanese surname. Notable people with the surname include:

- Ayumu Iwasa (岩佐 歩夢, born 2001), Japanese racing driver
- Iwasa Matabei (岩佐 又兵衛, 1578–1650), Japanese artist
- Janet Iwasa, American cell biologist and animator
- Mayuko Iwasa (岩佐 真悠子, born 1987), Japanese gravure idol
- Mihoko Iwasa (岩佐 美帆子, born 2005), Japanese shogi player
- Misaki Iwasa (岩佐 美咲, born 1995), Japanese idol and singer
- Ryosuke Iwasa (岩佐 亮佑, born 1989), Japanese boxer
- Sakutarō Iwasa (岩佐 作太郎, 1879–1967), Japanese anarchist
- Shun Iwasa (岩佐 俊, 1888–1969), Japanese general
- Taku Iwasa (岩佐 拓, born 1977), Japanese professional wrestler
- Yoh Iwasa (巌佐 庸, born 1952), Japanese academic
