= Kadokura =

Kadokura (written: 門倉) is a Japanese surname. Notable people with the surname include:

- Keita Kadokura (門倉 啓太, born 1987), Japanese shogi player
- Ken Kadokura (門倉 健, born 1973), Japanese baseball player
- Satoshi Kadokura (門倉 聡, born 1959), Japanese composer
