= Hiura =

Hiura (written: 日浦 or 樋浦) is a Japanese surname. Notable people with the surname include:

- Ben Hiura (樋浦 勉, born 1943), Japanese actor and voice actor
- Ichirō Hiura (日浦 市郎, born 1966), Japanese shogi player
- Keston Hiura (born 1996), American baseball player
