= Sayuri Honda =

Japanese shogi player (born 1978)

- Native name: 本田小百合
- Born: October 3, 1978 (age 46)
- Hometown: Mito, Ibaraki

Career
- Achieved professional status: April 1, 1992 (aged 13)
- Badge Number: W-14
- Rank: Women's 4-dan
- Teacher: Yūji Sase (9-dan)

Websites
- JSA profile page

Sayuri Honda (本田 小百合, Honda Sayuri; born October 3, 1978) is a Japanese women's professional shogi player ranked 4-dan.

== Women's shogi professional ==
=== Promotion history ===
Honda's promotion history is as follows.

- 2-kyū: April 1, 1992
- 1-kyū: April 1, 1993
- 1-dan: April 1, 1999
- 2-dan: May 19, 2004
- 3-dan: September 26, 2012
- 4-dan: May 10, 2025

Note: All ranks are women's professional ranks.

=== Titles and other championships ===
Honda's only appearance in a women's major title match came in when she unsuccessfully challenged Momoko Katō for the 2nd Women's Ōza title in 2012.
