= Sadamasu =

Sadamasu may refer to:

- Sadamasu, the previous name of Kunimasu Utagawa (fl. 1830s - 1850s), designer of ukiyo-e woodblock prints
- Minami Sadamasu, professional shogi player
