= Yui Isoya =

Japanese Shogi player (born 2003)

- Native name: 磯谷祐維
- Born: January 15, 2003 (age 23)
- Hometown: Kakamigahara, Gifu Prefecture, Japan

Career
- Achieved professional status: September 1, 2023 (aged 20)
- Badge number: LPSA-23
- Rank: Women's 2-dan
- Teacher: Takayuki Yamasaki (9)

Websites
- LPSA profile page

Yui Isoya (磯谷 祐維, Isoya Yui; born January 15, 2003) is a Japanese women's professional shogi player ranked 2-dan. She is affiliated with the Ladies Professional Shogi-players' Association of Japan (LSPA).

== Early life, amateur shogi, and apprentice professional school ==
Isoya was born on January 15, 2003, in Kakamigahara, Gifu Prefecture, Japan. She started playing shogi as a third-grade elementary school student under the guidance of her father and grandfather. She began attending a local shogi school to improve her play and subsequently enrolled the Japan Shogi Association's training group for the Tōkai region in April 2012 as a member of Group F2. By the time she had become a second-grade junior high school student in April 2016, she had been promoted to Group C1, which meant she had met the then qualification for women's professional status; she decided, however, that was not the path she wanted to pursue and did not to apply. She continued in the training group system and was promoted to Group B2 in July 2016; she still had the option of becoming women's shogi professional but still decided not to do so. In 2017, she took the entrance exam for the JSA's apprentice professional school and was accepted as a student of shogi professional Takayuki Yamasaki at the rank of 6-kyū; she had to leave the school after only 11 months, however, due to poor results after being demoted to the rank of 7-kyū.

After leaving the apprentice professional school, Isoya continued developing as a player by playing in amateur shogi tournaments. In February 2023, she re-entered JSA's training group system for the Kanto Region where she was living after enrolling in Kokushikan University in 2021. She satisfied one of conditions for promotion to the rank of women's professional 2-kyū when she was promoted to from training group C1 to training group B2 in April 2023, but still had not played enough games since re-entering the training group system to earn promotion at that time. In August 2023, she finally had played enough games and had avoided demotion from group B2, and this gave her the option to become a women's professional 2-kyū if she wanted to do so. She decided become a women's professional as a member of the Ladies Professional Shogi-players' Association of Japan and was officially awarded the rank of women's professional 2-kyū on September 1, 2023.

=== Notable amateur results ===
In August 2015, Isoya won the 7th Girl's Junior High School Meijin Tournament (中学生女子将棋名人戦全国大会, Chūgakusei Joshi Shōgi Meijinsen Zenkoku Taikai) as a first-grade junior high school student. As a third-grade junior high school student in August 2019, she also won the Girl's Division of the 38th All Japan Junior High School Student Invitational Shogi Championship (全国中学生選抜将棋選手権大会, Zenkoku Chūgakusei Senbatsu Shōgi Senshuken Taikai).

In December 2018, Isoya won the 11th Girl's Amateur Ōi Tournament (女子アマ王位戦, Joshi Ama Ōisen) when she was a first-year high school student. The following December she won the tournament again to repeat as champion and then won the tournament for a third time in December 2022 when she was a second-year university student.

Isoya won the Women's Amateur Meijin Tournament (女流アマ名人戦, Joryū Ama Meijinsen) in September 2021, and repeated the feat the following year to become the tenth woman to win the tournament in consecutive years.

== Women's shogi professional ==
Isoya won her first tournament since becoming women's professional when she defeated Miran Nohara in the finals of the non-major title 8th Yamada Challenge Cup (July 2023 – January 2024). Isoya began the tournament while still an amateur; she won her first two games played on July 24 and became a women's professional 2-kyū between Rounds 2 and 3 on September 1, 2023. She was promoted to women's professional 1-kyu after winning her semi-final game against Rei Takedomi on November 17, 2023, and then to women's professional 1-dan after being Nohara in the final on January 3, 2024.

In March 2026, Isoya advanced to the finals of the challenger determination tournament for the 37th Women's Ōi but lost to Ayaka Ōshima in 112 moves to miss becoming the challenger for a women's professional shogi major title. Two months later in May, Isoya had another chance to become the challenger for a women's major title but lost to Tomoka Nishiyama in 113 moves in the finals of the challenger determination tournament for the 8th Seirei tournament.

=== Promotion history ===
Isoya has been promoted as follows.

- 2-kyū: September 1, 2023
- 1-kyū: November 17, 2023
- 1-dan: January 3, 2024
- 2-dan: June 29, 2026

Note: All ranks are women's professional ranks.

== Personal life ==
Isoya was accepted into Kokushikan University in 2021 as a student of the School of Science and Engineering, but posted on her official X account on April 2, 2024, that she left the university on March 31, 2024, to focus shogi.
