= Mirei Kamada =

Japanese shogi player (born 2008)

- Native name: 鎌田 美礼
- Born: June 24, 2008 (age 16)
- Hometown: Toride, Ibaraki, Japan

Career
- Achieved professional status: May 1, 2022 (aged 13)
- Badge Number: W-78
- Rank: Women's 2-kyū
- Teacher: Kazuo Ishida (9-dan)

Websites
- JSA profile page

Mirei Kamada (鎌田 美礼, Kamada Mirei; born June 24, 2008) is a Japanese women's professional shogi player ranked 2-kyū.

== Early life and becoming a women's professional shogi player ==
Kamada was born in Toride, Ibaraki on June 24, 2008. She learned how to play shogi from her father when she was six years old, subsequently began attending a local shogi school operated by shogi professional Kazuo Ishida as a third-grade elementary school student. Under Ishida's guidance, she entered the Tōkai branch of the Japan Shogi Association's training group system as a fourth-grade elementary school student, and qualified for women's professional status as a second-grade junior high school student after being promoted to training group B2 in April 2022.

== Promotion history ==
Kamada's promotion history is as follows.

- 2-kyū: May 1, 2022

Note: All ranks are women's professional ranks.
