= Yūichi Tanaka =

Japanese professional shogi player

- Native name: 田中悠一
- Born: March 14, 1985 (age 40)
- Hometown: Nagano, Nagano, Japan

Career
- Achieved professional status: April 1, 2008 (aged 23)
- Badge Number: 270
- Rank: 6-dan
- Teacher: Shigeru Sekine (9-dan)
- Meijin class: C2
- Ryūō class: 6

Websites
- JSA profile page

Yūichi Tanaka (田中 悠一, Tanaka Yūichi; born March 14, 1985) is a Japanese professional shogi player ranked 6-dan.

== Early life ==
Tanaka was born in Nagano, Nagano on March 14, 1985. He became interested in shogi as a fourth-grade elementary school student after watching some friends play and asked his father to teach him the rules. Shortly thereafter, he started frequenting a local shogi club to improve his skill.

== Amateur shogi and apprenticeship ==
As a first-grade junior high school student in 1997, Tanaka finished third in the 18th All-Japan Junior High School Student Invitational Shogi Tournament. In September of the following year, he entered the Japan Shogi Association's apprentice school as a student of shogi professional Shigeru Sekine at the rank of 6-kyū. He obtained full professional status and the rank of 4-dan in April 2008 after finishing tied with Akira Inaba in the 42nd 3-dan League (October 2007 – March 2008) with a record of 13 wins and 5 losses.

== Shogi professional ==
=== Promotion history ===
The promotion history for Tanaka is as follows:

- 6-kyū: September 1998
- 4-dan: April 1, 2008
- 5-dan: October 23, 2014
- 6-dan: October 12, 2023

== Personal life ==
Tanaka graduated from the Science Department of Rikkyo University with a degree in mathematics in 2007.
