= Minami Sadamasu =

Japanese shogi player (born 1986)

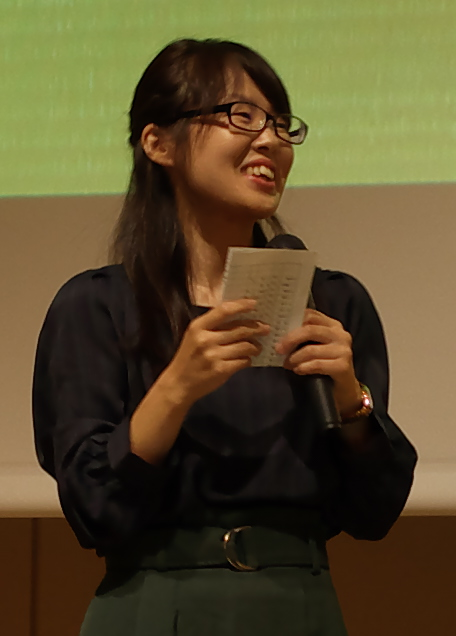
- Sadamasu in 2018
- Native name: 貞升南
- Born: April 19, 1986 (age 39)
- Hometown: Fuchū, Tokyo

Career
- Achieved professional status: October 1, 2003 (aged 17)
- Badge Number: W-31
- Rank: Women's 2-dan
- Teacher: Kōji Horiguchi (7-dan)

Websites
- JSA profile page

Minami Sadamasu (貞升 南, Sadamasu Minami; born April 19, 1986) is a Japanese women's professional shogi player ranked 2-dan.

== Women's shogi professional ==
Sadamasu advanced to the finals of the 2nd Yamada Women's Professional Challenge Cup in August 2016, but lost to Mana Watanabe.

=== Promotion history ===
Sadamasu's promotion history is as follows:

- 2-kyū: October 1, 2003
- 1-kyū: April 1, 2007
- 1-dan: April 1, 2013
- 2-dan: January 19, 2021

Note: All ranks are women's professional ranks.
