= Ai Iino =

Japanese shogi player (born 1986)

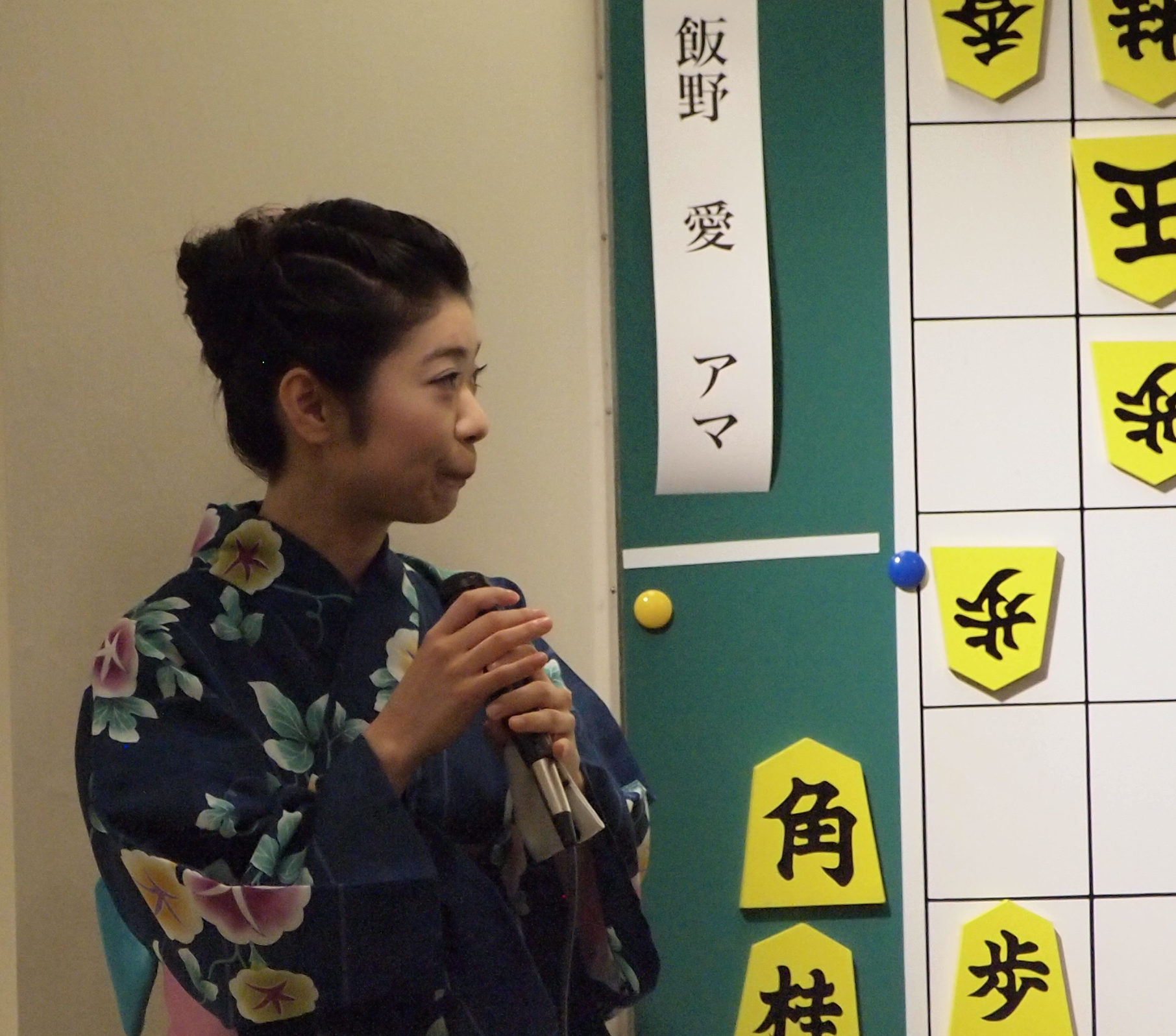
- Iino in 2013
- Native name: 飯野愛
- Born: November 17, 1986 (age 39)
- Hometown: Setagaya, Tokyo

Career
- Achieved professional status: October 1, 2013 (aged 26)
- Badge number: W-48
- Rank: Women's 1-dan
- Teacher: Kenji Iino (7-dan)

Websites
- JSA profile page

Ai Iino (飯野 愛, Iino Ai; born November 17, 1986) is a Japanese women's professional shogi player ranked 1-dan.

== Early life and apprenticeship ==
Iino was born on November 17, 1986, in Setagaya, Tokyo. Since her father Kenji was a shogi professional, she was first exposed to the game at a very young age and grew up in a shogi environment. Even so, she only really decided to pursue a career as a women's professional shogi player when she was second-year senior high school student.

In the Fall of 2005, Iino entered the Women's Apprentice Professional League under the guidance of her father, but was moved to Training Group Class D2 in April 2009 after the JSA ended the Women's Apprentice Professional League system at the end of March 2009. Iino was promoted to Training Group Class C1 in June 2013. This earned her the right to request to be promoted to the women's provisional shogi player status and the rank of 3-kyū. Iino submitted her request to the JSA, which announced a little over week later that it had been approved and that and she was to be officially awarded the rank and provisional women's professional status on October 1, 2013. In August 2013, however, Iino—who was still considered an amateur—won her preliminary group of the 7th MyNavi Women's Open Tournament. Her result meant that she not only advanced to the main tournament, but also that she satisfied the criteria for promotion to the rank of women's professional 1-kyū. The JSA announced a few days later on August 19, 2013, that Iino would be officially awarded the rank of women's professional 2-kyū and regular women's professional status on October 1, 2013.

== Women's shogi professional ==
=== Promotion history ===
Iino's promotion history is as follows:

- 2-kyū: October 1, 2013
- 1-kyū: May 9, 2014
- 1-dan: April 1, 2018

Note: All ranks are women's professional ranks.

== Personal life ==
Iino's father Kenji is a retired shogi professional.
