= Yūki Hasegawa =

Japanese Shogi player (born 1995)

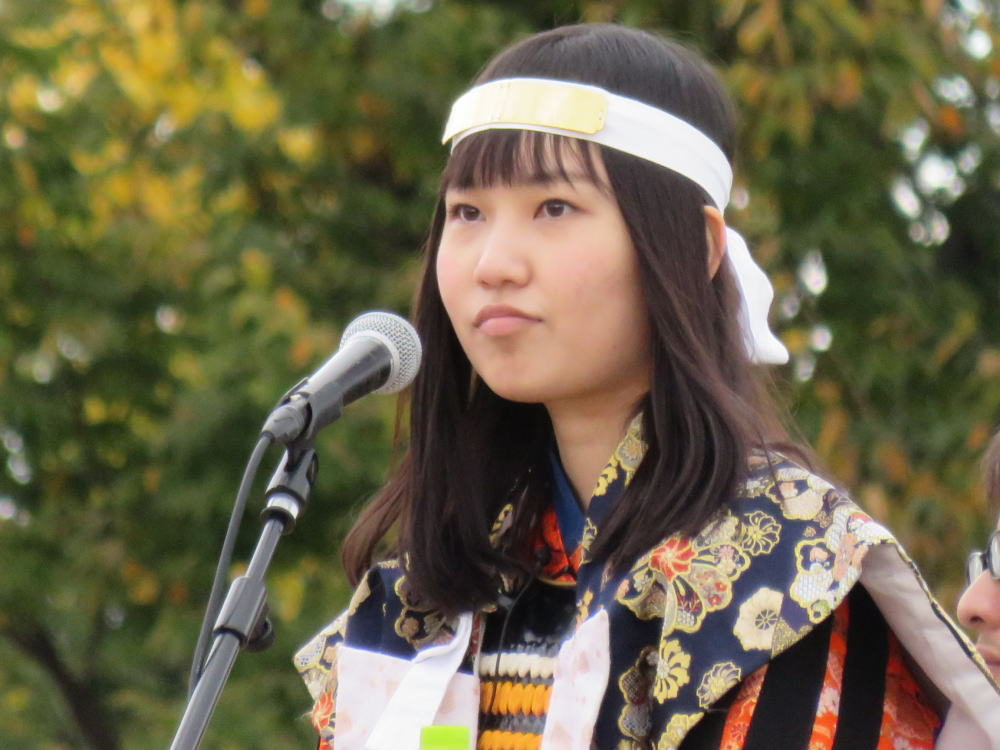
- Hasegawa at a 2018 Human Shogi event
- Native name: 長谷川優貴
- Born: September 13, 1995 (age 29)
- Hometown: Hyōgo Prefecture, Japan

Career
- Achieved professional status: October 1, 2011 (aged 16)
- Badge Number: W-44
- Rank: Women's 3-dan
- Teacher: Keizō Noda (6-dan)

Websites
- JSA profile page

Yūki Hasegawa (長谷川 優貴, Hasegawa Yūki; born September 13, 1995) is a Japanese women's professional shogi player ranked 3-dan.

== Women's shogi professional ==
=== Promotion history ===
Hasegawa's promotion history is as follows:

- 2-kyū: October 1, 2011
- 1-dan: October 29, 2011
- 2-dan: February 2, 2012
- 3-dan: January 23, 2025

Note: All ranks are women's professional ranks.

=== Titles and other championships ===
Hasegawa has appeared in only one major title match to date. She challenged for the 5th MyNavi Women's Open Jo-Ō title in 2012, but lost.

== Personal life ==
On December 24, 2019, it was announced that Hasegawa had married professional go player Tōru Taniguchi. The announcement also stated that Hasegawa would continue to compete under her maiden name. "Joryū Kishi Dētabēsu: Fujita Aya Shō
