= Takanori An'yōji =

Japanese shogi player, ranked 7-dan

- Native name: 安用寺孝功
- Born: August 30, 1974 (age 51)
- Hometown: Uji

Career
- Achieved professional status: October 1, 1999 (aged 25)
- Badge number: 234
- Rank: 7-dan
- Teacher: Nobuo Mori (7-dan)
- Meijin class: C2
- Ryūō class: 6

Websites
- JSA profile page

Takanori An'yōji (安用寺 孝功, An'yōji Takanori; August 30, 1974) is a Japanese professional shogi player ranked 7-dan.

== Early life and apprenticeship ==
An'yōji was born in Uji, Kyoto Prefecture on August 30, 1974. In 1988, he finished runner up in the 42nd Amateur Meijin Tournament as second-grade junior high school student, and then entered the Japan Shogi Association's apprentice school at the rank of 6-kyū under the guidance of shogi professional Nobuo Mori later that year. He was promoted to 1-dan in 1994 and obtained full professional status and the rank of 4-dan in October 1999 after finishing 2nd in the 25th 3-dan League with a record of 13 wins and 5 losses.

== Shogi professional ==
=== Promotion history ===
An'yōji's promotion history is as follows:

- 6-kyū: 1998
- 1-dan: 1994
- 4-dan: October 1, 1999
- 5-dan: November 15, 2005
- 6-dan: February 10, 2009
- 7-dan: January 26, 2021
