= Akemi Yamada =

Japanese shogi player

- Native name: 山田朱未
- Born: May 18, 1980 (age 46)
- Hometown: Tamano, Okayama Prefecture

Career
- Achieved professional status: April 1, 2000 (aged 19)
- Badge number: W-29
- Rank: Women's 2-dan
- Teacher: Michio Ariyoshi (9-dan)

Websites
- JSA profile page

Akemi Yamada (山田 朱未, Yamada Akemi; born May 18, 1980) is a Japanese women's professional shogi player ranked 2-dan.

== Women's shogi professional ==
=== Promotion history ===
Yamada's promotion history is as follows.

- 2-kyū: April 1, 2000
- 1-kyū: April 1, 2001
- 1-dan: April 1, 2003
- 2-dan: March 5, 2009

Note: All ranks are women's professional ranks.
