= Sayuri Takebe =

Japanese shogi player (born 1978)

- Native name: 竹部さゆり
- Maiden name: Kimura (木村)
- Born: June 4, 1978 (age 47)
- Hometown: Zushi, Kanagawa

Career
- Achieved professional status: October 1, 1995 (aged 17)
- Badge Number: W-19
- Rank: Women's 4-dan
- Teacher: Hatasu Itō (7-dan)

Websites
- JSA profile page

Sayuri Takebe (竹部 さゆり, Takebe Sayuri; born June 4, 1978) is a Japanese women's professional shogi player ranked 4-dan.

== Women's shogi professional ==
=== Promotion history ===
Takebe's promotion history is as follows.

- Women's Professional Apprentice League: 1995
- 2-kyū: October 1, 1995
- 1-kyū: April 1, 1996
- 1-dan: October 19, 1996
- 2-dan: April 1, 1997
- 3-dan: March 20, 2003
- 4-dan: January 16, 2019

Note: All ranks are women's professional ranks.

=== Titles and other championships ===
Takebe has appeared in one women's major title match. She was the challenger for the 6th Kurashiki Tōka Cup title in 1996, but lost to Ichiyo Shimizu 2 games to none.
