= Yūgo Takeuchi =

Japanese shogi player

Takeuchi Yūgo
- Native name: 竹内雄悟
- Born: December 17, 1987 (age 37)
- Hometown: Hiroshima

Career
- Achieved professional status: April 1, 2013 (aged 25)
- Badge Number: 292
- Rank: 5-dan
- Teacher: Nobuo Mori (7-dan)
- Meijin class: Free
- Ryūō class: 5

Websites
- JSA profile page

Yūgo Takeuchi (竹内 雄悟, Takeuchi Yūgo; born December 17, 1987) is a Japanese professional shogi player ranked 5-dan.

== Early life and apprenticeship ==
Takeuchi was born in Hiroshima, Japan on December 17, 1987. He learned how to play shogi from his grandfather, and was accepted in to the Japanese Shogi Association's apprentice school at the rank of 3-kyū as student of shogi professional Nobuo Mori in 2004.

Takeuchi was promoted to the rank of 3-dan in 2008, and obtained full professional status and the rank of 4-dan in April 2013 after finishing second in the 52nd 3-dan League (October 2012 – March 2013) with a record of 13 wins and 5 losses.

== Shogi professional ==
=== Promotion history ===
The promotion history for Takeuchi is as follows:

- 3-kyū: September 2004
- 3-dan: October 2009
- 4-dan: April 1, 2013
- 5-dan: September 13, 2018
