= Chisa Hayamizu =

Japanese Shogi player

- Native name: 早水千紗
- Born: July 20, 1982 (age 43)
- Hometown: Meguro, Tokyo

Career
- Achieved professional status: October 1, 1996 (aged 14)
- Badge Number: W-20
- Rank: Women's 3-dan
- Teacher: Toshio Takayanagi (Honorary 9-dan)

Websites
- JSA profile page

Chisa Hayamizu (早水 千紗, Hayamizu Chisa; born July 20, 1982) is a Japanese women's professional shogi player ranked 3-dan.

== Women's shogi professional ==
=== Promotion history ===
Hayamizu's promotion history is as follows.

- 2-kyū: October 1, 1996
- 1-kyū: October 1, 1997
- 1-dan: April 1, 2000
- 2-dan: June 21, 2005
- 3-dan: December 7, 2012

Note: All ranks are women's professional ranks.
