= Yoshiyuki Kubota =

Japanese shogi player

- Native name: 窪田義行
- Born: May 18, 1972 (age 53)
- Hometown: Adachi, Tokyo

Career
- Achieved professional status: April 1, 1994 (aged 21)
- Badge number: 210
- Rank: 7-dan
- Teacher: Motoji Hanamura (9-dan)
- Meijin class: C2
- Ryūō class: 5

Websites
- JSA profile page
- Official website

Yoshiyuki Kubota (窪田 義行, Kubota Yoshiyuki; born May 18, 1972) is a Japanese professional shogi player, ranked 7-dan.

== Early life, amateur shogi and apprentice professional ==
Yoshiyuki Kubota was born in Adachi, Tokyo on May 18, 1972. In 1984, he won the 9th Elementary School Student Meijin Tournament, and later that same year entered the Japan Shogi Association's apprentice school at the rank of 6-kyū under the guidance of shogi professional Motoji Hanamura. He was promoted to 1-dan in 1988, and full professional status and the rank of 4-dan in April 1994.

== Shogi pprofessional ==
=== Promotion history ===
The promotion history for Kubota is as follows:

- 6-kyū: 1984
- 1-dan: 1988
- 4-dan: April 1, 1994
- 5-dan: August 1, 1998
- 6-dan: January 22, 2007
- 7-dan: June 1, 2016
