= Chihiro Idō =

Japanese shogi player

- Native name: 井道千尋
- Born: May 21, 1988 (age 37)
- Hometown: Suzu, Ishikawa

Career
- Achieved professional status: April 1, 2005 (aged 16)
- Badge Number: W-34
- Rank: Women's 2-dan
- Teacher: Yoshinori Kimura (9-dan)

Websites
- JSA profile page

Chihiro Idō (井道 千尋, Idō Chihiro; born May 21, 1988) is a Japanese women's professional shogi player ranked 2-dan.

== Women's shogi professional ==
=== Promotion history ===
Idō's promotion history is as follows.

- 2-kyū: April 1, 2005
- 1-kyū: April 1, 2006
- 1-dan: December 3, 2008
- 2-dan: June 28, 2017

Note: All ranks are women's professional ranks.
