= Minori Sasaki =

Japanese shogi player

- Native name: 佐々木海法
- Born: March 31, 2005 (age 20)
- Hometown: Ibaraki, Osaka, Japan

Career
- Achieved professional status: December 1, 2021 (aged 16)
- Badge Number: W-75
- Rank: Women's 1-dan
- Teacher: Nobuo Mori (7-dan)

Websites
- JSA profile page

Minori Sasaki (佐々木 海法, Sasaki Minori; born March 31, 2005) is a Japanese women's professional shogi player ranked 1-dan.

== Women's shogi professional ==
=== Promotion history ===
Sasaki's promotion history is as follows.

- 2-kyū: December 1, 2021
- 1-kyū: February 7, 2022
- 1-dan: April 1, 2024

Note: All ranks are women's professional ranks.
