= Nanako Hagita =

Japanese shogi player

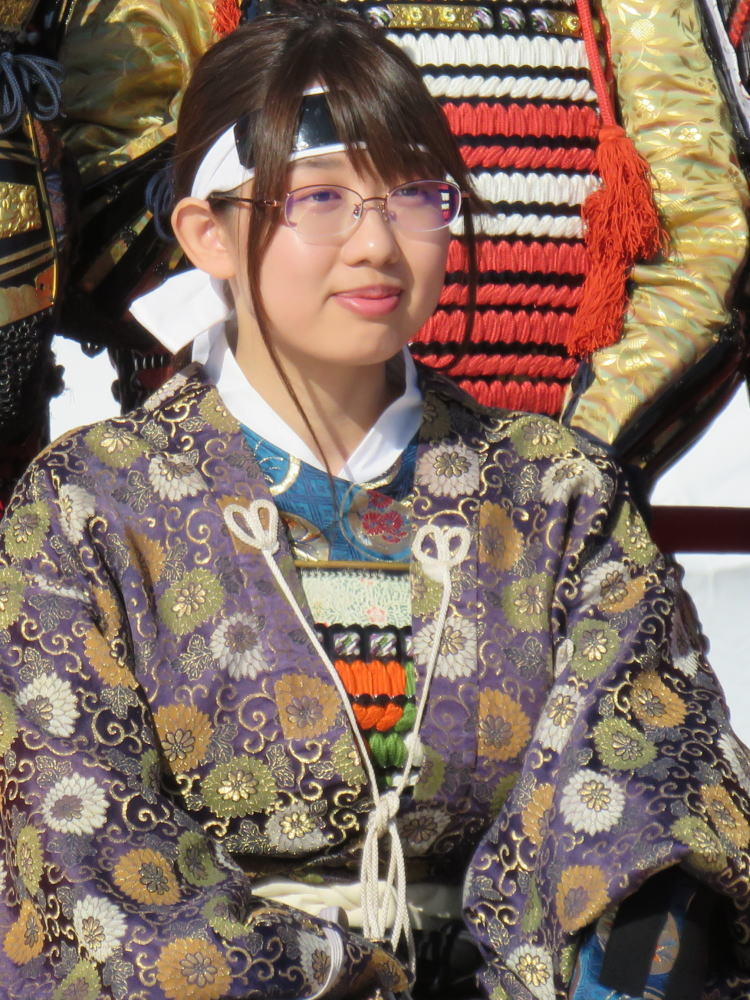
- Wakita at a human shogi event in 2019
- Native name: 萩田菜々子
- Maiden name: Wakita
- Born: March 7, 1997 (age 29)
- Hometown: Ichinomiya, Aichi

Career
- Achieved professional status: November 1, 2018 (aged 21)
- Badge number: W-66
- Rank: Women's 1-dan
- Teacher: Shōdo Nakada (7-dan)

Websites
- JSA profile page

Nanako Hagita (萩田 菜々子, Hagita Nanako; (née Wakita (脇田)) born March 7, 1997) is a Japanese women's professional shogi player ranked 1-dan.

== Women's shogi professional ==
=== Promotion history ===
Wakita's promotion history is as follows:

- 2-kyū: November 1, 2018
- 2-kyū: February 6, 2019
- 1-dan: April 1, 2020

Note: All ranks are women's professional ranks.

== Personal life ==
Wakita graduated from the Department of Human Studies of Meijo University in 2018.

On July 14, 2026, the Japan Shogi Association announced on its official website that Wakita had gotten married and would be competing under her married name "Hagita".
