= Ehoto Osogaguchi =

Japanese shogi player

- Native name: 獺ヶ口笑保人
- Born: October 22, 1999 (age 26)
- Hometown: Kumano, Mie, Japan

Career
- Achieved professional status: October 1, 2024 (aged 24)
- Badge Number: 343
- Rank: 4-dan
- Teacher: Nobuo Mori (7-dan)
- Meijin class: C2
- Ryūō class: 6

Websites
- JSA profile page

Ehoto Osogaguchi (獺ヶ口 笑保人, Osogaguchi Ehoto; October 22, 1999) is a Japanese professional shogi player ranked 4-dan.

== Early life and amateur shogi ==
Osogaguchi was born in Kumano, Mie, on October 22, 1999. Osogaguchi became interested in shogi after seeing is parents playing the game when he was four years old.

In May 2012, Osogaguchi won the inaugural J:COM Cup Sangatsu no Raion All-Japan children's shogi tournament (Note: The tournament takes its name from the popular Japanese manga series March Comes In like a Lion in which the protagonist is a young shogi player. MSO J:COM (a subsidiary of KDDI) is a main sponsor of the tournament, with additional cooperation given by the Japan Shogi Association and Hakusensha, the publisher of the series.) as the representative of the Osaka area as a first-year junior high school student, (Note: Osogaguchi is the first winner of the tournament to become a professional shogi player.) and he represented Mie Prefecture in the boy's division of the 33rd All Japan Junior High School Student Invitational Shogi Tournament in August 2012. His family, however, moved from Mie to Osaka after he graduated junior high school.

In June 2013, he entered the Japan Shogi Association's apprentice school at the rank of 6-kyū under the sponsorship of shogi professional Nobuo Mori. He was promoted to the rank of apprentice professional 3-dan in February 2023, and obtained regular professional status and the rank of 4-dan in October 2024 after winning the 75th 3-dan League (April–October 2024) with a record of 15 wins and 3 losses.

== Shogi professional ==
=== Promotion history ===
The promotion history for Osogaguchi is as follows.

- 6-kyū: June 2013
- 3-dan: February 2023
- 4-dan: October 1, 2024

== Personal life ==
As of September 2024, Osogaguchi is a student at Gunma University's Faculty of Medicine studying to become a doctor, specializing in neurology and researching Alzheimer's disease. Osogauchi has stated that even though he wanted to become a shogi professional from an early age, he thought the path would be difficult, particularly after getting demoted from apprentice professional 1-kyū to apprentice professional 2-kyū before turning 20 years old; (Note: Apprentice school rules state aspiring professionals must leave the school if they fail to be obtain promotion to apprentice professional 1-dan by their 21st birthday.) so, he also decided to pursue a career in medicine, and passed the entrance exam for Gunma University two years after graduating from high school. He hopes to one day to have careers both as a shogi professional and a doctor.
