= Hirotaka Nozuki =

Japanese shogi player

- Native name: 野月浩貴
- Born: July 4, 1973 (age 52)
- Hometown: Kita-ku, Sapporo
- Nationality: Japanese

Career
- Achieved professional status: October 1, 1996 (aged 23)
- Badge number: 221
- Rank: 8-dan
- Teacher: Osamu Katsūra (9-dan)
- Tournaments won: 2
- Meijin class: C1
- Ryūō class: 4

Websites
- JSA profile page

Hirotaka Nozuki (野月 浩貴 Nozuki [Nodzuki] Hirotaka, born July 4, 1973) is a Japanese professional shogi player, ranked 8-dan.

== Early life and apprenticeship ==
Hirotaka Nozuki was born in Kita-ku, Sapporo on July 4, 1973. He won the 10th Elementary School Student Meijin Tournament tournament in 1985, and the same year entered the Japan Shogi Association's apprentice school at the rank of 6-kyū as a student of shogi professional Osamu Katsūra. He was promoted to the rank of 1-dan in 1991 and obtained full professional status and the rank of 4-dan in October 1996.

== Shogi professional ==
=== Promotion history ===
The promotion history for Nozuki is as follows:

- 6-kyū: 1985
- 1-dan: 1991
- 4-dan: October 1, 1996
- 5-dan: October 10, 2000
- 6-dan: April 1, 2004
- 7-dan: April 1, 2005
- 8-dan: January 20, 2017

=== Titles and other championships ===
Nozuki has never appeared in a major title match, but he has won two non-major shogi championships during his career: the 17th Hayazashi Shineisen (1998) and the 19th All Star Kachinuki-sen (1998–99).

== Personal life ==
Nozuki is married to women's shogi professional Mana Watanabe. The two got married in January 2024.
