= Professional shogi player =

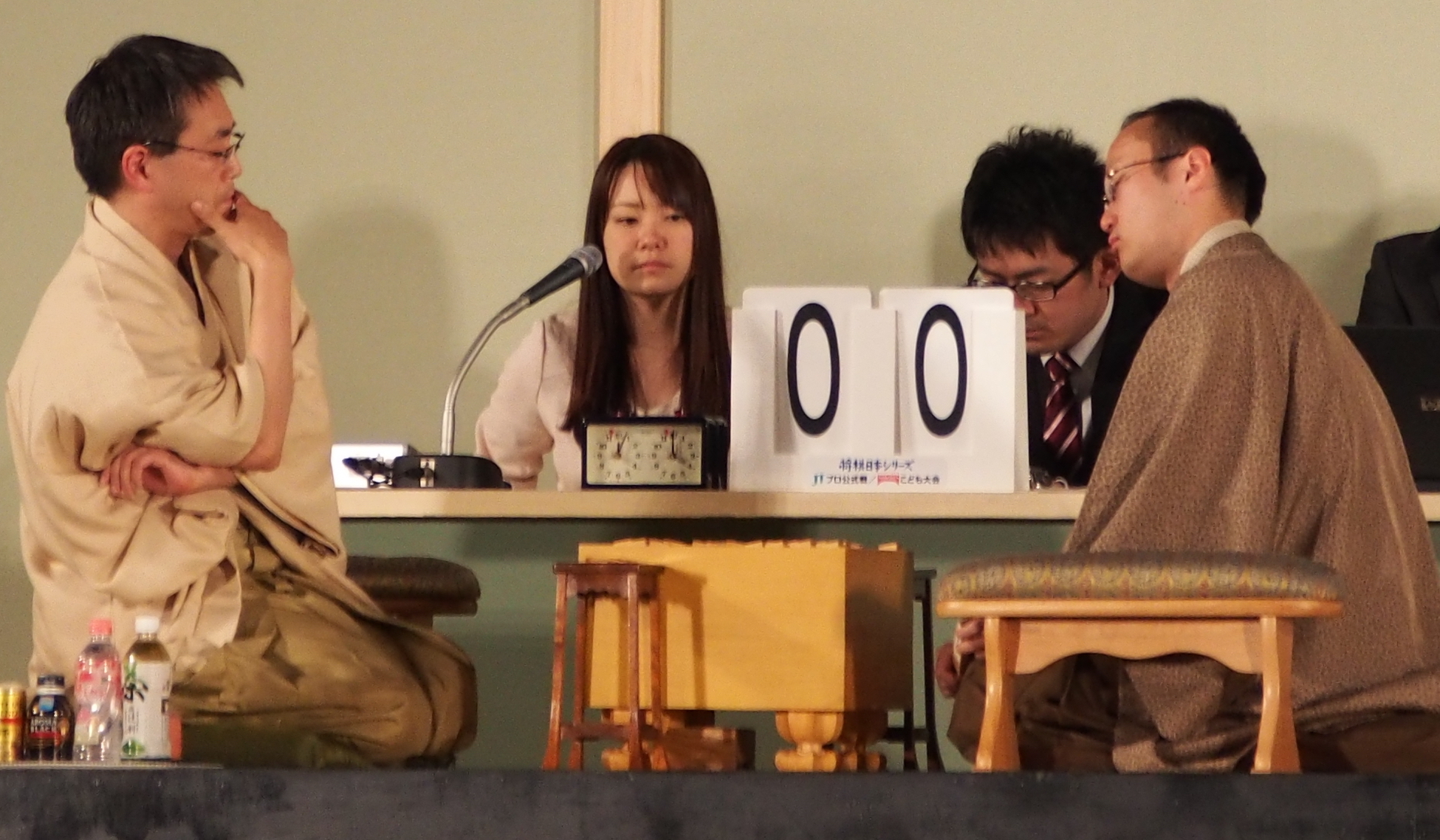
Professional shogi players, Yoshiharu Habu and Akira Watanabe, in 2014 with women's professional player Aya Fujita as timekeeper and (former) apprentice professional Naoto Kawasaki as game recorder

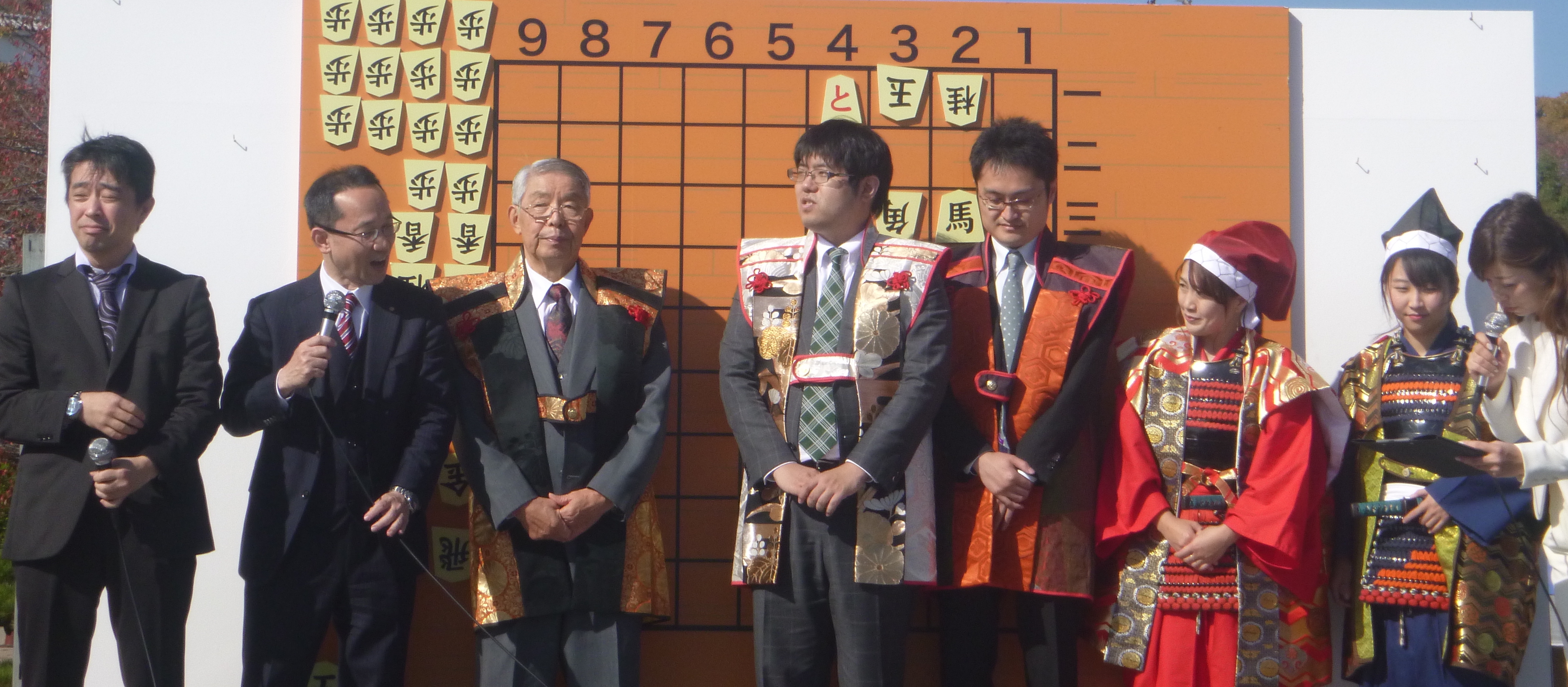
Professional shogi players at a human shogi exhibition match in Himeji, Japan in 2018. From left to right: Toshiaki Kubo, Keita Inoue, Masakazu Wakamatsu, Tetsurō Itodani, Akira Inaba, Shinobu Iwane, and Rei Takedomi.

A professional shogi player (shōgi kishi (将棋棋士) or puro kishi (プロ棋士)) is a shogi player who is usually a member of a professional guild of shogi players.

There are two categories of professional players: regular professional and women's professional. All regular professional shogi players are members of the Japan Shogi Association (JSA). However, only regular professional players, who are as of yet all male, are considered to be full-fledged members. Women's professional players belong to groups distinct from regular professional players. In Japanese, the term kishi (棋士) only refers to regular professional players to the exclusion of women's professionals, who are called joryū kishi (女流棋士).

== History ==
During the Edo period (1603–1868), shogi followed an iemoto system centered around three families (schools): the Ōhashi (main), the Ōhashi (branch) and the Itō. Titles such as Meijin were hereditary and could only be held by members of these three families. These three schools were supported by the Tokugawa shogunate and thus controlled the professional shogi world up until 1868 when the Meiji Restoration took place. By the time Sōin Itō, the eighth and last head of the Itō school and the 11th Hereditary Meijin, died in 1893, the influence of the families had decreased to such an extent that they had no real power at all.

The earliest form of the JSA was founded on September 8, 1924, as the Tokyo Shogi Federation (東京将棋連盟, tōkyō shōgi renmei) later renamed as the Japan Shogi Association (日本将棋連盟, nihon shōgi renmei).

== Ranking ==
All shogi players are ranked by a dan system. In the current system, apprentice players become professional when they achieve the rank of 4-dan. Apprentice players aspiring to become professionals are ranked from 6-kyū to 3-dan. Amateur and professional dan ranks are not equivalent with amateur 3- to 5-dan being roughly equivalent to apprentice professional 6-kyū and amateur 2- to 4-dan being roughly equivalent to women's professional 2-kyū.

Unlike western chess, shogi players do not have official Elo ratings; however, unofficial Elo scores may be calculated by shogi fans. (Note: For instance: http://kishi.a.la9.jp/ranking/2018.html or https://shogidata.info/list/rateranking.html) Unlike Elo scores (which may increase or decrease), players who achieve a certain dan are never demoted to a lower dan. Thus, the dan system may be thought as a performance milestone indicator or somewhat like the peak Elo rating that is used in western chess.

Apart from the dan system, players are also ranked according to their results in the Meijin ranking tournament. Their performance in the ranking tournament may also affect their ranking in the dan system. Unlike the dan system, a player may be demoted to a lower Meijin ranking tournament class (as well as promoted).

== Professional players ==
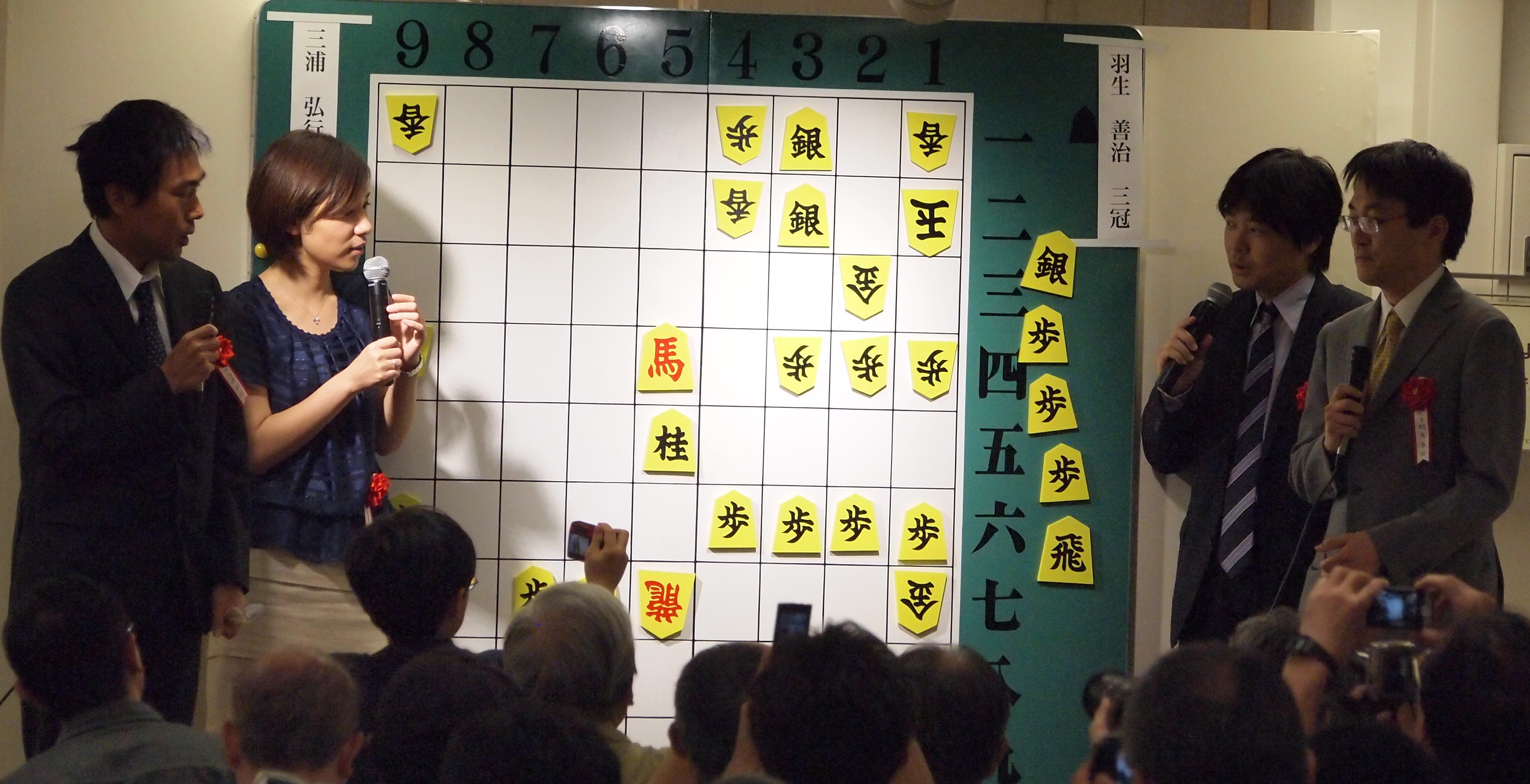
Professional shogi players Hiroyuki Miura, Rieko Yauchi (Women's professional), Takeshi Fujii and Yoshiharu Habu (from left to right) in 2013.

JSA professional shogi players (正規棋士 seiki kishi or 棋士 kishi for short) are ranked from four to nine dan. Players receive a monthly salary according to their rank as well as game fees based upon performance, which historically have mostly come from media conglomerates in exchange for exclusive publishing rights. In addition, popular players may also earn income from teaching, publishing, media appearances, etc.

The Professional Shogi Players Group is a voluntary organization operating with the JSA made up of all current regular professionals and some JSA women's professionals. It was founded in 2009 and helps organize events designed to further the spread of shogi as well as foster training and professionalism among shogi professionals.

=== Training group system ===
The JSA offers official "training" or "study" groups (研修会 kenshūkai) in Tokyo, Osaka, Nagoya, Fukuoka, Sendai and Sapporo where promising young amateur players can play instructional games against shogi professionals as well as official ranking games against other players of similar strength. These groups are open to all amateur-dan-ranked male and female players aged 20 years (25 years for females wanting to become a women's professional. In this case a master is required) and under who can pass the entrance examination and pay the required tuition and other fees. Players are divided into seven groups from S to F according to playing strength: S is the top group, while the strength of a typical Group F player is generally considered to be amateur 2-dan. Each group is further divided into two sub-groups, 1 and 2, with promotion and demotion from one group or sub-group to another being determined by actual game results. Players who perform at high levels in the top groups can qualify for entry into the Apprentice School (for Group S or A2, depending upon age) or provisional women's professional status (for Group C1) if they satisfy certain other conditions.

=== Apprenticeship ===
Strong amateurs wishing to become professional must be accepted into the JSA's Apprentice School (新進棋士奨励会 shinshin kishi shōreikai). Apprentice professionals are initially ranked from 6-kyū to 3-dan based upon their results on the apprentice school entry exam or performance in certain amateur tournaments. Apprentices are guided through the system by their master (師匠 shishō) — an active or retired professional who acts as their sponsor and teacher — and are promoted or demoted in rank based upon performance.

Players who successfully move up the ranks to 3-dan participate in the 3-dan League (三段リーグ san-dan riigu). This league is held twice yearly and the two top finishers of each league are promoted to 4-dan, thus gaining professional status. The 3-dan League was established in 1987 with an initial limit of four players qualifying for 4-dan promotion in response to a concern that the average of five to six new professionals every year was diluting the professional pool.

Amateurs of either gender can apply for entry into the apprentice school, but they must be promoted to 1-dan by age 21 and 4-dan by age 26 and those who are not must leave the school. Those newly promoted to 3-dan are given at least five chances to obtain promotion to professional status in the 3-dan League, with anyone under age 29 who can maintain a win rate over 50% in 3-dan League being allowed to stay. Anyone over age 21 who drops from 1-dan to 1-kyū must achieve promotion to 1-dan again in six months or leave the school.

In August 2019, the JSA clarified its position on current women's professional shogi players who obtain "regular" professional status via the apprentice school system. The JSA stated that women's professional shogi players who qualify for "regular" shogi professional status through the 3-dan league will be given the option of retaining their women's professional status and continuing to participate in women-only tournaments as long as they request to do so within two weeks of the date they are officially awarded regular professional status.

=== Professional Admission Test ===
There is an alternative way for amateurs to obtain professional status called the Professional Admission Test (プロ編入試験 puro henyū shiken) which was established by the JSA in 2006 in response to a former apprentice school 3-dan's successful attempt to become a professional. Shōji Segawa was unable to gain promotion to 4-dan professional before turning 26 in 1996, and thus was required to withdraw from the JSA's apprentice school. Segawa continued to play shogi as an amateur and won a number of national amateur tournaments which allowed him to qualify for tournaments involving professionals. Segawa's record of 17 wins and 5 losses against professionals in these tournaments led him to request that the JSA grant him another opportunity to become a professional. In response, the JSA made an ad hoc arrangement of six games for Segawa to play against a variety of opponents and stated that he would be granted 4-dan professional status if he won three games. Segawa's opponents included four professional players, one women's professional player, and one apprentice school 3-dan. The games were held from July to November 2005, and Segawa achieved his third win by winning game 5 on November 6, 2005, and was granted professional status by the JSA on the same day. Decades before Segawa, Motoji Hanamura also passed an ad hoc test to gain professional status. In 2014, the JSA announced the qualifications for those wishing to apply for the Professional Admission Test. In July 2014, the JSA announced that it had accepted the application submitted by amateur Kenji Imaizumi, a 41-year-old former apprentice school 3-dan. Imaizumi became the first amateur to successfully obtain professional status under the new system in December 2014. On February 25, 2020, Shōgo Orita, a former 3-dan apprentice school player who has a popular YouTube channel, became the second person under the new system and the fourth amateur overall to obtain professional status. On February 13, 2023, Reo Koyama became the third person under the new system and the fifth overall to obtain professional status.

In August 2019, the JSA clarified its position on the test as it pertains to current women's professional shogi players. The JSA stated that women's professional shogi players who successfully pass the test to obtain "regular" shogi professional status will retain their women's professional status and can continue to participate in women-only tournaments.

== Women's professionals ==
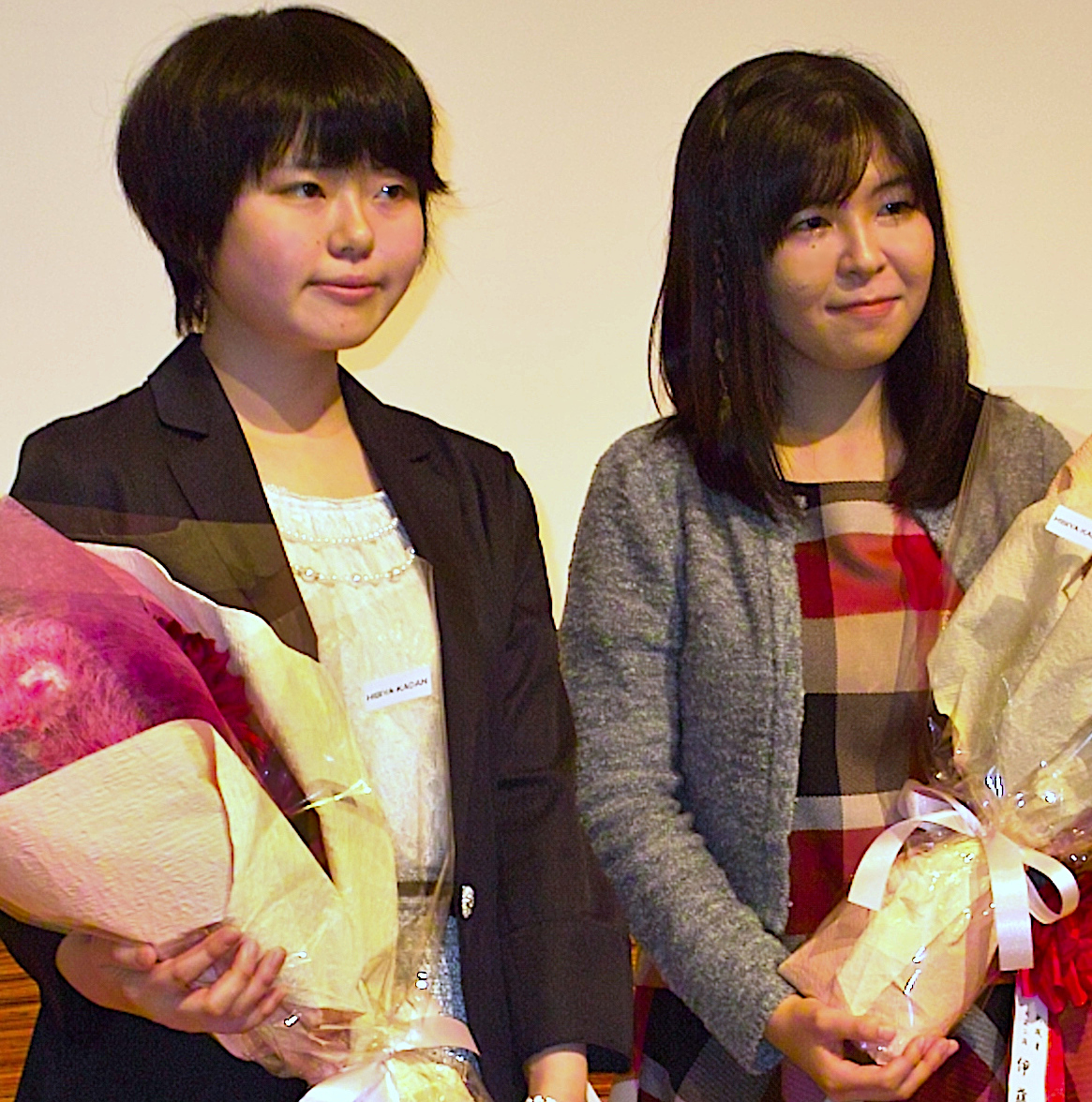
Women's professionals Momoko Katō 3-dan (left) and Sae Itō 2-dan (right) in 2015

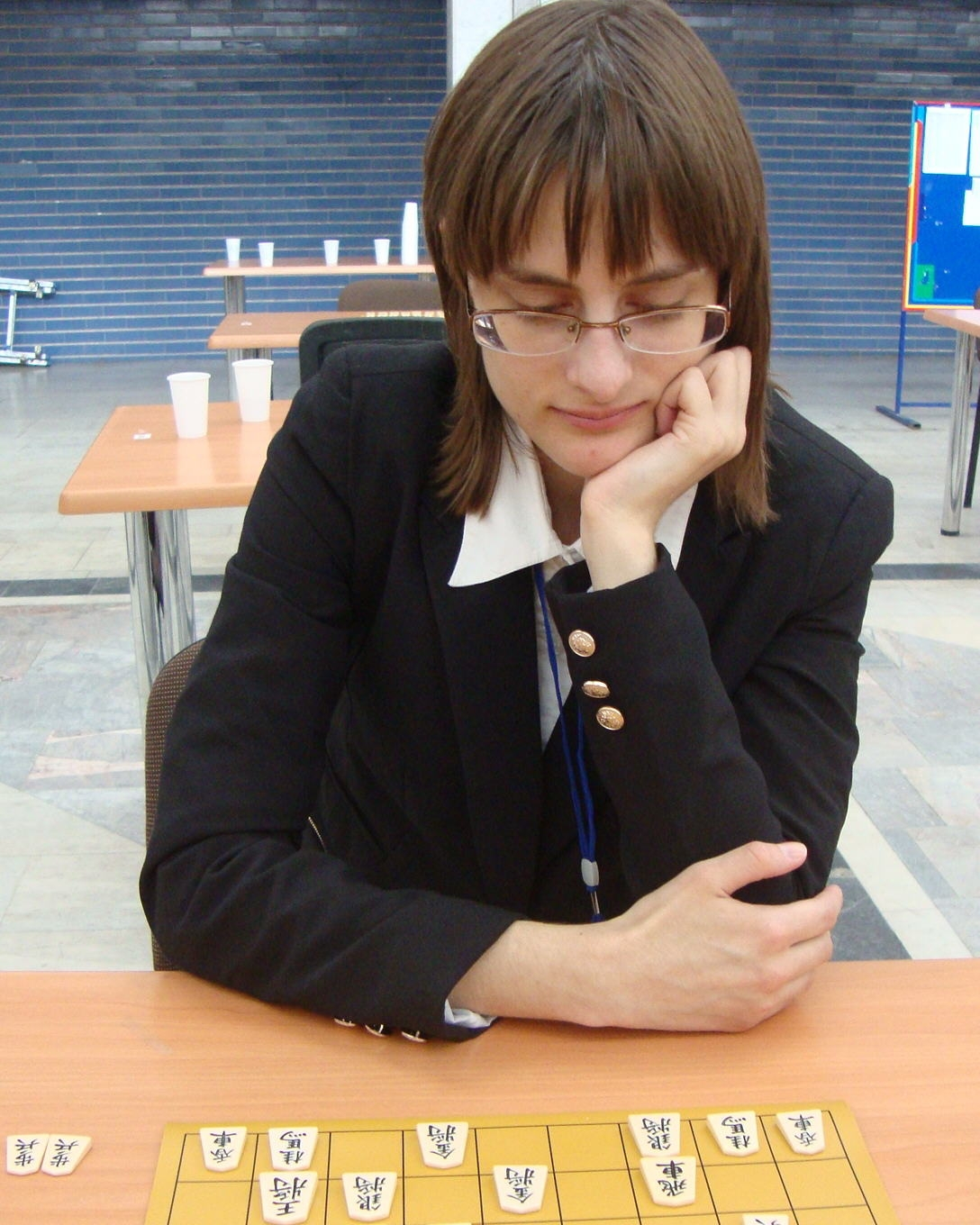
Karolina Styczyńska became the first non-Japanese professional shogi player in 2017

Women's professional players are in groups distinct from regular professional players. Until October 2026, no female had yet qualified to become a regular professional although over the years there had been several female apprentice professionals competing to obtain such status, with Kana Fukuma, Tomoka Nishiyama and Nanami Naka getting as far as the rank of 3-dan. In June 2025, however, the JSA declared that any woman who wins the Hakurei title five times earns the right to become a regular professional. In October 2026, Nishiyama won her fifth Hakurei title, which meant that she had earned the right to become the first female regular professional. At a press conference October 26, 2026, Nishiyama announced her intention to become the first female regular shogi professional on April 1, 2027.

There are two guilds of women's professionals: the Japan Shogi Association guild and the Ladies Professional Shogi-players' Association of Japan guild. Before the creation of the guilds, women were historically not allowed to become professional players.

=== JSA ===
The JSA has a separate system for women's professionals (女流棋士 Joryū Kishi) and ranks them from 3-kyū to 6-dan. Women's professionals are ranked and promoted differently than professionals (kishi) by the JSA. As of August 2019, there are 58 active JSA women's professionals. Strong women's professionals are able to participate in some tournaments with men, but most professional tournaments are restricted to regular professionals. However, there are also major title matches and other tournaments for women only. Many of the women's tournaments are also open to the public for amateur female players who are not members of the JSA or LPSA. Until the 1990s, the strongest women's professionals were considered to be roughly equivalent to 1- or 2-dan apprentices in playing strength. In recent years, the overall strength of women's professionals has improved and two (Fukuma and Nishiyama) have had performed well enough against regular professional in official games to qualify for the Professional Admission Test.

Strong female amateur players aged 25 or under who wish to become a women's professional must be accepted into the JSA's Kenshūkai (研修会 "training group"). Female amateurs who are promoted to Class C1 are granted the rank of provisional women's professional 3-kyū. Those achieving the provisional rank of 3-kyū have two years to gain promotion to the rank of 2-kyū and thus obtain regular women's professional status.

Prior to 1984, women's professionals were determined by their performance in national tournaments. From 1984 until March 2009, amateurs aspiring to become women professionals competed against each other in the Women's Professional Apprentice League (女流育成会 Joryū Ikuseikai), a system similar to the 3-dan League of the Professional Apprentice School. The winner of the league was promoted to women's professional 2-kyū. In April 2009, the JSA disbanded this system and merged it into the training group system.

Akiko Takojima joined the JSA in 1974 becoming the first women's professional. She was also the first female to join the Apprentice School and reached 1-dan before withdrawing. (Note: Takojima obtained promotion under the old apprentice school system and special promotion criteria different from those for male players were established by the JSA once she had reached the rank of apprentice professional 5-kyū to make it easier for her to obtain further promotion. The first female to obtain the rank of 1-dan under the current apprentice school system was Kana Satomi.) She later left the JSA to join the LPSA.

Naoko Hayashiba became the first women's professional to defeat a regular professional in 1991, but it was in an unofficial game. (Note: "Unofficial" games are typically played as part of some exhibition, local event or sponsor-held tournament; they do not count as part of a player's official win–loss record.) Hiroe Nakai became the first women's professional to defeat a regular professional in an official game in 1993.

In February 2017, Karolina Styczyńska became the first non-Japanese to be awarded full professional status when she was promoted to the rank of women's professional 2-kyū.

In April of 2025, the JSA initiated a regulation banning players from playing in title matches for six weeks before and eight weeks after childbirth; however, this regulation was removed in December of that same year. Instead, childbirth and pregnancy became listed that year as reasons for changing the schedule of matches.

JSA women's professionals have their own voluntary association operating within the JSA called the Ladies Professional Players Group. The association was founded in 1989 and helps organize events involving JSA women's professionals designed to further the spread of shogi.

=== LPSA ===
Other women's professional players are members of the Ladies Professional Shogi-players' Association of Japan (LPSA), which is a professional guild of women's professionals separate from the JSA. The LPSA was formed in 2007 due to disagreements between women's professionals and the JSA over money and governance.

== Promotion ==
Regular professionals (kishi) are ranked from 4- to 9-dan. All new professionals start at 4-dan and are subsequently promoted based upon criteria established by the JSA. A similar system exists for women's professionals who have their own separate ranking system from 2-kyū to 6-dan. Satisfying one of the required criteria is sufficient for promotion. The JSA board of directors may also promote active professionals for exemplary results, etc. when deemed appropriate, and upon their official retirement in consideration of the number of years active, etc.

=== Regular professional status ===
The promotion criteria for regular professionals are as follows.

Rank	Status	Criteria
4-dan	Apprentice professionals	Win outright or finish in sole 2nd place in 3-Dan League play; Obtain 2 promotion points in 3-Dan League play (Note: Promotion points (次点 (Jiten)) are awarded to apprentice professionals who finish in third place in 3-dan league play. Obtaining two promotion points gives an apprentice professional the option of obtaining full-professional status as a "free-class" player.)
4-dan	Amateurs and Women's professionals	Pass the Professional Admission Test; Win the Hakurei women's professional major title five times (Women's professionals only)
5-dan	4-dan players	Win 100 official games; Win tournament open to all professionals; Become official challenger for a major title; Be promoted to Meijin Class C1; Be promoted two consecutive times in Ryūō tournament ranking games or win three Ryūō ranking groups overall
6-dan	5-dan players	Win 120 official games since promotion to 5-dan; Win tournament open to all professionals since promotion to 5-dan; Become official challenger for a major title since promotion to 5-dan; Be promoted consecutive times in Ryūō tournament ranking games or win three Ryūō ranking groups overall since promotion to 5-dan; Be promoted to Meijin Class B2; Be promoted to Ryūō ranking group 2
7-dan	6-dan players	Win 150 official games since promotion to 6-dan; Win tournament open to all professionals since promotion to 6-dan; Win major title; Be promoted to Meijin Class B1; Become challenger for Ryūō title; Be promoted consecutive times in Ryūō tournament ranking games or win three Ryūō ranking groups overall since promotion to 6-dan; Be promoted to Ryūō ranking group 1
8-dan	7-dan players	Win 190 official games since promotion to 7-dan; Win two major titles (Note: New criterion announced by JSA on May 22, 2018. Effective as of June 1, 2018.); Be promoted to Meijin Class A; Win the Ryūō title
9-dan	8-dan players	Win 250 official games since promotion to 8-dan; Win three major titles (Note: A player who wins three major titles while ranked lower than 8-dan, however, cannot be directly promoted to 9-dan; they must first satisfy the criteria for promotion to 8-dan.); Win the Meijin title; Win the Ryūō title twice

=== Women's professional status ===
The promotion criteria for women's professionals are as follows.

Rank	Status	Criteria
3-kyū	Amateurs (training group members)	Provisional women's professional status based upon results achieved in training group play. A player who has been promoted to Group C1 and has played at least 48 official games can apply for provisional professional status and the rank of 3-kyū; however, they must achieve one of the promotion criteria for 2-kyū or above within a two-year period or their provisional status will be revoked. A player who loses her provisional status can return to Group C2. Female amateurs under the age of 27 who reach the quarterfinals of an official women's tournament may also apply for provisional professional status; however, they must do so within two weeks of the result or lose the right to do so. They can, however, repeat the process up to three times. Players still considered to be minors need to have the consent of their parent or guardian to apply. Players who belong to the JSA are required to have a professional player as their sponsor; those without sponsors will be granted a grace period of six months before losing the right to apply for provisional status.
2-kyū	3-kyū players	Achieve a number of wins equal to the number of official tournaments participated in a one-year period; Achieve a winning percentage of 75% or more in official women's tournaments over a two-year period; Advance to the semifinals of the Women's Yamada Challenge Cup; Satisfy the criteria for Women's professional 1-kyū
2-kyū	Amateurs (training group members)	Be age 27 or younger (Note: Training group members as of March 31, 2023, are granted a one-year extension to qualify.); Be promoted to training group B1 and have played in at least 48 games since becoming a training group member. (Note: Training group members who qualify but have yet to play 48 games will be awarded the rank of 2-kyū upon completion of their 48the game; members who are demoted from B1 to B2 before playing 48 games lose the chance to be promoted and need to start the process again.); Be accepted into training group B1 or above and have played in at least 48 games since becoming a training group member.; Win the Women's Yamada Challenge Cup; Advance to the quarterfinals of the Kurashiki Tōka Cup; Advance to the quarterfinals of the Women's Ōza main tournament; Advance to the quarterfinals of the Mynavi Women's Open main tournament; Advance to the quarterfinals of the Women's Ōshō tournament
1-kyū	2-kyū players	Win 30 official games since promotion to 2-kyū; Win at least 50% (7 or more wins) of total official games played in a one-year period since promotion to 2-kyū; Advance to the final of the Women's Yamada Challenge Cup; Advance to the quarter-finals of the Kurashiki Tōka Cup; Be promoted to the Women's Ōshō League; Be promoted to Women's Ōi League; Advance to the finals of the Women's Meijin League preliminary tournament; Advance to the Women's Ōza main tournament; Advance to the Mynavi Women's Open main tournament
1-dan	1-kyū players	Win 50 official games since promotion to 1-kyū; Win at least 50% (7 or more wins) of total official games played in a one-year period since promotion to 1-kyū; Win the Women's Yamada Challenge Cup; Advance to the semi-finals of the Kurashiki Tōka Cup; Advance to the semi-finals of the Women's Ōshō tournament; Avoid demotion from the Women's Ōi League; Be promoted to the Women's Meijin League; Advance to the semi-finals of the Women's Ōza tournament; Advance to the semi-finals of the Mynavi Women's Open main tournament
2-dan	1-dan players	Win 60 official games since promotion to 1-dan; Become challenger for a major women's title
3-dan	2-dan players	Win 90 official games since promotion to 2-dan; Win a major women's title
4-dan	3-dan players	Win 120 official games since promotion to 3-dan; Win three major titles
5-dan	4-dan players	Win 150 official games since promotion to 4-dan; Win seven major titles
6-dan (and above)	5-dan players	Reserved for women's professionals who have achieved exemplary results over their career as determined by the JSA board of directors

== Tournaments ==
Professional players compete in a number of title tournaments as well as non-title tournaments. The two most prestigious are the tournaments for the Meijin title and the Ryūō title.

=== Titles ===
There are eight major title tournaments and several non-title tournaments held yearly for regular professionals. Some of these tournaments are also open to qualifying women's professionals and amateur players. The oldest is the Meijin, which is historically connected to the hereditary title system established in the 17th century during the time of the Tokugawa shogunate and later became a tournament title in 1937. The newest title tournament is the Eiō, which became a title tournament in 2017.

==== Title tournaments ====
Below are the names of the title tournaments along with the current titleholders.

Titles
Title name	Japanese name	Titleholder
Eiō	叡王	Takumi Itō
Kiō	棋王	Sōta Fujii
Kisei	棋聖	Sōta Fujii
Meijin	名人	Sōta Fujii
Ōi	王位	Sōta Fujii
Ōshō	王将	Sōta Fujii
Ōza	王座	Akihito Hirose
Ryūō	竜王	Sōta Fujii

==== Non-title tournaments ====
The following are the current non-title tournaments.

Non-title tournaments
Name	Japanese name	Defending champion
Asahi Cup Open	朝日杯将棋オープン戦	Sōta Fujii
Ginga Tournament	銀河戦	Masayuki Toyoshima
NHK Cup	NHK杯テレビ将棋トーナメント	Sōta Fujii
JT Nihon Series	JT将棋日本シリーズ	Sōta Fujii
Shinjin-Ō	新人王戦	Shin'ichirō Hattori
Kakogawa Seiryū Tournament	加古川青流戦	Ryūma Yoshiike
Tatsujin Tournament	達人戦立川立飛杯	Toshiyuki Moriuchi

=== Women's tournaments ===
There are eight major title tournaments as well as several non-title tournament held for women's professionals, and some of these are open to female amateur players. The oldest title tournament is the Women's Meijin tournament (established in 1974) and the newest is the Hakurei tournament (established in 2020).

==== Title tournaments ====
Below are the names of the title tournaments along with the current titleholders.

Title name	Japanese name	Titleholder
Women's Meijin	女流名人	Tomoka Nishiyama
Women's Ōshō	女流王将	Tomoka Nishiyama
Women's Ōi	女流王位	Kana Fukuma
Kurashiki Tōka	倉敷藤花	Kana Fukuma
Queen	女王	Kana Fukuma
Women's Ōza	女流王座	Kana Fukuma
Seirei	清麗	Tomoka Nishiyama
Hakurei	白玲	Tomoka Nishiyama

==== Non-title tournaments ====
The following are the current non-title tournaments.

Name	Japanese name	Defending champion
Yamada Women's Challenge Cup	YAMADA女流チャレンジ杯	Yui Isoya
Shirataki Ayumi Cup	白瀧あゆみ杯争奪戦	Rei Takedomi

== Computer shogi ==
=== Human versus computer ===
In October 2005, professional players were instructed that they were banned from playing public games against computers without the permission of the JSA. The JSA said the reason for doing this was due to the increasing strength of shogi software programs and concerns that even a single professional player losing to a computer could give the public the impression that professionals "are weaker than the software". It was also believed that the JSA wanted to have more control over any future commercial opportunities associated with such games, and was asking "organizers pay a sponsorship fee of at least ¥100 million per game". Kunio Yonenaga, the JSA president who instituted the ban, later elaborated on the reasons for the ban in a 2011 interview by saying, "If a professional shogi player wins a match against a computer, it's no news. But when a pro loses, it turns into a big deal".

A number of official games between professionals and computers have taken place since the ban went into effect. In March 2007, reigning Ryūō titleholder Akira Watanabe defeated the program "Bonanza" in the first official game since the ban was instituted, but women's professional Ichiyo Shimizu became the first professional, man or woman, to lose to a computer in an official game when she lost to "Akara 2010" in October 2010. In January 2012, the program "Bonkras" defeated then JSA president and retired former Meijin Yonenaga. Shin'ichi Satō became the first active male professional to lose to a computer when he lost to the program "Ponanza" in March 2013, and Hiroyuki Miura became the first active "Class A" professional to lose to a computer when he lost to the program "GPS Shogi" in April 2013. Miura was participating in a match between five active male professionals and five computer programs held in March and April 2013. The match was won by the computers with a score of three wins, one draw and one loss. A second team match was held in March and April 2014 with the computers winning four out of the five games played. A third team match was held in March and April 2015 with the professionals winning three games and losing two.

In June 2015, it was decided that the team match format was to be replaced by a two-game match (two days per game) between the winners of respective human and computer qualifying tournaments sponsored by the JSA and telecommunications company Dwango. Takayuki Yamasaki and the program "Ponanza" started the best-of-two game 1st Denō Match in April 2016, and Yamasaki lost the match 2–0.

On February 22, 2017, the JSA announced that the "Denou Sen" matches between computers and professional players sponsored by Dwango would end in 2017. According to the chairman of Dwango, "These serious battles between humans and software have completed their historic role". On April 1, 2017, Meijin Amahiko Satō became the first reigning major titleholder to lose an official game to a computer when he lost Game 1 of the 2nd Denō Match to the computer representative Ponanza.

=== Human versus human ===
In October 2016, the JSA announced new rules which require players to keep their smartphones or other electronic devices in their lockers during official match games. Players will also be banned from leaving the JSA buildings in Tokyo and Osaka during official games. The JSA said the new rules were needed to prevent "high-tech cheating" by players using shogi apps installed on the devices themselves or from using the devices remotely access off-site personal computers for assistance during games. The move was made in response to the increasing strength of computer software in recent years, including a number of results where computers have beaten professional players in official games. As computer shogi programs have gotten stronger, the number of players using them for match preparation and post-game analysis has increased, giving rise to concerns about the possibility of cheating during games. The new rules took effect in December 2016.

On February 10, 2017, the JSA announced that two professional players were the first to be fined for leaving the playing site during official games under the new rules. The two players were spotted by others leaving the playing site during their meal breaks for official games held on February 7 and February 8, 2016, respectively. The JSA fined each player 50% of the amount they were to receive as a game fee and strongly warned them to avoid making the same mistake again.

== List of professional players ==
The following are lists of current JSA regular and women's professionals, and LPSA professionals. The lists do not include the names of deceased, retired or former professionals

=== JSA ===
==== Regular professionals ====
The following is list of active JSA regular professionals as of November 18, 2026. The players are listed in the order of their JSA badge number.

Table no.	Badge no.	Name	Rank
1	131	Kōji Tanigawa	9-dan
2	142	Michio Takahashi	9-dan
3	143	Osamu Nakamura	9-dan
4	146	Akira Shima	9-dan
5	147	Yoshikazu Minami	9-dan
6	148	Yasuaki Tsukada	9-dan
7	149	Hiroshi Kamiya	8-dan
8	157	Keita Inoue	9-dan
9	161	Taku Morishita	9-dan
10	162	Masahiko Urano	8-dan
11	164	Ichirō Hiura	8-dan
12	168	Eisaku Tomioka	9-dan
13	171	Takashi Abe	9-dan
14	175	Yoshiharu Habu	9-dan
15	176	Isao Nakata	8-dan
16	179	Kenji Kanzaki	8-dan
17	182	Yasumitsu Satō	9-dan
18	183	Toshiyuki Moriuchi	9-dan
19	184	Daisuke Nakagawa	8-dan
20	185	Manabu Senzaki	9-dan
21	189	Nobuyuki Yashiki	9-dan
22	192	Mamoru Hatakeyama	8-dan
23	193	Naruyuki Hatakeyama	8-dan
24	194	Tadahisa Maruyama	9-dan
25	195	Masataka Gōda	9-dan
26	196	Shūji Satō	8-dan
27	197	Masataka Sugimoto	8-dan
28	198	Takeshi Fujii	9-dan
29	199	Shingo Hirafuji	7-dan
30	200	Takahiro Toyokawa	7-dan
31	201	Kōichi Fukaura	9-dan
32	202	Keiichi Sanada	8-dan
33	203	Hiroki Iizuka	8-dan
34	204	Hiroyuki Miura	9-dan
35	207	Toshiaki Kubo	9-dan
36	208	Hisashi Namekata	9-dan
37	209	Hiroshi Okazaki	7-dan
38	210	Yoshiyuki Kubota	7-dan
39	211	Kensuke Kitahama	8-dan
40	212	Norihiro Yagura	7-dan
41	213	Daisuke Suzuki	9-dan
42	214	Tadao Kitajima	7-dan
43	215	Kiyokazu Katsumata	7-dan
44	216	Yoshiyuki Matsumoto	7-dan
45	217	Kōsuke Tamura	7-dan
46	218	Kazushiza Horiguchi	8-dan
47	220	Masakazu Kondō	7-dan
48	221	Hirotaka Nozuki	8-dan
49	222	Kazuki Kimura	9-dan
50	223	Hiroshi Kobayashi	8-dan
51	224	Shin'ya Satō	7-dan
52	226	Hideyuki Takano	7-dan
53	227	Takayuki Yamasaki	8-dan
54	229	Shin'ya Yamamoto	6-dan
55	231	Ayumu Matsuo	8-dan
56	233	Chikara Akutsu	8-dan
57	234	Takanori An'yōji	7-dan
58	235	Akira Watanabe	9-dan
59	236	Eiji Iijima	8-dan
60	237	Sakio Chiba	7-dan
61	240	Makoto Sasaki	7-dan
62	241	Atsushi Miyata	7-dan
63	242	Tomohiro Murata	7-dan
64	243	Takehiro Ōhira	6-dan
65	246	Hiroaki Yokoyama	7-dan
66	247	Ryō Shimamoto	6-dan
67	248	Akira Nishio	7-dan
68	249	Yasuaki Murayama	8-dan
69	250	Kazutoshi Satō	7-dan
70	251	Daisuke Katagami	7-dan
71	252	Ryōsuke Nakamura	6-dan
72	253	Shūji Muranaka	7-dan
73	254	Satoru Sakaguchi	6-dan
74	255	Akihito Hirose	9-dan
75	256	Yūya Nagaoka	6-dan
76	257	Issei Takazaki	7-dan
77	258	Yūsuke Tōyama	6-dan
78	259	Shōji Segawa	6-dan
79	260	Tetsurō Itodani	9-dan
80	261	Taichi Nakamura	8-dan
81	262	Makoto Tobe	7-dan
82	263	Amahiko Satō	9-dan
83	264	Masayuki Toyoshima	9-dan
84	265	Kōta Kanai	7-dan
85	266	Shingo Itō	6-dan
86	267	Akihiro Murata	6-dan
87	268	Takuma Oikawa	7-dan

Table no.	Badge no.	Name	Rank
88	269	Akira Inaba	8-dan
89	270	Yūichi Tanaka	6-dan
90	271	Shin'ichi Satō	6-dan
91	272	Kazuhiro Nishikawa	7-dan
92	273	Masakazu Watanabe	6-dan
93	274	Shingo Sawada	7-dan
94	275	Tadashi Ōishi	7-dan
95	276	Takuya Nagase	9-dan
96	277	Kenjirō Abe	7-dan
97	278	Tatsuya Sugai	8-dan
98	279	Mitsunori Makino	6-dan
99	280	Yūki Sasaki	8-dan
100	281	Kōhei Funae	7-dan
101	282	Keita Kadokura	6-dan
102	283	Kōru Abe	7-dan
103	284	Taichi Takami	7-dan
104	285	Tetsuya Fujimori	6-dan
105	286	Shintarō Saitō	8-dan
106	287	Wataru Yashiro	8-dan
107	288	Wataru Kamimura	5-dan
108	289	Naohiro Ishida	7-dan
109	290	Hiromu Watanabe	6-dan
110	291	Shōta Chida	8-dan
111	292	Yūgo Takeuchi	5-dan
112	293	Kentarō Ishii	7-dan
113	294	Tatsuya Sanmaidō	7-dan
114	295	Yoshitaka Hoshino	5-dan
115	296	Hiroshi Miyamoto	6-dan
116	297	Yasuhiro Masuda	8-dan
117	298	Reo Kurosawa	6-dan
118	299	Kenji Imaizumi	5-dan
119	300	Mirai Aoshima	6-dan
120	301	Hirotaka Kajiura	7-dan
121	302	Satoshi Takano	6-dan
122	303	Seiya Kondō	7-dan
123	304	Ryuma Tonari	7-dan
124	305	Junpei Ide	5-dan
125	306	Daichi Sasaki	7-dan
126	307	Sōta Fujii	9-dan
127	308	Takahiro Ōhashi	7-dan
128	309	Takuya Nishida	5-dan
129	310	Kazuo Sugimoto	6-dan
130	311	Asuto Saitō	6-dan
131	312	Yūta Komori	5-dan
132	313	Kōhei Hasebe	5-dan
133	314	Takashi Ikenaga	7-dan
134	315	Kei Honda	6-dan
135	316	Hiroshi Yamamoto	5-dan
136	317	Wakamu Deguchi	6-dan
137	318	Takayuki Kuroda	6-dan
138	319	Kazushi Watanabe	7-dan
139	320	Yūta Ishikawa	5-dan
140	321	Shōgo Orita	5-dan
141	322	Shin'ichirō Hattori	6-dan
142	323	Hiroki Taniai	5-dan
143	324	Takumi Itō	7-dan
144	325	Seiya Tomita	5-dan
145	326	Yūsei Koga	6-dan
146	327	Akihiro Ida	5-dan
147	328	Akihiro Takada	5-dan
148	329	Tomoki Yokoyama	4-dan
149	330	Mikio Kariyama	5-dan
150	331	Reo Okabe	6-dan
151	332	Kenshi Tokuda	5-dan
152	333	Nagisa Fujimoto	6-dan
153	334	Yūya Saitō	4-dan
154	335	Reo Koyama	4-dan
155	336	Naoki Koyama	4-dan
156	337	Saito Morimoto	4-dan
157	338	Kanta Masegi	5-dan
158	339	Kenta Miyajima	4-dan
159	340	Hirotoshi Ueno	5-dan
160	341	Taiki Yamakawa	4-dan
161	342	Yūjirō Takahashi	4-dan
162	343	Ehoto Osogaguchi	4-dan
163	344	Ryūma Yoshiike	4-dan
164	345	Yūki Saitō	4-dan
165	346	Toshiki Sumisaki	4-dan
166	347	Rintarō Iwamura	4-dan
167	348	Hiroto Ikegaki	4-dan
168	349	Shiryū Katayama	4-dan
169	350	Kazuki Yamashita	4-dan
170	351	Ao Kokubo	4-dan
171	352	Jōdai Furui	4-dan
172	353	Yūto Kawamura	4-dan
173	354	Haruma Watanabe	4-dan
174	355	Shōta Kunii	4-dan

==== Women's professionals ====
The following is list of active JSA women's professionals as of July 22, 2026. The players are listed in the order of their women's JSA badge number. All ranks are women's professional ranks.

Table no.	Badge no.	Name	Rank
1	W5	Chikako Nagasawa	5-dan
2	W6	Kumi Yamada	4-dan
3	W7	Ichiyo Shimizu	7-dan
4	W10	Sumie Ishitaka	2-dan
5	W14	Sayuri Honda	4-dan
6	W16	Rieko Yauchi	5-dan
7	W17	Ryōko Chiba	5-dan
8	W19	Sayuri Takebe	4-dan
9	W20	Chisa Hayamizu	4-dan
10	W23	Aya Fujita	2-dan
11	W25	Akemi Yamada	2-dan
12	W26	Hatsumi Ueda	5-dan
13	W28	Chiho Murata	3-dan
14	W29	Kanna Suzuki	3-dan
15	W30	Marika Nakamura	4-dan
16	W31	Minami Sadamasu	2-dan
17	W32	Shinobu Iwane	3-dan
18	W33	Kana Fukuma	6-dan
19	W34	Chihiro Idō	2-dan
20	W35	Io Murota	3-dan
21	W36	Manaka Inagawa	2-dan
22	W37	Shino Miyasō	2-dan
23	W39	Eriko Yamaguchi	3-dan
24	W40	Manao Kagawa	4-dan
25	W41	Mio Watanabe	2-dan
26	W42	Yuki Muroya	3-dan
27	W44	Yūki Hasegawa	2-dan
28	W46	Keika Kitamura	2-dan
29	W47	Haruka Aikawa	1-dan
30	W48	Ai Iino	1-dan
31	W49	Kotomi Yamane	3-dan
32	W50	Aki Wada	2-dan
33	W51	Erika Tsukada	2-dan
34	W52	Sae Itō	3-dan
35	W53	Saya Nakazawa	2-dan
36	W54	Aiko Takahama	1-dan

Table no.	Badge no.	Name	Rank
37	W56	Saki Kawamata	2-dan
38	W57	Sakura Ishimoto	3-dan
39	W58	Nana Yorimoto	2-dan
40	W60	Rei Takedomi	2-dan
41	W61	Sakiko Odaka	1-dan
42	W62	Miyu Mizumachi	1-dan
43	W63	Nana Fujii	1-dan
44	W64	Kei Katō	2-dan
45	W65	Yuria Katō	2-dan
46	W66	Nanako Wakita	1-dan
47	W67	Momoko Katō	4-dan
48	W68	Nikori Yamaguchi	1-kyū
49	W69	Hana Wada	1-kyū
50	W70	Miran Nohara	2-dan
51	W71	Aya Uchiyama	1-dan
52	W72	Kirari Yamaguchi	1-kyū
53	W73	Tomoka Nishiyama	5-dan
54	W74	Ayaka Ōshima	2-dan
55	W75	Minori Sasaki	1-dan
56	W76	Mihoko Iwasa	1-kyū
57	W77	Nana Sakaki	2-kyū
58	W78	Mirei Kamada	2-kyū
59	W79	Juri Kimura	1-dan
60	W80	Mikoto Umezu	1-kyū
61	W81	Marin Matsushita	1-dan
62	W82	Shōko Kubo	1-kyū
63	W83	Aya Imai	1-dan
64	W84	Saki Miyazawa	1-dan
65	W85	Riko Morimoto	2-kyū
66	W86	Kanade Sunahara	2-kyū
67	W87	Chihiro Sakihara	1-kyū
68	W88	Mao Itō	2-kyū
69	W89	Yuzuki Takeuchi	2-kyū
70	W90	Natsuko Iwasaki	1-dan
71	W91	Nanami Naka	3-dan
72	W92	Hiyori Yagi	2-kyū

=== LPSA ===
The following is list of active LPSA women's professionals as of October 1, 2024. The players are listed in the order of their LPSA badge number. All ranks are women's professional ranks.

Table no.	Badge no.	Name	Rank
1	12	Hiromi Nakakura	2-dan
2	13	Saori Shimai	2-dan
3	16	Kaori Uekawa	2-dan
4	19	Mana Watanabe	3-dan
5	20	Ayano Hori	1-dan
6	21	Maho Isotani	1-dan
7	22	Saki Tanaka	1-kyū
8	23	Yui Isoya	2-dan

== See also ==
- Japan Shogi Association
- Ladies Professional Shogi-players' Association of Japan
