= Masahiko Urano =

Japanese professional shogi player

- Native name: 浦野真彦
- Born: March 14, 1964 (age 61)
- Hometown: Osaka Prefecture
- Nationality: Japanese

Career
- Achieved professional status: October 19, 1983 (aged 19)
- Badge Number: 162
- Rank: 8-dan
- Teacher: Sutekichi Nakai (8-dan)
- Meijin class: Free
- Ryūō class: 6

Websites
- JSA profile page

Masahiko Urano (浦野 真彦, Urano Masahiko; March 14, 1964) is a Japanese professional shogi player ranked 8-dan.

== Early life and apprenticeship ==
Urano was born in Osaka Prefecture on March 14, 1964. In October 1977, he was accepted into entered the Japan Shogi Association's apprentice school at the rank of 6-kyū under the tutelage of shogi professional Sutekichi Nakai. He was promoted to 1-dan in 1990 and obtained full professional status and the rank of 4-dan in October 1983.

== Shogi professional ==
Urano won his 400th game as a professional in February 2005.

In March 2017, Urano voluntarily declared himself as a free class player, thus leaving the Meijin tournament league. During the 75th Meijin Class C2 League season (April 2016–March 2017), Urano lost all ten of his games and received a demotion point as a result. This was a continuation of a series of poor results in Meijin Class League play—73rd Meijin Class C1 (1 win and 9 losses) and 74th Meijin Class C1 (2 wins and 8 losses)—and rather than risk automatic demotion to free class play, Urano decided to do so of his own accord.

=== Promotion history ===
The promotion history for Urano is as follows:

- 6-kyū: 1977
- 1-dan: 1980
- 4-dan: October 19, 1983
- 5-dan: April 1, 1987
- 6-dan: April 1, 1989
- 7-dan: April 1, 1996
- 8-dan: September 14, 2012

=== Awards and honors ===
In 2008, Urano received the Japan Shogi Association's "25 Years Service Award" for being an active professional for twenty-five years.

== Published works ==
Urano has authored several books and DVDs on shogi strategy and tsume shogi; some of these are as follows.

- Komatta Toki ni Yaku ni Tatsu Shōgi Kakugen Mame Jiten 困ったときに役に立つ将棋格言豆事典 [Handy Dictionary of Shogi Proverbs] (in Japanese). Tokyo, Japan: Mynavi Books. 2009. ISBN 978-4-8399-0189-9.
- Shodan ni Naru Tame no Shōgi Benkyōhō 初段になるための将棋勉強法 [How to Study Shogi to Become a 1-dan] (in Japanese). Tokyo, Japan: Byakuya Shobō. 2011. ISBN 978-4-8619-1699-1.
- Tsumi Tesuji DVD Bukku 詰手筋DVDブック [Tsumi Tetsuji DVD Book] (in Japanese). Tokyo, Japan: Rook Books. 2018. ISBN 978-4-9089-3701-9.
