= Aya Fujita =

Japanese professional shogi player

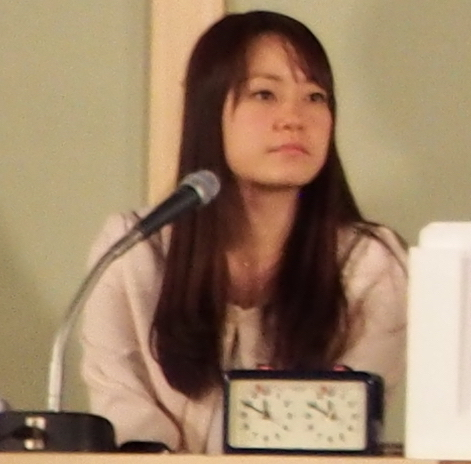
- Fujita in 2014
- Native name: 藤田 綾
- Born: March 24, 1987 (age 39)
- Hometown: Ōta, Tokyo

Career
- Achieved professional status: October 1, 1998 (aged 11)
- Badge number: W-23
- Rank: Women's 2-dan
- Teacher: Kazuyoshi Nishimura (9-dan)

Websites
- JSA profile page

Aya Fujita (藤田 綾, Fujita Aya; born March 24, 1987) is a Japanese women's professional shogi player ranked 2-dan. She holds the record for being the youngest person at age 11 years 6 months to have ever been awarded women's professional status by the Japan Shogi Association.

== Early life and apprenticeship ==
Fujita was born on March 24, 1987, in Ōta, Tokyo. She learned how to play shogi from her father as a young girl, but started to become really serious about the game as a second-grade elementary school student. Her father was fairly strict so she was not allowed to watch much television as a child, with the exception being when her family watched the recorded games from the NHK Cup TV Shogi Tournament together weekly. Most of her shogi studying involved solving tsume shogi problems and playing over professional game scores found in Japan Shogi Association (JSA) yearbooks and magazines, but occasionally she would go to play practice games at the shogi club located in the association's Tokyo head office.

Fujita entered the JSA's Women's Professional Apprentice League as a student of shogi professional Kazuyoshi Nishimura in April 1997 and finished second in the league's Class B division for the April – September 1997 season with a record of 14 wins and 4 losses to earn promotion to the Class A division. Fujita finished her first season in Class A (October 1997 – March 1998) with a record of 7 wins and 9 losses, but obtained women's professional status and promotion to the rank of women's professional 2-kyū after finishing first with a record of 12 wins a 2 losses in the league's Class A division for the April – September 1998 season. Fujita was 11 years 6 months old when she was promoted which made her the youngest person to ever be awarded women's professional status. (Note: The Japan Shogi Association (JSA) has separate systems for "regular" professionals (or Seiki Kishi) and women's professionals (or Joryū Kishi). No women has yet to qualify for "regular" professional status, and the youngest male to do so is Sōta Fujii. Fujii, however, was 13 years 2 months old when he obtained professional status, which makes Fujita the youngest person (male or female) to be awarded any type of professional status by the JSA.)

== Women's shogi professional ==
=== Promotion history ===
Fujita has been promoted as follows:

- 2-kyū: October 1, 1998
- 1-kyū: April 1, 2000
- 1-dan: April 1, 2001
- 2-dan: August 13, 2016

Note: All ranks are women's professional ranks.

== Personal life ==
The JSA posted on its official website on February 20, 2018, that Fujita had gotten married. The JSA also posted that Fujita would continue to compete under her maiden name.

In August 2018, the JSA announced that Fujita would be on maternity leave from August 11 until November 30, 2018. In November 2018, she announced on her official social media account that she had safely welcomed her first child.
