= Shinobu Iwane =

Japanese shogi player (born 1981)

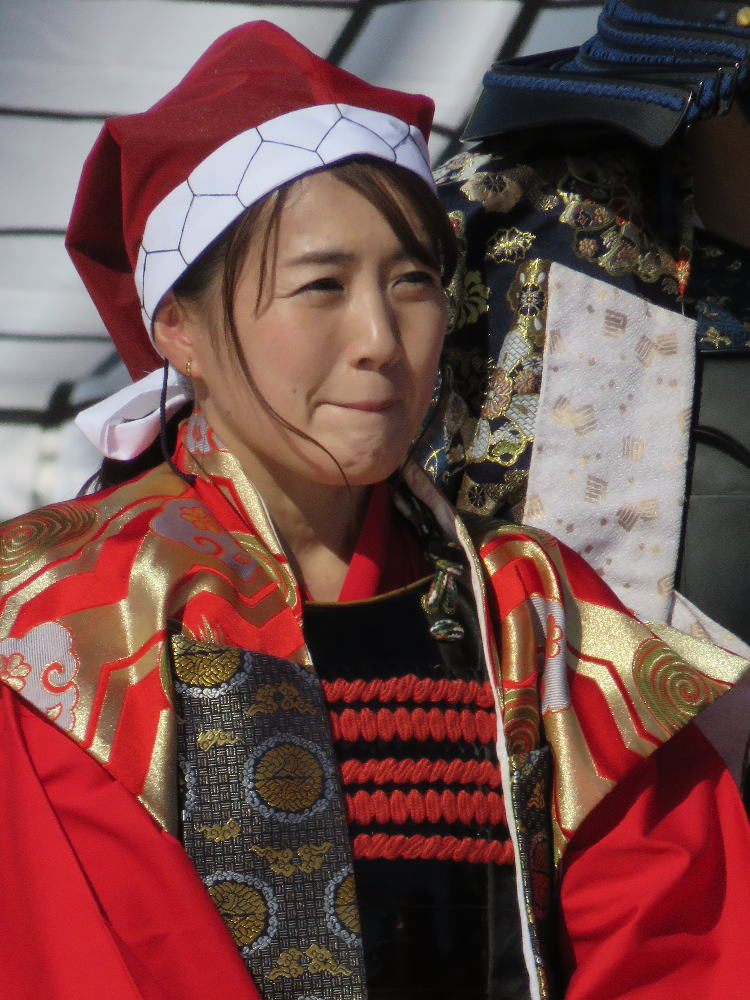
- Iwane at a 2018 Human Shogi event.
- Native name: 岩根忍
- Born: March 16, 1981 (age 44)
- Hometown: Osaka, Osaka Prefecture

Career
- Achieved professional status: April 1, 2004 (aged 23)
- Badge Number: W-32
- Rank: Women's 3-dan
- Teacher: Kenji Kobayashi (9-dan)

Websites
- JSA profile page

Shinobu Iwane (岩根 忍, Iwane Shinobu; born March 16, 1981) is a Japanese women's professional shogi player ranked 3-dan.

== Women's shogi professional ==
=== Promotion history ===
Iwane's promotion history is as follows.

- 1-kyū: April 1, 2004
- 1-dan: April 1, 2005
- 2-dan: March 9, 2009
- 3-dan: February 22, 2016

Note: All ranks are women's professional ranks.

=== Titles and other championships ===
Iwane has appeared in major title matches three times, but has yet to win a major title. She was the challenger for the 2nd MyNavi Women's Open Jo-Ō title in 2009, the 18th Kurashiki Tōka Cup title in 2010 and the 27th Women's Ōi title in 2016, but lost each time.

== Awards and honors ==
Iwane received the Japan Shogi Association's Annual Shogi Award for "Women's Professional Most Games Played" for the April 2009 – March 2010 shogi year.
