= Kenji Kanzaki =

Japanese shogi player

- Native name: 神崎健二
- Born: December 8, 1963 (age 61)
- Hometown: Wakayama
- Nationality: Japanese

Career
- Achieved professional status: November 5, 1986 (aged 22)
- Badge Number: 179
- Rank: 8-dan
- Teacher: Renshō Nada (9-dan)
- Meijin class: Free
- Ryūō class: 6

Websites
- JSA profile page

Kenji Kanzaki (神崎 健二, Kanzaki Kenji; December 8, 1963) is a Japanese professional shogi player ranked 8-dan.

== Shogi professional ==
In March 2018, Kanzaki finished the 76th Meijin Class C2 league (April 2017 – March 2018) with a record of 2 wins and 8 losses, earning a second consecutive demotion point which meant he was only one point away from automatic demotion to "Free Class" play. As a result, he declared his intention to the Japan Shogi Association to become a Free Class player as of April 2018 rather than risk automatic demotion.

On August 2, 2022, Kanzaki defeated Tomoki Yokoyama 4-dan in 64th Ōi tournament play to become the 58th shogi professional to win 600 games.

=== Promotion history ===
The promotion history for Kanzaki is as follows:

- 7-kyū: 1977
- 1-dan: 1980
- 4-dan: November 5, 1986
- 5-dan: April 24, 1990
- 6-dan: May 24, 1994
- 7-dan: May 29, 2001
- 8-dan: August 15, 2016

=== Awards and honors ===
Kanzaki received the JSA's "25 Years Service Award" in recognition of being an active professional for twenty-five years in 2011. In addition, he received the JSA's "Shogi Honor Award" in August 2022 for winning 600 games as a professional.
