= Sumie Ishitaka =

Japanese shogi player

- Native name: 石高澄恵
- Maiden name: Yokoyama (横山)
- Born: September 27, 1966 (age 58)
- Hometown: Esashi, Hokkaido

Career
- Achieved professional status: March 1, 1987 (aged 20)
- Badge Number: W-10
- Rank: Women's 2-dan
- Teacher: Katsumi Mushano (7-dan)

Websites
- JSA profile page

Sumie Ishitaka (石高 澄恵 Ishitaka Sumie, née Sumie Yokoyama 横山由紀, born September 27, 1966) is a Japanese women's professional shogi player ranked 2-dan.

== Women's professional shogi player ==
=== Promotion history ===
Ishitaka's promotion history is as follows.

- Women's Professional Apprentice League: 1985
- 3-kyū: March 1, 1987
- 1-kyū: March 1, 1989
- 1-dan: February 26, 1992
- 2-dan: April 1, 2000

Note: All ranks are women's professional ranks.

=== Awards and honors ===
Ishitaka received the Japan Shogi Association's received the "25 Years Service Award" in recognition of being an active professional for twenty-five years in 2011.

== Personal life ==
In April 2004, the JSA announced on it official website that Yokoyama had gotten married and had decided to complete professionally under her married name Ishitaka.
