= Satoru Sakaguchi =

Japanese shogi player

- Native name: 阪口悟
- Born: August 16, 1978 (age 47)
- Hometown: Takaishi, Osaka

Career
- Achieved professional status: October 1, 2004 (aged 26)
- Badge Number: 254
- Rank: 6-dan
- Teacher: Akira Kinoshita (7-dan)
- Meijin class: C2
- Ryūō class: 5

Websites
- JSA profile page

Satoru Sakaguchi (阪口 悟, Sakaguchi Satoru; born August 16, 1978) is a Japanese professional shogi player ranked 6-dan.

== Shogi professional ==
=== Promotion history ===
Sakaguchi's promotion history is as follows:

- 6-kyū: 1991
- 1-dan: 1996
- 4-dan: October 1, 2004
- 5-dan: December 8, 2009
- 6-dan: July 19, 2018
