= Sakiko Odaka =

Japanese shogi player

- Native name: 小高佐季子
- Born: June 4, 2002 (age 23)
- Hometown: Sakura, Chiba

Career
- Achieved professional status: February 7, 2018 (aged 15)
- Badge Number: W-61
- Rank: Women's 1-dan
- Teacher: Noboru Tamaru (9-dan)

Websites
- JSA profile page

Sakiko Odaka (小高 佐季子, Odaka Sakiko; born June 4, 2002) is a Japanese women's professional shogi player ranked 1-dan.

== Women's shogi professional ==
=== Promotion history ===
Odaka's promotion history is as follows:

- 3-kyū: June 20, 2017
- 2-kyū: February 7, 2018
- 1-kyū: October 14, 2019
- 1-dan: April 1, 2021

Note: All ranks are women's professional ranks.
