= Kumi Yamada =

Japanese shogi player (born 1967)

- Native name: 山田久美
- Born: January 6, 1967 (age 58)
- Hometown: Ōta, Gunma

Career
- Achieved professional status: April 20, 1982 (aged 15)
- Badge Number: W-6
- Rank: Women's 4-dan
- Teacher: Kazuyoshi Nishimura (9-dan)

Websites
- JSA profile page

Kumi Yamada (山田 久美, Yamada Kumi; born January 6, 1967) is a Japanese women's professional shogi player ranked 4-dan. She is the current president of the Ladies Professional Players Group.

== Women's shogi professional ==
=== Promotion history ===
Yamada's promotion history is as follows.

- 2-kyū: April 20, 1982
- 1-dan: April 1, 1983
- 2-dan: February 28, 1990
- 3-dan: April 1, 2000
- 4-dan: September 29, 2014

Note: All ranks are women's professional ranks.

=== Titles and other championships ===
Yamada has appeared in major titles match twice, but has yet to win a major title. She unsuccessfully challenged for the 12th Women's Ōshō title in 1989, the 22nd Kurashiki Tōka Cup title in 2014.

== Ladies Professional Players Group ==
Yamada was elected president of the Ladies Professional Players Group for the first time in June 2017, and re-elected to another two-year term in June 2019.
