= Eriko Yamaguchi =

Japanese shogi player

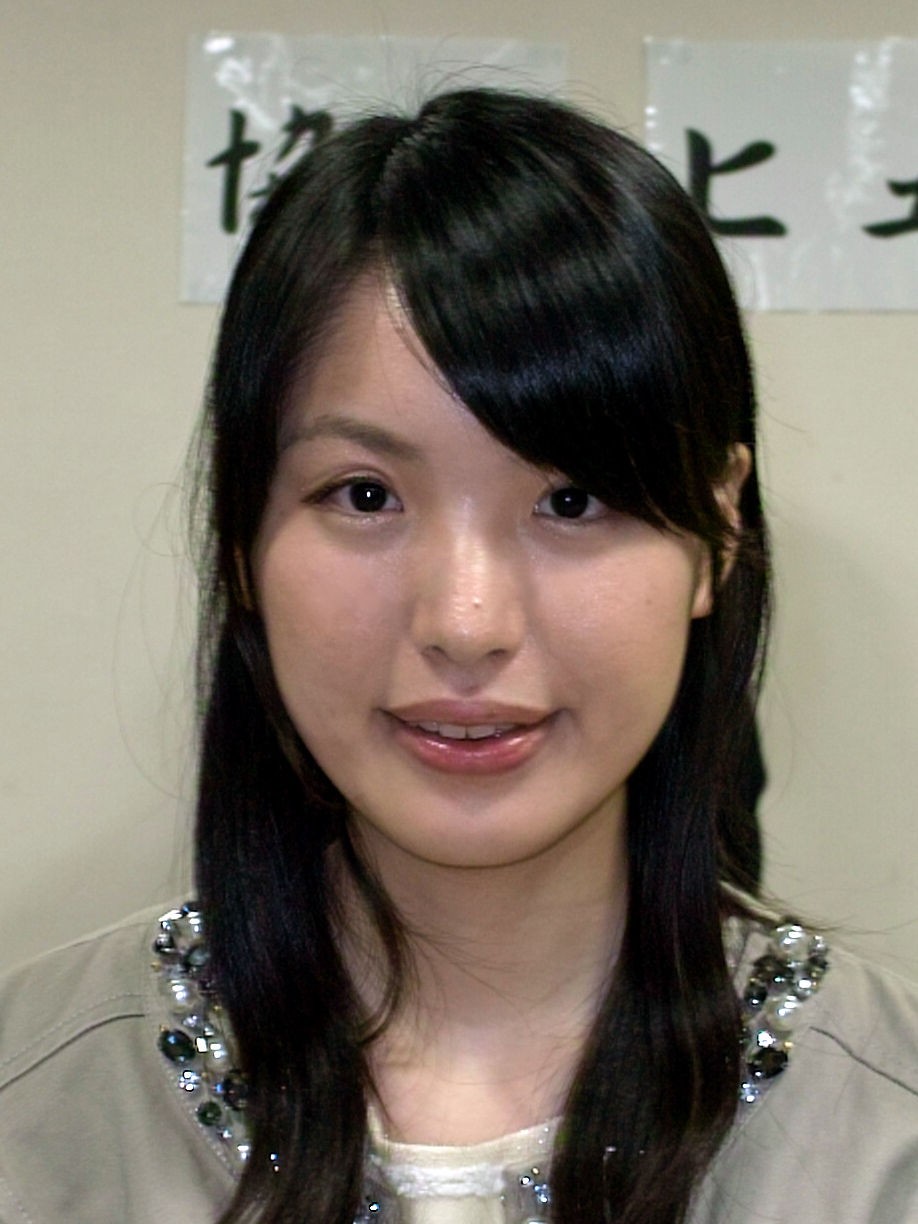
- Yamaguchi in October 2015.
- Native name: 山口恵梨子
- Born: October 12, 1991 (age 34)
- Hometown: Tottori Prefecture

Career
- Achieved professional status: April 1, 2008 (aged 16)
- Badge number: W-39
- Rank: Women's 3-dan
- Teacher: Kōji Horiguchi (7-dan)

Websites
- JSA profile page

Eriko Yamaguchi (山口 恵梨子, Yamaguchi Eriko; born October 12, 1991) is a Japanese women's professional shogi player ranked 3-dan.

== Women's shogi professional ==
=== Promotion history ===
The promotion history for Yamaguchi is given below.

- 2-kyū: April 1, 2008
- 1-kyū: March 25, 2009
- 1-dan: April 1, 2010
- 2-dan: May 25, 2016
- 3-dan: January 31, 2024

Note: All ranks are women's professional ranks.
