= Kenjirō Abe =

Japanese shogi player (born 1989)

- Native name: 阿部健治郎
- Born: February 25, 1989 (age 36)
- Hometown: Sakata, Yamagata

Career
- Achieved professional status: October 1, 2009 (aged 20)
- Badge Number: 277
- Rank: 7-dan
- Teacher: Kazuyoshi Nishimura (9-dan)
- Tournaments won: 1
- Meijin class: C1
- Ryūō class: 2

Websites
- JSA profile page
- Kenjirō Abe on Twitter

Kenjirō Abe (阿部 健治郎, Abe Kenjirō; born February 25, 1989) is a Japanese professional shogi player ranked 7-dan.

== Early life, amateur shogi and apprentice professional ==
Abe was born in Sakata, Yamagata on February 25, 1989. He learned how to play shogi when he was five years old from watching his father and older brother play each other. As a junior high school student, Abe finished runner-up in the Boy's Division of the 22nd All-Japan Junior High School Student Invitational Shogi Tournament in 2001 and later that same year entered the Japan Shogi Association's apprentice school at the rank of 6-kyū under the guidance of shogi professional Kazuyoshi Nishimura.

Abe obtained professional status and the rank of 4-dan on October 1, 2009, after finishing second the 45th 3-dan League (April 2009 – September 2009) with a record of 13 wins and 5 losses.

== Shogi professional ==
In October 2010. Abe won his first tournament since turning professional when he defeated amateur player Hakuyo Kaku (Note: Kaku is a former apprentice professional 3-dan who failed to obtain promotion to the full professional status and thus had to leave the apprentice school in 2008 at the age of 28.) 2 games to 1 to win the 41st Shinjin-Ō tournament.

=== Promotion history ===
Abe's promotion history is as follows:

- 6-kyū: September 25, 2002
- 4-dan: October 1, 2009
- 5-dan: November 1, 2011
- 6-dan: November 5, 2015
- 7-dan: April 22, 2016

=== Titles and other championships ===
Abe has yet to appear in a major title match, but he has won one non-major title championship.

=== Awards and honors ===
Abe received the Japan Shogi Association Annual Shogi Award for"Special Game of the Year" for the 2015 Shogi Year for his game against Yoshiharu Habu in the challenger tournament for the 41st Kiō title.
