= Hiromu Watanabe =

Japanese shogi player

- Native name: 渡辺大夢
- Born: July 29, 1988 (age 37)
- Hometown: Kōtō, Japan

Career
- Achieved professional status: October 1, 2012 (aged 24)
- Badge Number: 290
- Rank: 6-dan
- Teacher: Kazuo Ishida (9-dan)
- Meijin class: C2
- Ryūō class: 4

Websites
- JSA profile page

Hiromu Watanabe (渡辺 大夢, Watanabe Hiromu; born July 29, 1988) is a Japanese professional shogi player ranked 6-dan.

== Early life and apprenticeship ==
Watanabe was born in Kōtō, Japan on July 29, 1988. He learned how to play shogi when he was about five years old from his grandfather, and subsequently entered the Japan Shogi Association's apprentice school at the rank of 6-kyū as a student of shogi professional Kazuo Ishida in 2001.

Watanabe was promoted to the rank of 1-dan in 2004, and 3-dan in 2006. He obtained full professional status and the rank of 4-dan in October 2012 after finishing the 51st 3-dan League (April 2012 – September 2012) with a record of 13 wins and 5 losses. Although Watanabe's record actually placed him in a tie for second-place overall, his lower league seed meant he did not earn automatic promotion to the rank of 4-dan; his performance, however, was good enough to earn him a second promotion point, thus giving him the option to enter the professional ranks as a free class player, which he elected to do.

== Shogi professional ==
=== Promotion history ===
The promotion history for Watanabe is as follows.

- 6-kyū: September 2001
- 1-dan: October 2006
- 4-dan: October 1, 2012
- 5-dan: October 27, 2016
- 6-dan: October 21, 2021
