= Yūsuke Tōyama =

Japanese shogi player

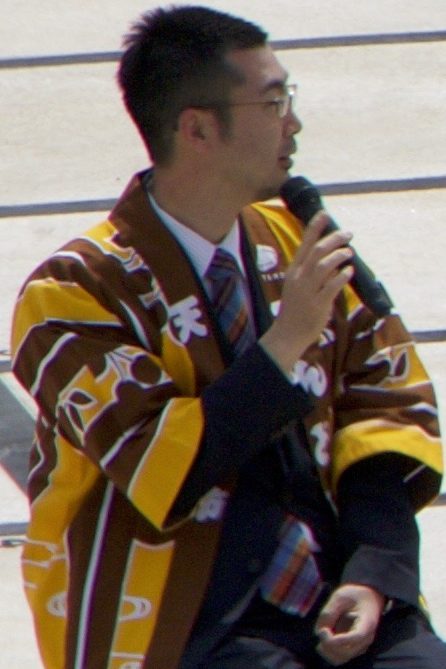
- Native name: 遠山雄亮
- Born: December 10, 1979 (age 45)
- Hometown: Nerima, Japan

Career
- Achieved professional status: October 1, 2005 (aged 25)
- Badge Number: 258
- Rank: 6-dan
- Teacher: Jun'ichi Kase (7-dan)
- Meijin class: C2
- Ryūō class: 5

Websites
- JSA profile page
- Official website

Yūsuke Tōyama (遠山 雄亮, Tōyama Yūsuke; born December 10, 1979) is a Japanese professional shogi player ranked 6-dan.

== Early life, education and apprenticeship ==
Tōyama was born on December 10, 1979, in Nerima, Japan. He entered the Japan Shogi Association's apprentice school at the rank of 6-kyū under the tutelage of shogi professional Jun'ichi Kase in 2005.

Tōyama was promoted to the rank of 1-dan in August 1997 and obtained full professional status and the rank of 4-dan after finishing tied for first with Issei Takazaki in the 37th 3-dan league (April 2005 – September 2005) with a record of 13 wins and 5 losses.

== Shogi professional ==
=== Promotion history ===
Tōyama's promotion history is as follows:

- 6-kyū: 1993
- 1-dan: 1997
- 4-dan: October 1, 2005
- 5-dan: February 22, 2011
- 6-dan: February 23, 2018

== Personal life ==
Tōyama is a graduate of Seikei University. He was a member of the school's tennis team.
