= Keita Kadokura =

Japanese shogi player

- Native name: 門倉啓太
- Born: June 3, 1987 (age 38)
- Hometown: Toshima, Tokyo

Career
- Achieved professional status: April 1, 2011 (aged 23)
- Badge Number: 282
- Rank: 6-dan
- Teacher: Kazuo Ishida (9-dan)
- Tournaments won: 1
- Meijin class: C1
- Ryūō class: 5

Websites
- JSA profile page

Keita Kadokura (門倉 啓太, Kadokura Keita; born June 3, 1987) is a Japanese professional shogi player ranked 6-dan.

== Early life and apprenticeship ==
Kadokura was born in Toshima, Tokyo on June 3, 1987. He learned shogi when he was a third-grade elementary school student from an acquaintance who was a strong amateur player.

Kadokura entered the Japan Shogi Association's apprentice school as a student of shogi professional Kazuo Ishida at the rank of 5-kyū in 2000. He was promoted to 1-dan in 2003 and 3-dan in 2005. It took him eleven seasons of 3-dan League play before he obtained full professional status and the rank of 4-dan after tying for first place in the 48th 3-dan League (October 2010 – March 2011) in 2011 with a record of 13 wins and 5 losses.

== Shogi professional ==
In August 2019, Kadokura defeated Junpei Ide to win the 4th Yamada Challenge Cup. It was Kadokura's first tournament championship as a professional.

=== Promotion history ===
Kadokura's promotion history is as follows:

- 6-kyū: September 2000
- 3-dan: October 2005
- 4-dan: April 1, 2011
- 5-dan: November 17, 2016
- 6-dan: September 25, 2024
