= Shingo Sawada =

Japanese shogi player (born 1991)

- Native name: 澤田真吾
- Born: November 21, 1991 (age 33)
- Hometown: Suzuka, Mie

Career
- Achieved professional status: April 1, 2009 (aged 17)
- Badge Number: 274
- Rank: 6-dan
- Teacher: Nobuo Mori (7-dan)
- Meijin class: B1
- Ryūō class: 2
- Notable students: Riko Morimoto

Websites
- JSA profile page

Shingo Sawada (澤田 真吾, Sawada Shingo; born November 21, 1991) is a Japanese professional shogi player ranked 7-dan.

== Early life, amateur shogi and apprenticeship ==
Shingo Sawada was born on November 21, 1991, in Suzuka, Mie. He finished in third place in the 26th (2001) and 27th (2002) Elementary School Student Meijin Tournaments as the representative of Mie Prefecture.

Sawada entered the Japan Shogi Association's apprentice school at the rank of 6-kyū as a protegee of shogi professional Nobuo Mori in March 2004 and was promoted to the rank of 1-dan in December 2007. Sawada was promoted to 3-dan in April 2008 and finished the 43rd 3-dan League (April 2008 – September 2008) with a record of 8 wins and 10 losses. He obtained full professional status and the rank of 4-dan in April 2009 after winning the 44th 3-dan League (October 2008 – March 2009) with a record of 14 wins and 4 losses.

== Shogi professional ==
=== Promotion history ===
The promotion history for Sawada is as follows:

- 6-kyū: March 23, 2004
- 4-dan: April 1, 2009
- 5-dan: February 12, 2013
- 6-dan: November 6, 2014
- 7-dan: October 14, 2020

=== Awards and honors ===
Sawada received the Japan Shogi Association's Annual Shogi Award for "Most Consecutive Games Won" for the 2020–2021 shogi year.
