= Haruka Aikawa =

Japanese shogi player (born 1994)

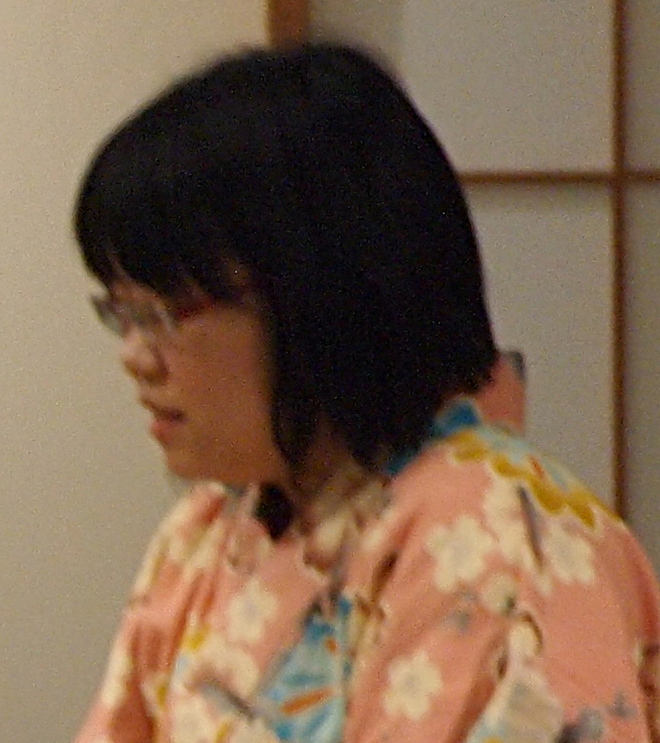
- Aikawa in 2013.
- Native name: 相川春香
- Born: April 18, 1994 (age 31)
- Hometown: Suginami, Tokyo

Career
- Achieved professional status: August 17, 2013 (aged 19)
- Badge Number: W-47
- Rank: Women's 1-dan
- Teacher: Terutaka Yasue (8-dan)

Websites
- JSA profile page

Haruka Aikawa (相川 春香, Aikawa Haruka; born April 18, 1994) is a Japanese women's professional shogi player ranked 1-dan.

== Early life, amateur shogi and training group student ==
Aikawa was born in Suginami, Tokyo on April 18, 1994. She learned how to play shogi from her father when she was about seven years old.

In August 2007, she finished runner up in the girl's division of the 28th All Japan Junior High School Student Invitational Shogi Tournament as a junior high school student, and was honored by the Suginami City Board of Education as a result.

In the Fall of 2008, Ailkawa entered the Women's Apprentice Professional League under the guidance of shogi professional Terutaka Yasue, but was moved to Training Group Class D2 in April 2009 after the JSA ended the Women's Apprentice Professional League system at the end of March 2009. Aikawa was promoted to training group Class C1 in May June 2011, which earned her the right to request to be promoted to the women's provisional shogi player status and the rank of 3-kyū. Aikawa submitted her request to the JSA, which announced in August that and she was to be officially awarded the rank and provisional women's professional status on October 1, 2011.

== Women's shogi professional ==
=== Promotion history ===
Aikawa's promotion history is as follows:

- 3-kyū: October 1, 2011
- 2-kyū: August 17, 2013
- 1-kyū: February 24, 2015
- 1-dan: April 1, 2015

Note: All ranks are women's professional ranks.
