= Kei Katō =

Japanese shogi player

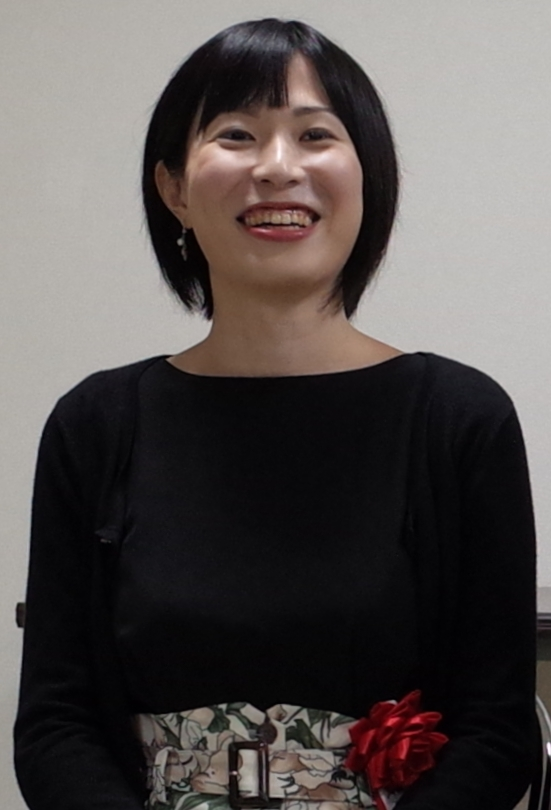
- Katō at a shogi festival in October 2019
- Native name: 加藤圭
- Born: August 18, 1991 (age 34)
- Hometown: Hitachi, Ibaraki

Career
- Achieved professional status: June 21, 2018 (aged 26)
- Badge Number: W-64
- Rank: Women's 2-dan
- Teacher: Jun'ichi Kase (7-dan)

Websites
- JSA profile page

Kei Katō (加藤 圭, Katō Kei; born August 18, 1991) is a Japanese women's professional shogi player ranked 2-dan.

== Women's shogi professional ==
=== Promotion history ===
Katō's promotion history is as follows:

- 3-kyū: February 1, 2018
- 2-kyū: June 21. 2018
- 1-kyū: October 1, 2019
- 1-dan: March 16, 2020
- 2-dan: April 2, 2021

Note: All ranks are women's professional ranks.
