= Ichirō Hiura =

Japanese shogi player

- Native name: 日浦市郎
- Born: March 4, 1966 (age 60)
- Hometown: Shinhidaka, Hokkaido, Japan

Career
- Achieved professional status: April 4, 1984 (aged 13)
- Badge number: 164
- Rank: 8-dan
- Teacher: Terutaka Yasue (8-dan)
- Tournaments won: 1
- Meijin class: C2
- Ryūō class: 6

Websites
- JSA profile page

Ichirō Hiura (日浦 市郎, Hiura Ichirō; born March 4, 1966) is a Japanese professional shogi player ranked 8-dan.

== Shogi professional ==
Hiura's only championship as a professional came in 1989 when he defeated Daisuke Nakagawa to 2 games to none to win the 20th Shinjin-Ō tournament.

In October 2012, he became the 45th shogi professional to win 600 official games when he defeated Shin'ya Satō in a 54th Ōi tournament preliminary round game.

=== Forfeit losses and suspension for non-compliance with mask rules ===
In January 2023, Hiura became the second shogi professional—the first was Amahiko Satō in October 2022—to be disqualified during an official game for non-compliance with the JSA's rules regarding the wearing of face masks. In February 2022, the JSA instituted new provisional rules for official game play that had previously only been recommended practices in response to the COVID-19 pandemic in Japan. These rules required players to properly wear a face mask during official games, except when eating, drinking or other instances where masks may be allowed to be removed for short-periods of time. On January 11, 2023, Hiura was disqualified during his Meijin Class C1 ranking league game against Shingo Hirafuji for failing to cover his nose with his mask as required by JSA rules. Hirafuji asked the game's referee Hiroshi Kobayashi to request Hiura to comply and cover his nose, but Hiura refused. After discussing matters with JSA directors, Kobayashi notified Hiura that any continued non-compliance would result in a loss by disqualification. When Hiura still refused to cover his nose, the game was declared a win for Hirafuji.

Hiura's next two official games—February 1 against Tatsuya Sanmaidō and February 7 against Akihiro Murata—also resulted in losses by forfeit since he continued to not comply JSA's rules and cover his nose with his mask. Prior to his February 7 game, Hiura was informed in writing and in person that he was required to comply with the mask rules and a failure to do so could lead to formal action being taken against him, and he was further warned several times during the game before it was declared a forfeit loss. In response, the JSA announced that it would convene its player conduct committee to consider what further type of action to take.

On February 13, 2023, the JSA posted on its official website that Hiura was being suspended from official games for a three-month period starting that same day and lasting until May 12, 2023. The JSA stated that its player conduct committee had met with Hiura on February 8 to hear his reasons for not properly wearing a mask and decide whether disciplinary action needed to be taken. The committee submitted its report at a special session of the JSA Board of Directors held on February 10 and made its recommendation. The board of directors accepted the committee's findings and voted to suspended Hiura from official play for three months starting on February 13.

== Promotion history ==
Hiura's promotion history is as follows:

- 6-kyū: 1980
- 1-dan: 1982
- 4-dan: April 4, 1984
- 5-dan: June 22, 1988
- 6-dan: January 27, 1993
- 7-dan: October 5, 1999
- 8-dan: April 16, 2010

== Titles and other championships ==
Hiura has yet to appear in a major title match, but he has won one non-major title championship.

== Awards and honors ==
Hiura received the Japan Shogi Association's "25 Years Service Award" in 2009 in recognition of being an active professional for twenty-five years, and the "Shogi Honor Award" in 2012 in recognition of winning 600 official games as a professional.
