= Mihoko Iwasa =

Japanese shogi player (born 2005)

- Native name: 岩佐 美帆子
- Born: August 15, 2005 (age 19)
- Hometown: Gifu, Japan

Career
- Achieved professional status: February 1, 2022 (aged 16)
- Badge Number: W-76
- Rank: Women's 1-kyū
- Teacher: Masayuki Toyoshima (9-dan)

Websites
- JSA profile page

Mihoko Iwasa (岩佐 美帆子, Iwasa Mihoko; born August 15, 2005) is a Japanese women's professional shogi player ranked 1-kyū.

== Early life and training group player ==
Iwasa was born in Gifu, Japan on August 15, 2005. She learned how to play shogi as a fourth-grade student due the influence of her older brothers. She subsequently began attending a local shogi school and had become good enough to enter the Tōkai branch of the Japan Shogi Association's training group system as a fifth-grade elementary school student.

Iwasa qualified for women's professional status after being promoted to training group B2 in December 2021. Needing a sponsor to become a women's professional, her first choice was shogi professional Masayuki Toyoshima. A meeting between the two was arranged by a mutual acquaintance and Toyoshima agreed to take her on as his first apprentice. She applied for women's professional status and her application was accepted by the Japan Shogi Association; she was granted women's professional status on February 1, 2022. As of February 2022, she is a senior high school student and Uguisudani Junior and Senior High School in Gifu.

== Women's shogi professional ==
=== Promotion history ===
Iwasa's promotion history is as follows.

- 2-kyū: February 1, 2022
- 1-kyū: April 1, 2023

Note: All ranks are women's professional ranks.
