= Ayano Hori =

Japanese Shogi player

- Native name: 堀彩乃
- Born: May 28, 1993 (age 32)
- Hometown: Kōchi Prefecture

Career
- Achieved professional status: March 13, 2017 (aged 23)
- Badge Number: LPSA W-20
- Rank: Women's 1-dan
- Teacher: Keiji Mori (9-dan)

Websites
- LPSA profile page

Ayano Hori (堀 彩乃, Hori Ayano; born May 28, 1993) is a Japanese women's professional shogi player ranked 1-dan. She is a member of the Ladies Professional Shogi-players' Association of Japan.

== Women's shogi professional ==
=== Promotion history ===
Hori has been promoted as follows:

- 3-kyū: August 2016
- 2-kyū: March 1, 2017
- 1-kyū: October 1, 2019
- 1-dan: April 1, 2024

Note: All ranks are women's professional ranks.
