= Rei Takedomi =

Japanese professional shogi player

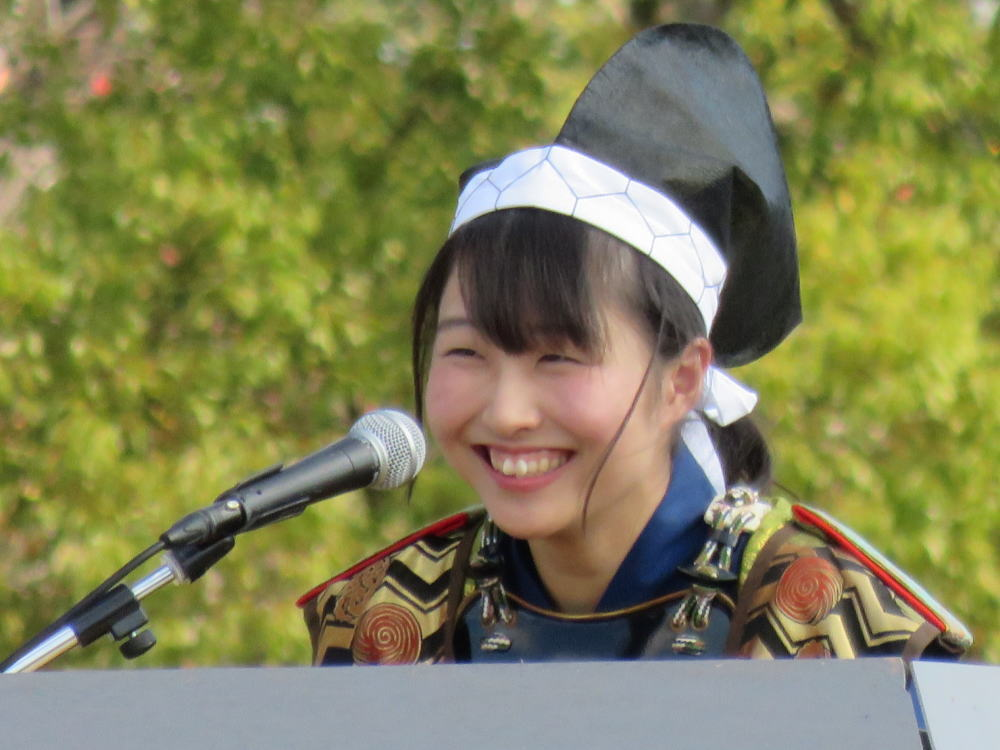
- Takedomi at a 2018 Human Shogi event.
- Native name: 武富礼衣
- Born: May 25, 1999 (age 26)
- Hometown: Saga, Japan

Career
- Achieved professional status: February 7, 2018 (aged 18)
- Badge Number: W-60
- Rank: Women's 2-dan
- Teacher: Isao Nakata (8-dan)

Websites
- JSA profile page

Rei Takedomi (武富 礼衣, Takedomi Rei; born May 25, 1999) is a Japanese women's professional shogi player ranked 2-dan.

== Women's shogi professional ==
Takedomi is the first woman's professional from Saga Prefecture.

=== Promotion history ===
Takedomi's promotion history is as follows:

- 3-kyū: May 25, 2016
- 2-kyū: February 7, 2018
- 1-dan: March 9, 2018
- 2-dan: May 8, 2025

Note: All ranks are women's professional ranks.
