= Junpei Ide =

Japanese Shogi player

- Native name: 井出隼平
- Born: May 3, 1991 (age 34)
- Hometown: Yokohama, Japan

Career
- Achieved professional status: April 1, 2016 (aged 24)
- Badge Number: 305
- Rank: 5-dan
- Teacher: Noboru Tamaru (9-dan)
- Tournaments won: 1
- Meijin class: C2
- Ryūō class: 5

Websites
- JSA profile page

Junpei Ide (井出 隼平, Ide Junpei; born May 3, 1991) is a Japanese professional shogi player ranked 5-dan.

== Shogi professional ==
In October 2016, Ide defeated apprentice professional 3-dan Yūta Ishikawa 2 games to 1 to win the 6th Kakogawa Seiryū Tournament. Ide made it to the championship match of the same tournament the following year, but lost the 7th Kakogawa Seiryū Tournament to Takuya Nishida 2 games to 1.

=== Promotion history ===
Ide's promotion history is as follows:

- 6-kyū: September 2003
- 3-dan: October 2009
- 4-dan: April 1, 2016
- 5-dan: February 25, 2021

=== Titles and other championships ===
Ide has yet to appear in a major title match, but he has won one non-major title championship.
