= Mana Watanabe =

Japanese shogi player (born 1993)

- Native name: 渡部愛
- Born: June 26, 1993 (age 33)
- Hometown: Obihiro, Hokkaido

Career
- Achieved professional status: October 24, 2013 (aged 20)
- Badge number: LPSA-19
- Rank: Women's 3-dan
- Major titles won: 1
- Tournaments won: 2

Websites
- LPSA profile page

Mana Watanabe (渡部 愛, Watanabe Mana; born June 26, 1993) is a Japanese women's professional shogi player ranked 3-dan. She is a former Women's Ōi title holder. She is also the first women's professional to come out of the Ladies Professional Shogi-players' Association of Japan (LSPA) and subsequently be recognized as such by the Japan Shogi Association.

== Women's shogi professional ==
Watanabe's first appearance in a women's professional major title match came in May–June 2018 when she challenged Kana Satomi for 29th Women's Ōi title, and she won the match 3 games to 1. The two met again the following year in the 30th Women's Ōi title match (May–June 2019); Watanabe was, however, unable to successfully defend her title, losing 3 games to 1.

Watanabe met Tomoka Nishiyama in the title match of the 1st Hakurei tournament in September–October 2021, but lost the match 4 games to none.

Watanabe challenged Kana Fukuma (née Satomi) for the latter's Seirei title in July–August 2025, but lost 7th Seirei Title Match 3 games to none.

=== Promotion history ===
Watanabe has been promoted as follows.

- 3-kyū: July 3, 2012
- 2-kyū: October 2013
- 1-kyū: March 2014
- 1-dan: March 2014
- 2-dan: November 2017
- 3-dan: June 2018

Note: All ranks are women's professional ranks.

=== Major titles and other championships ===
Watanabe has appeared in major title matches four times and has won one major title. She has also won two other official women's professional shogi tournaments.

=== Awards and honors ===
Watanabe received the Japan Shogi Association's "Women's Professional Award", "Women's Professional Game of the Year", "Game of the Year Special Prize" Annual Shogi Awards for the April 2018 – March 2019 shogi year.

In addition, to Annual Shogi Awards, Watanabe received Ōta, Tokyo's "Meritorious Resident Award" in 2019.

== Personal life ==
Watanabe is married to shogi professional Hirotaka Nozuki. The two got married in January 2024. Watanabe stated that she will continue to complete professionally under her maiden name.

The LPSA posted on its official website on March 30, 2026, that Watanabe would be taking a leave of absence from May 11 to July 31, 2026, due to childbirth.
