= Momoko Katō =

Japanese shogi player (born 1993)

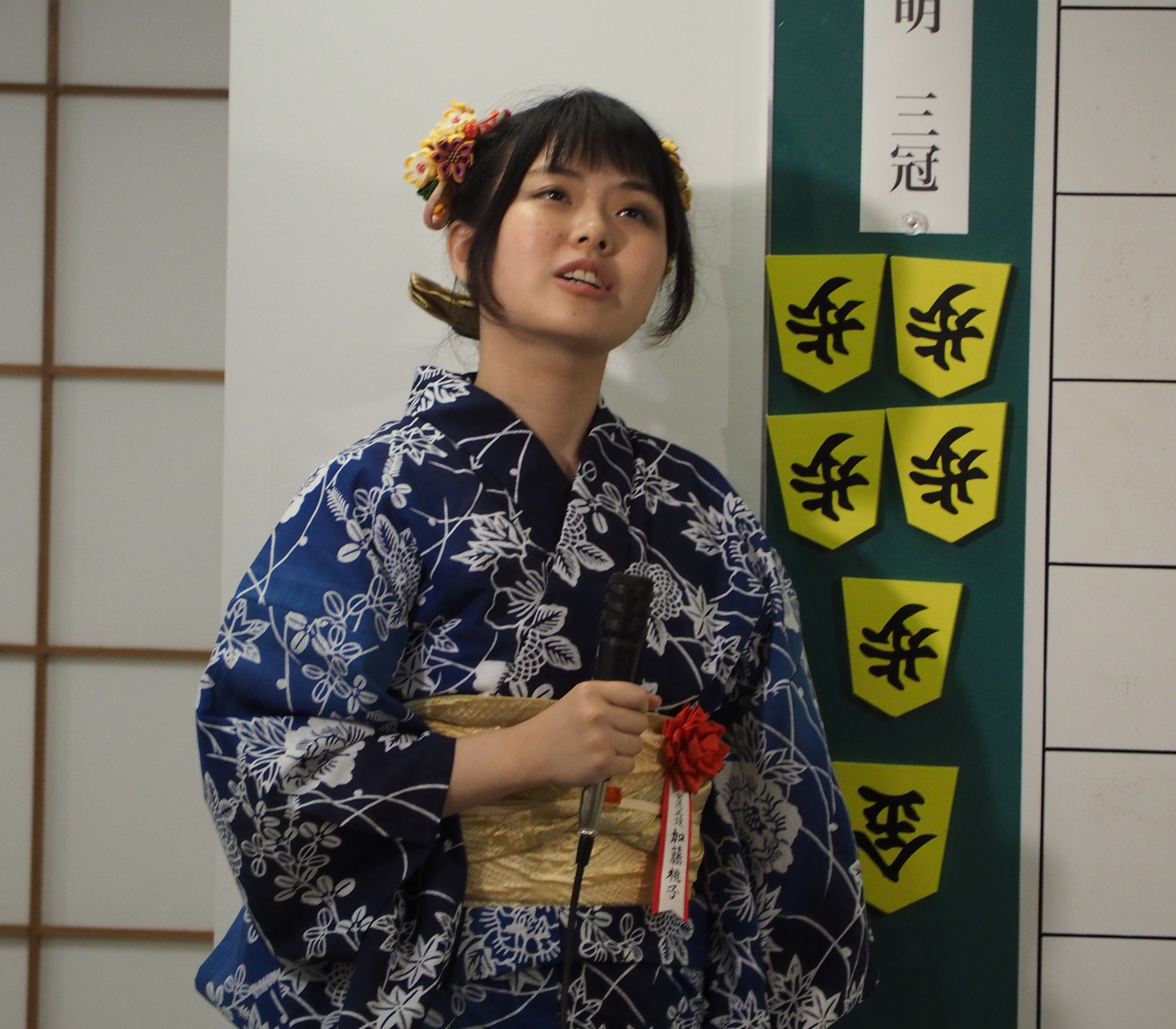
- Katō at an event in 2019.
- Native name: 加藤 桃子
- Born: October 6, 1993 (age 31)
- Hometown: Makinohara, Shizuoka Prefecture

Career
- Achieved professional status: April 1, 2019 (aged 25)
- Badge Number: W-67
- Rank: Women's 4-dan
- Teacher: Terutaka Yasue (8-dan)
- Major titles won: 9

Websites
- JSA profile page

Momoko Katō (加藤 桃子, Katō Momoko; born October 6, 1993) is a Japanese women's professional shogi player ranked 4-dan. She is a former holder of the Seirei, Women's Ōza and Jo-Ō titles.

== Early life and amateur shogi ==
Katō was born in Makinohara, Shizuoka Prefecture on October 6, 1993. She started playing shogi when she was about five years old. She started taking shogi lessons and was traveling outside of Shizuoka Prefecture to play in shogi tournaments by the time she was a third-grade elementary school student, and won a national shogi championship when she was a fifth-grade elementary school student.

== Apprentice shogi professional ==
Katō entered the Japan Shogi Association's apprentice school at the rank of 6-kyū as a student of shogi professional Terutaka Yasue in 2006 when she was eleven years old. She was promoted to the rank of apprentice professional 1-kyū in 2011 and then apprentice professional 1-dan in May 2014, becoming just the third woman to achieve that rank after Kana Satomi and Tomoka Nishiyama.

In March 2019, Katō decided to leave the apprentice school and petitioned the JSA to become a women's professional shogi player instead. In consideration of her past success in women's professional shogi tournaments, the JSA decided to award Katō the rank of 3-dan instead of her last rank as an apprentice professional which is the common practice for women apprentice professionals ranked 2-kyū or higher.

== Women's shogi professional ==
In November 2021, Katō won the 3rd Seirei title (September–November 2021) by defeating the defending champion Kana Satomi 3 games to 2. Katō, however, was unable to successfully defend her Seirei title the following year, losing a rematch against Satomi 3 games to none in the 4th Seirei Title Match (July–August 2022). The pair faced each other again in major title match later in 2022 when Katō challenged Satomi for the 12th Women's Ōza title (October– December 2022). Satomi successfully defended her Women's Ōza title 3 games to 2.

Katō advanced to Women's Ōza title match against Satomi for the second year in a row, but once again was unsuccessful, losing the 13th Women's Ōza title match 3 games to 1.

In April–May 2024, Katō challenged Satomi (now playing under her married name "Fukuma") for the Women's Ōi title, but lost the 35th Women's Ōi Title Match 3 games to 0. Katō and Fukuma met again a few months later in the 6th Seirei title match (July–August 2024), but Fukuma won the match 3 games to 1.

=== Promotion history ===
Katō's promotion history is as follows.

- 3-dan: April 1, 2019
- 4-dan: July 3, 2023

Note: All ranks are women's professional ranks.

=== Major titles ===
Katō has appeared in women's major title matches twenty-three times and has won a total of nine titles. She has won the Women's Ōza and the Jo-Ō titles four times each, and the Seirei title once.

=== Awards and honors ===
Katō has received the following JSA Annual Shogi Awards.

- 48th Annual Awards (April 2020 – March 2021): Women's Professional Most Games Played
- 50th Annual Shogi Awards (April 2022 – March 2023): Women's Professional Game of the Year
- 51st Annual Shogi Awards (April 2023 – March 2024): Women's Professional Most Games Played
- 52nd Annual Shogi Awards (April 2024 – March 2025): Women's Professional Most Games Played
