= Masayuki Toyoshima =

Japanese shogi player (born 1990)

- Born: April 30, 1990 (age 36)
- Hometown: Ichinomiya, Aichi

Career
- Achieved professional status: April 1, 2007 (aged 16)
- Badge number: 264
- Rank: 9-dan
- Teacher: Kiyozumi Kiriyama (9-dan)
- Major titles won: 6
- Tournaments won: 6
- Meijin class: A
- Ryūō class: 2
- Notable students: Mihoko Iwasa

Websites
- JSA profile page

Masayuki Toyoshima (豊島 将之, Toyoshima Masayuki; born April 30, 1990) is a Japanese professional shogi player, ranked 9-dan. He is a former holder of the Ryūō, Meijin, Ōi, Kisei and Eiō titles.

== Early life and apprenticeship ==
Toyoshima was born in Ichinomiya, Aichi, on April 30, 1990. He entered the Japan Shogi Association's apprentice school at the rank of 6-kyū under the guidance of shogi professional Kiyozumi Kiriyama in 1999. He obtained professional status and the rank of 4-dan on April 1, 2007, after finishing tied for first with Kōta Kanai in the 40th 3-dan League (October 2006 – March 2007) with a record of 14 wins and 4 losses.

== Shogi professional ==
Toyoshima, together with Akira Inaba, Tetsurō Itodani and Akihiro Murata, is one of four Kansai-based young shogi professionals who are collectively referred to as the Big Young Kansai Four (関西若手四天王, Kansai Wakate Shitennō).

Toyoshima's first appearance in a major title match came in 2010 when he defeated Yasumitsu Satō to win the 60th Ōshō league with a record of 5 wins and 1 loss, Although Toyoshima lost his first game in league play, he proceeded to win his next five to earn the right to challenge defending Ōshō Toshiaki Kubo for his title. The match against Kubo was tied at one win apiece after two games, but Kubo won three out of the next four games to defend his title 4–2. Toyoshima was 20-years-old at the time which made him the youngest challenger in the tournament's history, breaking the record set by Hifumi Katō who was 22-years-old when he challenged for the title in 1961.

In July 2014, Toyoshima defeated Tadahisa Maruyama to win the right to challenge Yoshiharu Habu for the 62nd Ōza title. Although Toyoshima lost the first two games of his match against Habu, he won the next two to tie the match before losing the deciding Game 5.

In April 2015, Toyoshima defeated Meijin title holder Amahiko Satō to advance to the 86th Kisei title match, but lost to Habu 3 games to 1.

Toyoshima defeated Amahiko Satō to win the 37th Nihon Series JT Professional Tournament on October 23, 2016, for his first tournament victory as a professional. He reached the finals of the tournament once again in 2017, but lost to Takayuki Yamasaki.

Two days after his loss to Yamazaki, Toyoshima defeated Kōichi Fukaura on November 21, 2017, to win the 67th Ōshō league with a record of 5 wins and 1 loss and earn the right to challenge Kubo once again for the Ōshō title. Like their first meeting back in 2010, the players were tied at one win each after two games, but Kubo went on to win the match once again 4 games to 2.

On July 17, 2018, Toyoshima defeated Habu in Game 5 of the 89th Kisei match to capture his first major title. His victory meant that for the first time since 1987 (when there were only seven major titles) no player held more than one major title. The period of "no multiple titleholders", however, was ended by Toyoshima himself in September 2018 when he defeated Tatsuya Sugai 4 games to 3 to capture the 59th Ōi title and become a 2-crown title holder.

In March 2019, Toyoshima won the 77th Meijin Class A ranking league with a record of 8 wins and 1 loss to earn the right to challenge reigning Meijin Amahiko Satō for the 77th Meijin title. It was the first time Toyoshima earned the right to challenge for the Meijin title. In the April–May title match, Toyoshima defeated Satō 4 games to none. Toyoshima's victory made him a 3-crown title holder, and also made him the first shogi professional born in the Heisei Era to win the Meijin title. Capturing the Meijin title also meant the Toyoshima met the criteria for promotion to the rank of 9-dan and he was awarded the rank by the JSA later the same day.

Toyoshima's first title defense came in June–July 2019 when he faced challenger Akira Watanabe in the 90th Kisei title match. Toyoshima won the first game of the match, but Watanabe won the next three games to capture the title. With the loss, Toyoshima returned to being a 2-crown title holder.

Toyoshima defended his Ōi title against Kazuki Kimura in the 60th Ōi title match (July 7–September 26, 2019). Toyoshima won the first two games, but proceeded to lose the next two. Toyoshima won Game 5 and needed just one more win to defend his title, but Kimura won the last two games to win the match 4 games to 3.

In September 2019, Toyoshima and Kimura met again the 32nd Ryūō Challenger Playoff Match to earn the right to challenge defending Ryūō Akihito Hirose for the 32nd Ryūō title. Toyoshima won the match 2 games to 1 and became a challenger for the Ryūō title for the first time. In the October–December title match against Hirose, Toyoshima won the first three games and ended up winning the match 4 games to 1. The victory not only returned Toyoshima to 2-crown title holder status and gave him his first Ryūō title, but it also made him only the fourth professional shogi player to hold the Ryūō and Meijin titles at the same time.

Toyoshima defeated Watanabe in the championship game of the 27th Ginga Tournament on September 24, 2019, to win the tournament for the first time.

In June–August 2020, Toyoshima was unable to defend his Meijin title, losing the 78th Meijin title match to Watanabe 4 games to 2.

Toyoshima captured the 5th Eiō title on September 21, 2020, when he defeated the defending Eiō title holder Takuya Nagase 4 games to 3. The two players actually needed nine games to determine the best-of-seven match because two of the games ended in impasse.

Toyoshima and Nagase faced each other again in the finals of the 41st Nihon Series JT Professional Tournament in November 2020; Toyoshima defeated Nagase to win the tournament for the second time.

Toyoshima successfully defended his Ryūō title in December 2020 by winning the 33rd Ryūō title match (October–December 2020) against Habu 4 games to 1.

In 2021, Toyoshima faced Sōta Fujii in three major title matches and in the final of one non-major title tournament. Toyoshima challenged Fujii for the latter's Ōi title in June–August 2021, but lost the 62nd Ōi title match 4 games to 1. At roughly the same time, Toyoshima and Fujii also met in the 6th Eiō title match (July–September 2021), with the challenger Fujii winning 3 games to 2. The pair met again when Fujii challenged Toyoshima for the Ryūō title in 34th Ryūō title match held in October–November 2021. Fujii won the match 4 games to none to drop Toyoshima from the ranks of current major title holders. Toyoshima and Fujii met about a week after the conclusion of the 34th Ryūō in the championship game of the 42nd Nihon Series JT Professional Tournament: Toyoshima defeated Fujii to repeat as champion and win the tournament for the third time overall.

Toyoshima defeated Ayumu Matsuo in March 2022 to win the 71st NHK Cup. It was the first time Toyoshima won the tournament. In June–September 2022, Toyoshima challenged Fujii once again for the Ōi title, but lost the 63rd Ōi title match 4 games to 1. Toyoshima also challenged for Nagase for the latter's Ōza title in 2022, but lost the 70th Ōza title match (August–October 2022) 3 games to 1.

In April–June 2024, Toyoshima challenge reigning Meijin Fujii for the latter's Meijin title but lost the 82nd Meijin Title Match 4 games to 1. On May 22, 2024, Toyoshima defeated Shingo Itō in a 72nd Ōza tournament challenger tournament game to become the 62nd professional shogi player to win 600 official games. (Note: Toyoshima's career record at the time was 600 wins and 309 losses in 911 games, including two impasse games, for a winning percentage of 0.660.) He was awarded the JSA's "Shogi Honor Award" for the achievement.

Toyoshima won the Ginga Tournament for the second time when he defeated Fujii in the finals of the 33rd Ginga Tournament. The game was actually played on October 24, 2025, but was recorded for later broadcast on the Igo & Shogi Channel; so, the final result was not made public until December 30, 2025.

=== Promotion history ===
Toyoshima's promotion history is as follows:

- 6-kyū: September 1999
- 4-dan: April 1, 2007
- 5-dan: May 8, 2009
- 6-dan: November 29, 2010
- 7-dan: April 19, 2012
- 8-dan: March 9, 2017
- 9-dan: May 17, 2019

=== Titles and other championships ===
Toyoshima has appeared in a major title match nineteen times, and has won six major titles. In addition to major titles, he has won six other shogi championships.

==== Major titles ====
Title	Years	Number of times
Ryūō	2019-20	2
Meijin	2019	1
Eiō	2020	1
Kisei	2018	1
Ōi	2018	1

==== Other championships ====
Tournament	Years	Number of times
Nihon Series JT Professional Tournament	2016 and 2020–21	3
Ginga Tournament	2019 and 2025	2
NHK Cup	2021	1

=== Awards and honors ===
Toyoshima has received a number awards and honors throughout his career for his accomplishments both on an off the shogi board. These include awards given out annually by the JSA for performance in official games as well as other awards for achievement.

==== Annual Shogi Awards ====
- 37th Annual Shogi Awards (April 2009 – March 2010): Best Winning Percentage, Most Games Won
- 38th Annual Shogi Awards (April 2010 – March 2011): Best New Player
- 39th Annual Shogi Awards (April 2011 – March 2012): Most Games Won
- 42nd Annual Shogi Awards (April 2014 – March 2015): Most Games Played, Game of the Year
- 44th Annual Shogi Awards (April 2016 – March 2017): Most Consecutive Games Won
- 46th Annual Shogi Awards (April 2018 – March 2019): Player of the Year
- 47th Annual Shogi Awards (April 2019 – March 2020): Excellent Player, Game of the Year
- 48th Annual Shogi Awards (April 2020 – March 2021): Fighting-spirit
- 49th Annual Shogi Awards (April 2021 – March 2022): Game of the Year

==== Other awards ====
- 2019: Osaka Culture Prize
- 2024: "Shogi Honor Award" for winning 600 official games as a professional.

=== Year-end prize money and game fee ranking ===
Toyoshima has finished in the "Top 10" of the JSA's year-end prize money/game fee rankings eleven times since turning professional: fifth in 2014 with JPY 21,600,000 in earnings; eighth in 2015 with JPY 24,590,000 in earnings; seventh in 2016 with JPY 24,920,000 in earnings; fourth in 2018 with JPY 47,220,000 in earnings; first in 2019 with JPY 71,570,000 in earnings; first in 2020 with JPY 106,450,000 in earnings; second in 2021 with JPY 81,450,000 in earnings; third in 2022 with JPY 50,710,000 in earnings; sixth with JPY 22,230,000 in earnings in 2023; seventh with JPY 23,480,000 in earnings in 2024; and sixth with JPY 17,610,000 in earnings in 2025.
