= Kazushiza Horiguchi =

Japanese shogi player

- Native name: 堀口一史座
- Born: February 28, 1975 (age 50)
- Hometown: Tokyo Metropolis

Career
- Achieved professional status: April 1, 1996 (aged 21)
- Badge Number: 218
- Rank: 8-dan
- Teacher: Hatasu Itō (8-dan)
- Tournaments won: 1
- Meijin class: Free
- Ryūō class: 6

Websites
- JSA profile page

Kazushiza Horiguchi (堀口 一史座, Horiguchi Kazushiza; born February 28, 1975) is a Japanese professional shogi player ranked 8-dan.

== Early life and apprenticeship ==
Horiguchi was born in Tokyo Metropolis on February 28, 1975. He learned shogi around the age of ten after seeing a shogi set at his grandparents' house. Horiguchi entered the Japan Shogi Association's apprentice school as a pupil of shogi professional Hatasu Itō at the rank of 6-kyū in 1988. He was promoted to the rank of 1-dan in 1991, and entered the 3-dan League in 1993.

Horiguchi came close to obtaining full professional status and the rank of 4-dan in the 17th 3-dan League (April 1995 – September 1995), but lost his last round game to future fellow professional Kimura Kazuki to miss out on promotion. The following league season, however, Horiguchi finished with a record of 14 wins and 4 losses in the 18th 3-dan League (October 1995 – April 1996) to win the league and earn promotion to the rank of 4-dan.

== Shogi professional ==
Horiguchi finished runner up in the 48th NHK Cup TV Shogi Tournament (1998) and the 8th Ginga-sen (2000), losing in the finals both times to Yoshiharu Habu. He also finished runner up in the 30th Shinjin-Ō} (1999), losing to Takeshi Fujii 2 games to none.

Horiguchi's only shogi championship to date came in 2002 when he defeated Masataka Sugimoto 3 games to 1 to win the 20th Asahi Open; he was, however, unable to defend his championship the following year, losing to Kōichi Fukaura by the same score in the finals of the 21st Asahi Open.

=== Promotion history ===
Horiguchi's promotion history is as follows:

- 6-kyū: 1989
- 1-dan: 1991
- 4-dan: April 1, 1996
- 5-dan: October 14, 1999
- 6-dan: October 1, 2002
- 7-dan: April 1, 2004
- 8-dan: December 15, 2022

=== Titles and other championships ===
Horiguchi has yet to appear in a major title match, but he has won one non-major title championship.

=== Awards and honors ===
Horiguchi won the Japan Shogi Association's Annual Shogi Award for "Best New Player" in 1991.
