= Kazutoshi Satō =

Japanese shogi player

- Native name: 佐藤和俊
- Born: June 12, 1978 (age 47)
- Hometown: Matsudo

Career
- Achieved professional status: October 1, 2003 (aged 25)
- Badge Number: 250
- Rank: 7-dan
- Teacher: Jun'ichi Kase (7-dan)
- Meijin class: B2
- Ryūō class: 3

Websites
- JSA profile page

Kazutoshi Satō (佐藤 和俊, Satō Kazutoshi; born June 12, 1978) is a Japanese professional shogi player ranked 7-dan.

== Early life and apprentice professional ==
Satō was born on June 12, 1978, in Matsudo, Chiba Prefecture. The first shogi book he ever read was a book written by shogi professional Hifumi Katō. The book was written for beginners and explained the apprentice school system and what it took to become a shogi professional. After reading this book, Satō decided to try to become strong enough to become an apprentice professional before graduating from elementary school, but still considered shogi to be just a hobby. As a fourth-grade student, he started traveling to neighboring Kashiwa to practice at the Kashiwa Shogi Center.

Satō entered the Japan Shogi Association's apprentice school as a student of shogi professional Jun'ichi Kase at the rank of 6-kyū in 1990, was promoted to the rank of 1-dan in 1994 and then obtained full professional status and the rank of 4-dan after finishing second in the 33rd 3-dan League with a record of 14 wins and 4 losses.

== Shogi professional ==
=== Promotion history ===
Satō's promotion history is as follows:

- 6-kyū: 1990
- 1-dan: 1994
- 4-dan: October 1, 2003
- 5-dan: November 2, 2007
- 6-dan: March 24, 2014
- 7-dan: October 30, 2019

=== Awards and honors ===
Satō won the Japan Shogi Association's Annual Shogi Award for "Most Consecutive Wins" for the 2007–2008 shogi year.
