= Kōichi Fukaura =

Japanese shogi player (born 1972)

- Native name: 深浦康市
- Born: February 14, 1972 (age 53)
- Hometown: Sasebo, Nagasaki

Career
- Achieved professional status: October 1, 1991 (aged 19)
- Badge Number: 201
- Rank: 9-dan
- Teacher: Motoji Hanamura (9-dan)
- Major titles won: 3
- Tournaments won: 10
- Meijin class: B2
- Ryūō class: 2
- Notable students: Daichi Sasaki; Yūki Saitō

Websites
- JSA profile page

Kōichi Fukaura (深浦 康市, Fukaura Kōichi; born February 14, 1972) is a Japanese professional shogi player ranked 9-dan. He is a three-time winner of the Ōi tournament, and also a former member of the Japan Shogi Association's board of directors.

== Early life ==
Fukaura was born in Sasebo, Nagasaki on February 14, 1972. As a young boy, he defeated Kōji Tanigawa, who was the reigning Meijin title holder at the time, in a Rook handicap game at a shogi event in Fukuoka in 1983. Shortly thereafter, he went to stay with relatives in Ōmiya, Saitama in order to be closer to Tokyo and study under shogi professional Motoji Hanamura. In 1984, Fukaura entered the Japan Shogi Association's apprentice school in 1984 at the rank of 6-kyū under the guidance of Hanamura. Although promotion to 5-kyū took a year, he progressed more rapidly up the ranks after that and obtained full-professional status in October 1991 at the age of 19.

== Shogi professional ==
Fukaura's first tournament victory as a professional came in his first tournament as professional when he defeated Kunio Yonenaga 3 games to 2 in the final of the 1992 All Nihon Pro Shogi Tournament.

In 1993, he won the Hayazashi Senshuken and Quick Play Young Professionals Tournament tournaments. He would win the Quick Play Young Professionals Tournament three more times from 1999 to 2001, becoming the only player to win the tournament three years in a row.

In 2002, Fukaura defeated defending champion Kazushiza Horiguchi 3 games to 1 to win the 21st Asahi Open tournament. Fukaura advanced to the championship match by defeating Habu in the final game of the challenger tournament. The following year, however, Fukaura was unable to repeat his result, when lost the 22nd Asahi Open and his title to Habu three games to two.

Fukaura's first appearance in a major title match came in 1996 when he challenged Yoshiharu Habu for the 37th Ōi title, but was defeated 4 games to 1. His next major title appearance came more than 10 years later in 2007 when he once again challenged Habu for the Ōi title. Fukaura defeated reigning Ryūō title holder Akira Watanabe to win the right to challenge Habu for the 48th Ōi title, and then went on to beat Habu 4 games to 3 to capture his first major title. Fukaura successfully defended his Ōi title against Habu in 2008 (4 games to 3), and then again in 2009 against Kazuki Kimura (4 games to 3). Fukaura lost the first three games to Kimura before coming back to win the final four and defend his title, thus becoming only the second player to ever come back from such a deficit in a 7-game match. He was, however, unable to defend his title for the third consecutive time when he lost the 51st Ōi match to Akihito Hirose 4 games to 2 in 2010.

In January 2009, Fukaura became the 39th player to reach 600 wins in official games when he defeated Daisuke Nakagawa in the 2nd Asahi Cup Open tournament. His winning percentage of .681 was the fourth highest of all professionals who had previously achieved the same result. That same year, Fukaura and Habu met once again in the 58th Ōshō title match. Fukaura was actually leading the match 3 games to 2 before Habu won the final two games to defend his title. The two met again in the title matches of the 81st Kisei (in 2010) and 82nd Kisei (in 2011) with Habu defending his title each time by the score of 3 games to 0. Game 2 of the 82nd Kisei had to actually be replayed with colors reversed because the first game ended in sennichite. The replay game lasted 206 moves before Habu won.

In November 2017, Fukaura became the 19th player to win 800 official games when he defeated Shintarō Saitō in a 67th Ōshō challenger league game.

Fukaura defeated Akira Inaba to win the 69th NHK Cup in March 2020.

=== Promotion history ===
Fukaura's promotion history is as follows:

- 6-kyū: 1984
- 1-dan: 1987
- 4-dan: October 1, 1991
- 5-dan: August 27, 1994
- 6-dan: July 22, 1997
- 7-dan: June 28, 2001
- 8-dan: April 1, 2004
- 9-dan: September 26, 2008

=== Titles and other championships ===
Fukaura has appeared in major title matches a total of eight times, and has won the Ōi three times. In addition to major titles, Fukaura has won ten other shogi championships during his career.

==== Major titles ====
Title	Years	Number of times overall
Ōi	2007–09	3

==== Other championships ====
Tournament	Years	Number of times
NHK Cup	2019	1
Ginga Tournament	2015	1
^{*}Asahi Open	2002	1
^{*}Quick Play Young Professionals Tournament	1993, 1999–2001	4
^{*}All Star Kachinuki-sen	1999	1
^{*}Hayazashi Senshuken	1993	1
^{*}All Nihon Pro	1992	1

Note: Tournaments marked with an asterisk (*) are no longer held.

=== Awards and honors ===
Fukaura has received a number of awards and honors throughout his career for his accomplishments both on an off the shogi board. These include awards given out annually by the JSA for performance in official games as well as other JSA awards for career accomplishments, and awards received from governmental organizations, etc. for contributions made to Japanese society.

==== Annual Shogi Awards ====
- 21st Annual Awards (April 1993 – March 1994): Best New Player, Fighting-spirit Award
- 22nd Annual Awards (April 1994 – March 1995): Fighting-spirit Award
- 23rd Annual Awards (April 1995 – March 1996): Most Games Played, Most Games Won
- 31st Annual Awards (April 2003 – March 2004): Technique Award, Best Winning Percentage
- 35th Annual Awards (April 2007 – March 2008): Fighting-spirit Award, Game of the Year
- 38th Annual Awards (April 2010 – March 2011): Game of the Year
- 44th Annual Awards (April 2016 – March 2017): Game of the Year

==== Other awards ====
- 2007: Nagasaki Prefecture Citizen's Commendation/Special Award
- 2009: Shogi Honor Award (Awarded by the JSA in recognition of winning 600 official games as a professional)
- 2017: Shogi Fighting Spirit Honor Award (Awarded by the JSA in recognition of winning 800 official games as a professional)

=== Year-end prize money and game fee ranking ===
Fukaura has finished in the "Top 10" of the JSA's year-end prize money and game fee rankings fourteen times and in the "Top 3" once since 1993.

Year	Amount	Rank
1993	¥21,090,000	8th
2003	¥33,300,000	6th
2004	¥23,840,000	8th
2005	¥19,540,000	10th
2007	¥33,920,000	5th
2008	¥34,970,000	5th
2009	¥48,640,000	3rd
2010	¥31,730,000	5th
2011	¥21,450,000	6th
2012	¥21,000,000	8th
2014	¥17,200,000	8th
2015	¥23,730,000	9th
2016	¥18,490,000	10th
2018	¥21,890,000	10th

- Note: All amounts are given in Japanese yen and include prize money and fees earned from official tournaments and games held from January 1 to December 31.

== JSA director ==
Fukaura was selected to be a non-executive director for a two-year term at the 63rd JSA Annual General Meeting held in June 2012. He served in this capacity until June 2014.
