= Yoshiyuki Matsumoto =

Japanese shogi player

- Native name: 松本佳介
- Born: December 17, 1971 (age 54)
- Hometown: Saitama Prefecture

Career
- Achieved professional status: October 1, 1995 (aged 23)
- Badge Number: 216
- Rank: 7-dan
- Teacher: Shōji Kenmochi (9-dan)
- Meijin class: Free
- Ryūō class: 6

Websites
- JSA profile page

Yoshiyuki Matsumoto (松本 佳介, Matsumoto Yoshiyuki; December 17, 1971) is a Japanese professional shogi player ranked 7-dan.

== Shogi professional ==
=== Promotion history ===
The promotion history for Ueno is as follows:

- 6-kyū: 1984
- 1-dan: 1989
- 4-dan: October 1, 1995
- 5-dan: January 26, 2001
- 6-dan: July 1, 2008
- 7-dan: April 1, 2022
