= Horiguchi =

Horiguchi (written: 堀口) is a Japanese surname. Notable people with the surname include:

- Genki Horiguchi (堀口 元気, born 1978), Japanese professional wrestler
- Horiguchi Daigaku (堀口 大学, 1892–1981), Japanese poet and translator
- Kazushiza Horiguchi (堀口 一史座, born 1975), Japanese shogi player
- Kyoji Horiguchi (堀口 恭司, born 1990), Japanese mixed martial artist
- Sutemi Horiguchi (堀口 捨己, 1895–1984), Japanese architect and historian
- Yukiko Horiguchi (堀口 悠紀子, born 1983), Japanese animator and illustrator
- Yusuke Horiguchi, former Associate Director, IMF
