= Kazushi Watanabe =

Japanese shogi player (born 1994)

- Native name: 渡辺和史
- Born: October 6, 1994 (age 30)
- Hometown: Shinjuku, Tokyo

Career
- Achieved professional status: October 1, 2019 (aged 24)
- Badge Number: 319
- Rank: 7-dan
- Teacher: Takahiro Toyokawa (7-dan)
- Meijin class: B2
- Ryūō class: 4

Websites
- JSA profile page

Kazushi Watanabe (渡辺 和史, Watanabe Kazushi; born October 6, 1994) is a Japanese professional shogi player ranked 7-dan.

== Early life and apprenticeship ==
Watanabe was born on October 6, 1994, in Shinjuku, Tokyo. He learned how to play shogi from his father when he was about five years old, and was accepted into the Japan Shogi Association's apprentice school under the guidance of shogi professional Takahiro Toyokawa at the rank of 6-kyū in February 2008. He was promoted to the rank of apprentice professional 3-dan in April 2013, but finished with a record of 1 win and 17 losses in his first season of 3-dan League (54th 3-dan League October 2013 – March 2014). Encouraged not to give up and not to worry about being demoted to 2-dan by his mentor Toyokawa, Watanabe's results improved and he finally obtained full professional status and the corresponding rank of 4-dan in October 2019 after winning the 65th 3-dan League (April 2019 – September 2019) with a record of 16 wins and 2 losses.

== Shogi professional ==
=== Promotion history ===
Watanabe's promotion history is as follows.

- 6-kyū: February 2008
- 3-dan: October 2013
- 4-dan: October 1, 2019
- 5-dan: March 10, 2022
- 6-dan: March 7, 2023
- 7-dan: May 10, 2024

=== Awards and honors ===
Watanabe won the Japan Shogi Association's Annual Shogi Award for "Most Consecutive Games Won" with 20 straight wins in 2022. He won the same award in 2023 with 18 straight wins.

== Personal life ==
Watanabe has stated that he has been interested in the study of history ever since he was a young boy. After graduating from high school, he enrolled in Taisho University because he wanted to broaden his horizons instead of just focusing on shogi. He graduated from the university in 2016.
