= Tetsurō Itodani =

Japanese shogi player (born 1988)

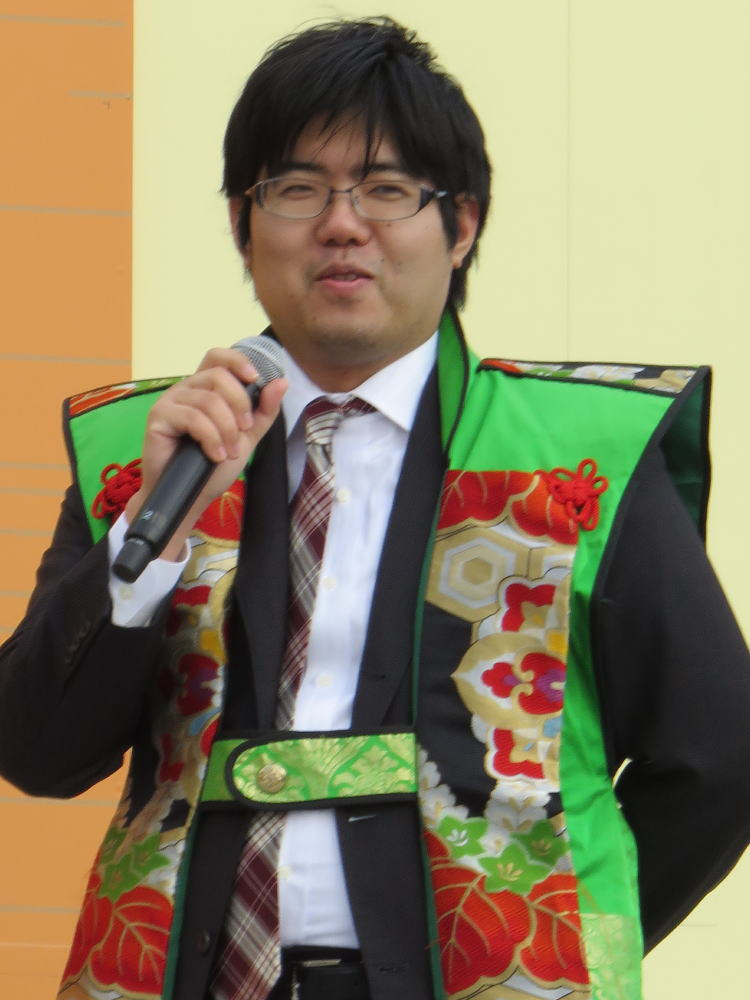
- Itodani at a human shogi event in November 2016
- Native name: 糸谷哲郎
- Born: October 5, 1988 (age 37)
- Hometown: Hiroshima

Career
- Achieved professional status: April 1, 2006 (aged 17)
- Badge number: 260
- Rank: 9-dan
- Teacher: Nobuo Mori
- Major titles won: 1
- Tournaments won: 1
- Meijin class: A
- Ryūō class: 2

Websites
- JSA profile page

Tetsurō Itodani (糸谷 哲郎, Itodani Tetsurō; born October 5, 1988) is a Japanese professional shogi player, ranked 9-dan and former Ryūō title holder. He is also an executive director of the Japan Shogi Association.

== Early life and apprentice professional ==
Itodani was born in Hiroshima, Japan on October 5, 1988. He learned how to play shogi when he was five years old and he won the 1st and 2nd Elementary School Ōshō tournaments for grades 1 to 3 in 1995 and 1996 as an elementary school student. He entered the Japan Shogi Association's apprentice school in October 1998 at the rank of 6-kyū as a protegee of shogi professional Nobuo Mori. He was promoted to 1-dan in February 2003 and to 3-dan in 2004.

From October 2004 to March 2005, he participated in the 36th 3-dan League finishing in fourth place with a record of 13 wins and 5 losses. The following season in the 37th 3-dan League (April 2005 – September 2005), he finished in third place with a record of 12 wins and 6 losses and earned one "promotion point" towards professional status. He obtained professional status and the rank of 4-dan in April 2006 after winning the 38th 3-dan League (October 2005 – March 2006) with a record of 14 wins and 4 losses.

== Shogi professional ==
Itodani, together with Akira Inaba, Masayuki Toyoshima and Akihiro Murata, is one of four Kansai-based young shogi professionals who are collectively referred to as the "Young Kansai Big Four" (関西若手四天王 Kansai Wakate Shitennō).

Itodani won the 37th Shinjin-Ō in October 2006 for his only non-major-title tournament championship. Itodani actually started the 37th Shinjin-Ō tournament while still an apprentice professional 3-dan, but was promoted to professional 4-dan during the tournament.

Itodani defeated the reigning Ryūō Toshiyuki Moriuchi in 2014 to win the 27th Ryūō title for his first and to date only major title victory.

In April–May 2026, Itodani challenged the reigning Meijin Sōta Fujii for the Meijin Title but lost the 84th Meijin Title Match 4 games to none.

=== Promotion history ===
The promotion history of Itodani is as follows:

- 6-kyū: 1998
- 4-dan: April 1, 2006
- 5-dan: May 1, 2008
- 6-dan: January 12, 2012
- 7-dan: September 8, 2014
- 8-dan: December 4, 2014
- 9-dan: April 16, 2026

=== Titles and other championships ===
Itodani has appeared in major title matches five times and has won one title. He has won one non-major title tournament.

=== Awards and honors ===
Itodani was awarded the Japan Shogi Association Annual Shogi Awards for "Best New Player" and "Most Consecutive Games Won" in 2006 and "Excellent Player" in 2014.

=== Year-end prize money and game fee ranking ===
Itodani has finished in the "Top 10" of the JSA's year-end prize money/game fee rankings three times since turning professional: second in 2015 with JPY 55,310,000 in earnings, fourth in 2016 with JPY 35,430,000 in earnings and eighth in 2021 with JPY 18,760,000 in earnings.

== JSA director ==
Itodani was elected an executive director of the JSA at its 76th General Meeting in June 2025.

== Personal life ==
Itodani lived with his family and attended junior and senior high schools in Hiroshima while a member of the JSA's apprentice school. A year after turning professional in 2006, he was accepted into Osaka University majoring in philosophy; so, he moved from Hiroshima to Minoh, Osaka to attend university. After completing his undergraduate studies in 2011, Itodani enrolled in the university's graduate school to continue his study of philosophy, particularly his research of the German philosopher Martin Heidegger. He received his Master of Arts in March 2017, which made him the first major-title winner to receive an advanced academic degree.
