= Takayuki Kuroda =

Japanese shogi player (born 1996)

- Native name: 黒田尭之
- Born: September 26, 1996 (age 29)
- Hometown: Matsuyama, Ehime Prefecture

Career
- Achieved professional status: April 1, 2019 (aged 22)
- Badge number: 318
- Rank: 6-dan
- Teacher: Mamoru Hatakeyama (8-dan)
- Meijin class: C1
- Ryūō class: 6

Websites
- JSA profile page

Takayuki Kuroda (黒田 尭之, Kuroda Takayuki; born September 26, 1996) is a Japanese professional shogi player ranked 6-dan.

== Early life, amateur shogi and apprenticeship ==
Kuroda was born on September 26, 1996, in Matsuyama, Ehime Prefecture. He learned how to play shogi from his father when he was about six years old, and began going to the Matsuyama shogi center shortly thereafter to improve his game. As a sixth-grade elementary school student in 2008, he finished runner up in the 33rd Elementary School Student Meijin Tournament, defeating fellow future professional shogi player Yasuhiro Masuda in the semi-finals, and also won the upper-grade section of the 7th Elementary School Student Kurashiki Ōshō Tournament. In September 2008, he was accepted into the Japan Shogi Association (JSA) apprentice school under the guidance of shogi professional Mamoru Hatakeyama at the rank of 6-kyū.

In order to participate in the apprentice school games held at the JSA's Kansai Branch in Osaka, Kuroda would take a night ferry from Matsuyama. He was promoted to the rank of apprentice professional 3-dan in 2013, and just missed out on obtaining full professional status and the corresponding rank of 4-dan in October 2016 after finishing third in the 59th 3-dan League (April 2016 – September 2016) with a record of 12 wins and 6 losses. Kuroda actually finished tied with several other players with 12 wins and second place, but his lower league seed meant that he was awarded third place and a promotion point instead. Kuroda once again fell one win short of promotion to 4-dan in the 62nd 3-dan League (October 2017 – March 2018) and the 63rd 3-dan League (March 2018 – September 2018), but finally obtained full professional status in April 2019 after finishing second in the 64th 3-dan League (October 2018 – March 2019) with a record of 13 wins and 5 losses.

== Shogi professional ==
=== Promotion history ===
Kuroda's promotion is as follows:

- 6-kyū: September 2008
- 3-dan: April 2013
- 4-dan: April 1, 2019
- 5-dan: February 4, 2021
- 6-dan: April 10, 2026
