= Tatsunosuke Kanda =

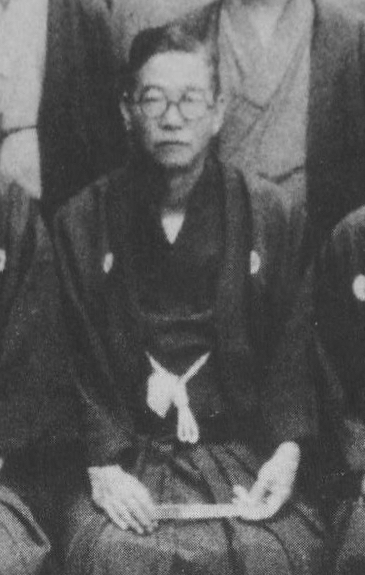
- Native name: 神田辰之助
- Born: February 22, 1893
- Hometown: Honjōmura (now part of Higashinada-ku, Kobe)
- Nationality: Japanese
- Died: September 6, 1943 (aged 50)

Career
- Achieved professional status: 1917 (aged approximately 25)
- Rank: 9 dan
- Teacher: Sankichi Sakata, Kinjirō Kimi

Tatsunosuke Kanda (神田 辰之助, kanda tatsunosuke; February 22, 1893 – September 6, 1943) was a Japanese professional shogi player who achieved the rank of 8-dan (the highest dan at the time) and also 9-dan, which was an honorary rank, after death.

Kanda's son, Shizuo Kanda (神田鎮雄), also became a professional player.

== Shogi professional ==
Kanda was involved in a controversy over his promotion to the rank of 8-dan, which led to a western faction of shogi players (the Japan Shogi Reform Society 日本将棋革新協会 nihon shōgi kakushin kyōkai) splitting away from the newly formed Japan Shogi Association.

When the shogi world united into the Shogi Consolidation Association (将棋大成会, shōgi taisei-kai) (an early form of the Japan Shogi Association) in 1936, Kanda became the head of the western Kansai branch.

== Titles and other championships ==
Kanda was one of the 8 competitors in the very first tournament league for the first Meijin title in 1937, when the title shifted from a hereditary system to a tournament competition. Yoshio Kimura was the winner and became the first Meijin.

In 1942, Kanda was the challenger for the third Meijin title tournament against Yoshio Kimura. However, he lost all four games, and Kimura retained the title.
