= Akihiro Ida =

Japanese shogi player (born 1996)

- Native name: 井田明宏
- Born: December 6, 1996 (age 29)
- Hometown: Kyoto, Japan

Career
- Achieved professional status: April 1, 2021 (aged 24)
- Badge number: 327
- Rank: 5-dan
- Teacher: Kenji Kobayashi (9-dan)
- Meijin class: C2
- Ryūō class: 4

Websites
- JSA profile page

Akihiro Ida (井田 明宏, Ida Akihiro; born December 6, 1996) is a Japanese professional shogi player ranked 5-dan.

== Early life and apprenticeship ==
Ida was born in Kyoto, Japan on December 6, 1996. He became interested in shogi after seeing a column about it in a newspaper.

Ida entered the Japan Shogi Association's apprentice school in September 2009 under the guidance of shogi professional Kenji Kobayashi. Ida was promoted to the rank of apprentice professional 3-dan in April 2017 and obtained full professional status and the rank of 4-dan after tying for first place in the 68th 3-dan League (October 2020 – March 2021) with a record of 13 wins and 5 losses.

== Shogi professional ==
=== Promotion history ===
The promotion history for Ida is as follows.

- 6-kyū: September 2010
- 3-dan: April 2017
- 4-dan: April 1, 2021
- 5-dan: November 6, 2024
