= Shūji Muranaka =

Japanese shogi player

- Native name: 村中秀史
- Born: March 12, 1981 (age 44)
- Hometown: Kita, Tokyo

Career
- Achieved professional status: October 1, 2004 (aged 23)
- Badge Number: 253
- Rank: 7-dan
- Teacher: Toshio Takayanagi (Honorary 9-dan)
- Meijin class: C2
- Ryūō class: 3

Websites
- JSA profile page
- Official website

Shūji Muranaka (村中 秀史, Muranaka Shūji; born March 12, 1981) is a Japanese professional shogi player ranked 7-dan.

== Early life and apprenticeship ==
Muranaka was born on March 12, 1981, in Kita, Tokyo. He entered the Japan Shogi Association's apprentice school at the rank of 6-kyū as a student of shogi professional Toshio Takayanagi in 1992. He was the last apprentice taken on by Takayanagi.

Muranaka was promoted to the rank of 1-dan in 1996 and obtained full professional status and the rank of 4-dan in October 2004 after finishing tied for first in the 35th 3-dan League (April 2004 – September 2004) with a record of 14 wins and 4 losses.

== Shogi professional ==
=== Promotion history ===
The promotion history for Muranaka is as follows:

- 6-kyū: 1992
- 1-dan: 1996
- 4-dan: October 1, 2004
- 5-dan: September 15, 2009
- 6-dan: October 16, 2009
- 7-dan: October 4, 2019

== Personal life ==
On December 13, 2022, the JSA announced on its official website that Muranaka had married tarento Mary Hatsumi on November 22, 2022.
