= Ōi (shogi) =

One of eight major titles in Japanese professional shogi

- Native name: 王位戦
- Type: Title
- Official name: Ito En O-i Ochahai Ōisen (伊藤園お～いお茶杯王位戦)
- Sponsor(s): Ito En
- Winner's title: Ōi
- Reigning champion: Sōta Fujii
- Number of times held: 66
- First held: 1960
- Last held: 2025
- Lifetime champions: Yasuharu Ōyama; Makoto Nakamura; Yoshiharu Habu
- Most times won: Yoshiharu Habu (18)
- Most consecutive wins: Yasuharu Ōyama (12)

Website(s)
- JSA tournament website (in Japanese)
- Sponsor's tournament website (in Japanese)

Ōi (王位) is one of the eight major titles in professional shogi, and it means "the king's rank" (王 ō 'king' + 位 i 'rank, position').

== Background ==
The annual tournament started in 1960, sponsored by a group of local newspapers which has consisted of Shimbun Sansha Rengō (Three-Newspaper Association). (Note: Despite its name, Shimbun Sansha Rengō is currently formed by six newspapers: Hokkaido Shimbun, Tokyo Shimbun, Chunichi Shimbun, Kobe Shimbun, Tokushima Shimbun and Nishinippon Shimbun.) With the addition of Ōi, there were four major shogi titles along with Meijin, Ninth Dan (Ryūō), and Ōshō.

== Format ==
The challenger for the title is determined by three-step preliminary round that comprises 1st heat, league competition and final playoff. Top eight players in 1st heat and top four players of previous year are divided into two six-player leagues. Top one of each league advances to final playoff, and the winner of one-game match becomes the challenger.

The player that wins four games out of seven first in the championship will become the new Ōi title holder. Each championship games assign players a six-hour playtime during two days.

== Lifetime Ōi ==
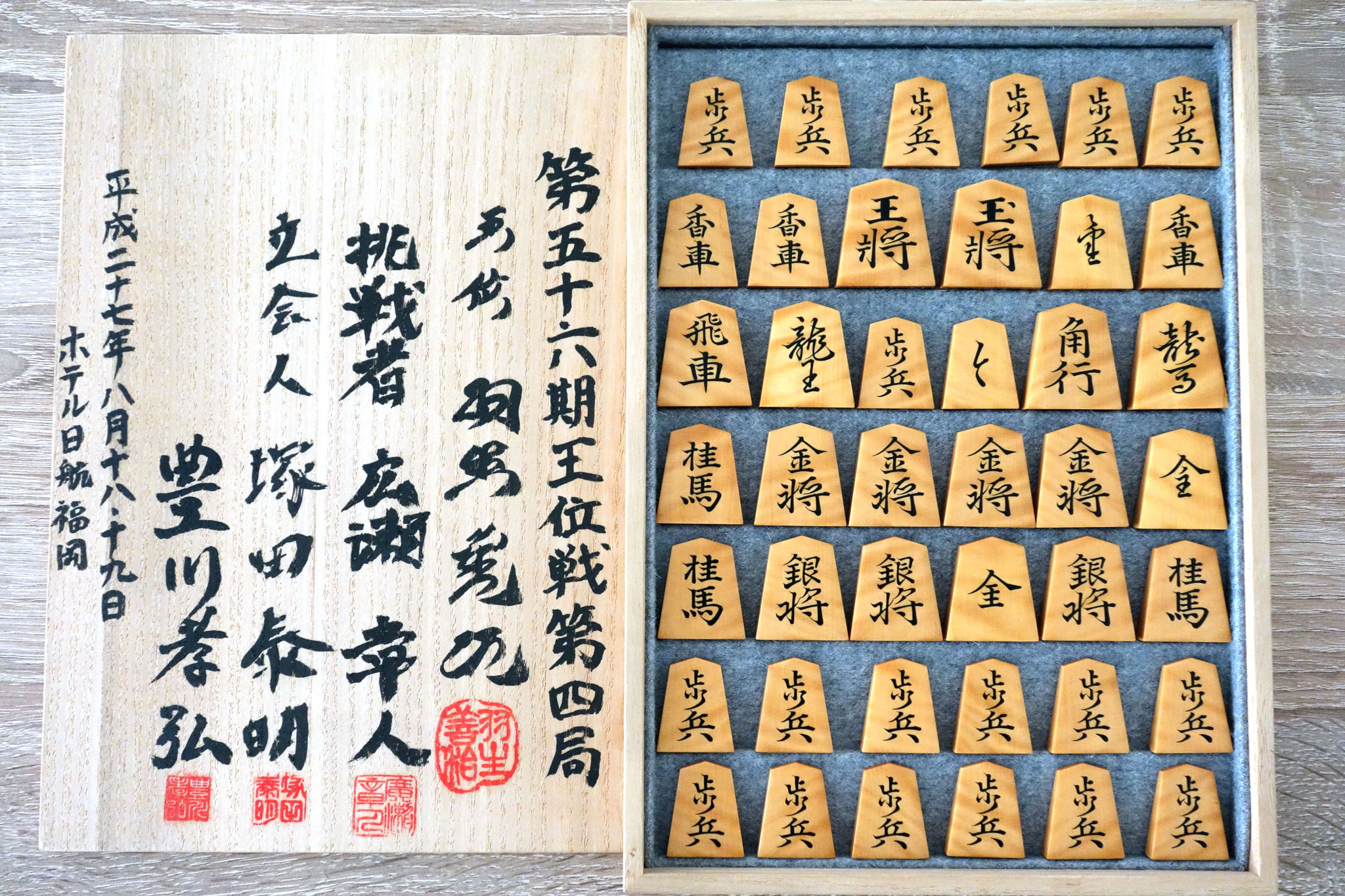
Shogi pieces used during the fourth game of the 56th Ōi sen in 2015.

Lifetime Ōi (永世王位, Eisei Ōi) is the title awarded to a player who won the championship five times in a row or ten times in total. Active players may qualify for this title, but it is only officially awarded upon their retirement or death.

Only four professionals have qualified for the Lifetime Oi. They are as follows:

- Yasuharu Ōyama (deceased)
- Makoto Nakahara (retired)
- Yoshiharu Habu (active)
- Sōta Fujii (active)

== Winners ==
No.	Year	Winner	Score	Opponent
1	1960	Yasuharu Ōyama	4–1	Masao Tsukada
2	1961	Yasuharu Ōyama (2)	4–1	Yuzō Maruta
3	1962	Yasuharu Ōyama (3)	4–0	Motoji Hanamura
4	1963	Yasuharu Ōyama (4)	4–2	Hifumi Katō
5	1964	Yasuharu Ōyama (5)	4–2	Tatsuya Futakami
6	1965	Yasuharu Ōyama (6)	4–0	Daigoroh Satō
7	1966	Yasuharu Oyama (7)	4–1	Michio Ariyoshi
8	1967	Yasuharu Ōyama (8)	4–1	Nobuyuki Ōuchi
9	1968	Yasuharu Ōyama (9)	4–2	Michio Ariyoshi
10	1969	Yasuharu Ōyama (10)	4–2	Kazuyoshi Nishimura
11	1970	Yasuharu Ōyama (11)	4–1	Kunio Yonenaga
12	1971	Yasuharu Ōyama (12)	4–3	Makoto Nakahara
13	1972	Kunio Naitō	4–1	Yasuharu Ōyama
14	1973	Makoto Nakahara	4–0	Kunio Naitō
15	1974	Makoto Nakahara (2)	4–2	Kunio Yonenaga
16	1975	Makoto Nakahara (3)	4–2	Kunio Naitō
17	1976	Makoto Nakahara (4)	4–2	Osamu Katsuura
18	1977	Makoto Nakahara (5)	4–2	Kunio Yonenaga
19	1978	Makoto Nakahara (6)	4–1	Yasuharu Ōyama
20	1979	Kunio Yonenaga	4–3	Makoto Nakahara
21	1980	Makoto Nakahara (7)	4–0	Kunio Yonenaga
22	1981	Makoto Nakahara (8)	4–3	Yasuharu Ōyama
23	1982	Kunio Naitō (2)	4–2	Makoto Nakahara
24	1983	Michio Takahashi	4–2	Kunio Naitō
25	1984	Hifumi Katō	4–3	Michio Takahashi
26	1985	Michio Takahashi (2)	4–0	Hifumi Katō
27	1986	Michio Takahashi (3)	4–0	Kunio Yonenaga
28	1987	Koji Tanigawa	4–1	Michio Takahashi
29	1988	Keiji Mori	4–3	Koji Tanigawa
30	1989	Koji Tanigawa (2)	4–1	Keiji Mori
31	1990	Koji Tanigawa (3)	4–3	Yasumitsu Satō
32	1991	Koji Tanigawa (4)	4–2	Hiroki Nakata
33	1992	Masataka Goda	4–2	Koji Tanigawa
34	1993	Yoshiharu Habu	4–0	Masataka Goda
35	1994	Yoshiharu Habu (2)	4–3	Masataka Goda
36	1995	Yoshiharu Habu (3)	4–2	Masataka Goda
37	1996	Yoshiharu Habu (4)	4–1	Koichi Fukaura
38	1997	Yoshiharu Habu (5)	4–1	Yasumitsu Satō
39	1998	Yoshiharu Habu (6)	4–2	Yasumitsu Satō
40	1999	Yoshiharu Habu (7)	4–0	Koji Tanigawa
41	2000	Yoshiharu Habu (8)	4–3	Koji Tanigawa
42	2001	Yoshiharu Habu (9)	4–0	Nobuyuki Yashiki
43	2002	Koji Tanigawa (5)	4–1	Yoshiharu Habu
44	2003	Koji Tanigawa (6)	4–1	Yoshiharu Habu
45	2004	Yoshiharu Habu (10)	4–1	Koji Tanigawa
46	2005	Yoshiharu Habu (11)	4–3	Yasumitsu Satō
47	2006	Yoshiharu Habu (12)	4–2	Yasumitsu Satō
48	2007	Koichi Fukaura	4–3	Yoshiharu Habu
49	2008	Koichi Fukaura (2)	4–3	Yoshiharu Habu
50	2009	Koichi Fukaura (3)	4–3	Kazuki Kimura
51	2010	Akihito Hirose	4–2	Koichi Fukaura
52	2011	Yoshiharu Habu (13)	4–3	Akihito Hirose
53	2012	Yoshiharu Habu (14)	4–1	Takeshi Fujii
54	2013	Yoshiharu Habu (15)	4–1	Hisashi Namekata
55	2014	Yoshiharu Habu (16)	4–2–1 (Note: Game three ended in impasse after 178 moves and was officially recorded as a draw. This was the first drawn championship-round game in the history of the tournament. It was also the first time in 22 years that a championship-round game in one of the seven major title matches ended in impasse.)	Kazuki Kimura
56	2015	Yoshiharu Habu (17)	4–1	Akihito Hirose
57	2016	Yoshiharu Habu (18)	4–3	Kazuki Kimura
58	2017	Tatsuya Sugai	4–1	Yoshiharu Habu
59	2018	Masayuki Toyoshima	4–3	Tatsuya Sugai
60	2019	Kazuki Kimura	4–3	Masayuki Toyoshima
61	2020	Sōta Fujii	4–0	Kazuki Kimura
62	2021	Sōta Fujii (2)	4–1	Masayuki Toyoshima
63	2022	Sōta Fujii (3)	4–1	Masayuki Toyoshima
64	2023	Sōta Fujii (4)	4–1	Daichi Sasaki
65	2024	Sōta Fujii (5)	4–1	Akira Watanabe
66	2025	Sōta Fujii (6)	4–2	Takuya Nagase
67	2026	Sōta Fujii (7)	4–2	Takumi Itō

== Records ==
- Most titles overall: Yoshiharu Habu, 18
- Most consecutive titles: Yasuharu Ōyama, 12 (1960–1971)
