= Shōgo Orita =

Japanese professional shogi player, YouTuber

- Native name: 折田翔吾
- Born: October 28, 1989 (age 36)
- Hometown: Osaka, Japan

Career
- Achieved professional status: April 1, 2020 (aged 30)
- Badge Number: 321
- Rank: 5-dan
- Teacher: Masayuki Moriyasu (7-dan)
- Meijin class: C2
- Ryūō class: 4

Websites
- JSA profile page

Shōgo Orita (折田 翔吾, Orita Shōgo; October 28, 1989) is a Japanese professional shogi player ranked 5-dan.

Orita is the fourth amateur to obtain professional status without doing so via the Japan Shogi Association's apprentice professional school after he became the second player to pass the Professional Admission Test in February 2020.

== Shogi professional ==
=== Promotion history ===
The promotion history for Orita is as follows.

- 4-dan: April 1, 2020
- 5-dan: October 6, 2022

== YouTuber ==
Orita is also popular shogi YouTuber whose channel "Age Age Shogi Commentary" has, as of April 2020, a little over 40 thousand subscribers and has had almost 23 million views since it was started in April 2016.
