= Saito Morimoto =

Japanese shogi player

- Native name: 森本才跳
- Born: May 31, 2001 (age 24)
- Hometown: Nishinomiya, Hyōgo, Japan

Career
- Achieved professional status: April 1, 2023 (aged 21)
- Badge Number: 337
- Rank: 4-dan
- Teacher: Kenji Kobayashi (9-dan)
- Meijin class: C2
- Ryūō class: 6

Websites
- JSA profile page

Saito Morimoto (森本 才跳, Morimoto Saito; May 31, 2001) is a Japanese professional shogi player ranked 4-dan.

== Early life and amateur shogi ==
Morimoto was born in Nishinomiya, Hyōgo Prefecture, on May 31, 2001. He started playing shogi on the recommendation of his parents. He began regularly playing at the shogi club at the Japan Shogi Association's Kansai Branch Office. As a second-grade elementary school student at Hiraki Elementary School in Nishinomiya, he started attending a shogi school run by shogi professional Kenji Kobayashi. As a third-grade elementary school student, he finished tied for 3rd place in the lower-grade division of the 9th All Japan Elementary School Student Kurashiki Ōshō Tournament and won the 24th Tanigawa Cup Elementary Student Shogi Tournament (谷川杯争奪小学生将棋大会, Tanigawa-hai Sōdatsu Shōgakusei Shōgi Taikai) in 2010.The following year (2011) as a fourth-grade student, he tied for third place in the upper-grade division of the 10th All Japan Elementary School Student Kurashiki Ōshō Tournament and finished in second place of the upper-grade division of a children's tournament held together with the 37th JT Nihon Series preliminary round game being played in Fukuoka.

In 2012, Morimoto won the 37th Elementary School Student Meijin Tournament as a fifth-grade student in April and was then accepted into the JSA's apprentice school as a student of Kobayashi at the rank of apprentice professional 6-kyū in September. He was promoted to the rank of apprentice professional 3-dan in April 2019, and he obtained regular professional status and the rank of 4-dan in April 2023 after finishing second in the 72nd 3-dan League (October 2022 – March 2023) with a record of 13 wins and 5 losses.

== Shogi professional ==
=== Promotion history ===
The promotion history for Morimoto is as follows.

- 6-kyū: September 2012
- 3-dan: April 2019
- 4-dan: April 1, 2023
