= Yūta Ishikawa =

Japanese shogi player (born 1994)

- Native name: 石川優太
- Born: November 11, 1994 (age 30)
- Hometown: Kawagoe, Mie

Career
- Achieved professional status: October 1, 2019 (aged 24)
- Badge Number: 320
- Rank: 5-dan
- Teacher: Nobuo Mori (9-dan)
- Meijin class: C2
- Ryūō class: 4

Websites
- JSA profile page

Yūta Ishikawa (石川 優太, Ishikawa Yūta; born November 11, 1994) is a Japanese professional shogi player ranked 5-dan.

== Early life and apprenticeship ==
Ishikawa was born on November 11, 1984, in Kawagoe, Mie. When he was around six years old, he saw his grandfather playing shogi and became interested in the learning how to play. In September 2006, he was accepted into the Japan Shogi Association's apprentice school under the guidance of shogi professional Nobuo Mori at the rank of 6-kyū, and was promoted to the rank of apprentice professional 3-dan in April 2013. Ishikawa obtained full professional status and the corresponding rank of 4-dan in October 2019 after finishing in second place in the 65th 3-dan League (April 2019 – September 2019) with a record of 13 wins and 5 losses.

== Shogi professional ==
=== Promotion history ===
Ishikawa's promotion history is as follows.

- 6-kyū: September 2006
- 3-dan: April 2013
- 4-dan: October 1, 2019
- 5-dan: September 20, 2022
