= Kentarō Ishii =

Japanese shogi player

- Native name: 石井健太郎
- Born: April 13, 1992 (age 34)
- Hometown: Chiba, Chiba

Career
- Achieved professional status: October 1, 2013 (aged 21)
- Badge number: 293
- Rank: 7-dan
- Teacher: Kazuharu Shoshi (7-dan)
- Meijin class: B2
- Ryūō class: 3

Websites
- JSA profile page

Kentarō Ishii (石井 健太郎, Ishii Kentarō; born April 13, 1992) is a Japanese professional shogi player ranked 7-dan.

== Early life and apprenticeship ==
Ishii was born on April 13, 1992, in Chiba, Chiba. He became interested in shogi after receiving a shogi set as a present from his grandfather, and started attending a shogi school run by shogi professional Kazuharu Shoshi as a kindergartener. Ishii failed the entrance examination for the Japan Shogi Association's apprentice school twice before finally passing it and being accepted into the school at the rank of 6-kyū in 2004 under the guidance of Shoshi. He was promoted to the rank of 1-dan in 2007, 3-dan in 2010, and finally obtained full professional status and the rank of 4-dan in October 2013 after winning the 53rd 3-dan League with a record of 15 wins and 3 losses.

== Shogi professional ==
=== Promotion history ===
Ishii's promotion history is as follows:

- 6-kyū: September 2004
- 3-dan: April 2010
- 4-dan: October 1, 2013
- 5-dan: October 30, 2017
- 6-dan: June 5, 2020
- 7-dan: March 6, 2024
