= Ryūō =

Japanese professional shogi tournament

Ryūō (also Ryu-O, Ryu-oh, Ryuuou; in Japanese: 龍王, 竜王, lit. "Dragon King") is a major title tournament of professional shogi and the name title awarded to its current holder. As of October 2026, the Ryūō title holder is Sōta Fujii.

The Ryūō Tournament (Ryūō-sen 竜王戦) is sponsored by the Yomiuri Shimbun. It is one of the eight major professional shogi title matches and was first held in 1988. Among the eight titles in the professional shogi titleholder system, Ryūō and Meijin are the most prestigious ones. However, the Ryūō title gives out the highest monetary prize—even more than the Meijin title. Cash prizes are ¥44,000,000 for the winner of championship and new Ryūō titleholder, and ¥16,500,000 for the loser. Additional compensation includes ¥14,500,000 for the previous titleholder and ¥7,000,000 for the challenger.

This title should not be confused with that of Amateur Ryūō which is awarded each year to the winner of the Amateur Ryūō Tournament.

== Name ==
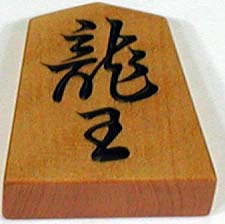
The dragon king

The basic meaning of ryūō is a "promoted rook". It can move as both a rook (hisha 飛車) and a silver (ginshō 銀将) during a turn and is one of the two most powerful pieces in shogi.

== Tournament structure ==
The tournament consists of six class tournaments and one ladder-format challenger tournament. All currently active professional shogi players as well as qualifying women's professionals, apprentice professionals and amateurs are assigned to one of six classes. There are roughly 16 players each in Class 1 to Class 3, 32 players in Class 4 and Class 5, and then all remaining players are assigned to Class 6. The top players in these class tournaments (the top five players from Class 1, the top two from Class 2, and the top player from Class 3, Class 4, Class 5 and Class 6) are then seeded into the challenger tournament. The two players advancing to the final of the challenger tournament play a three-game match to determine the overall winner. In the title match, the first player to win four out of seven championship games becomes the new titleholder.

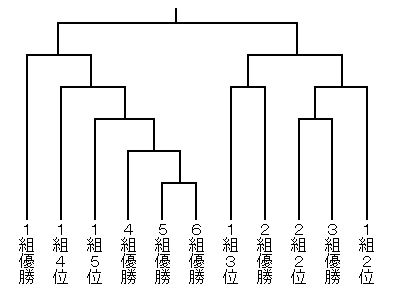
Current challenger tournament bracketing (from 2006)

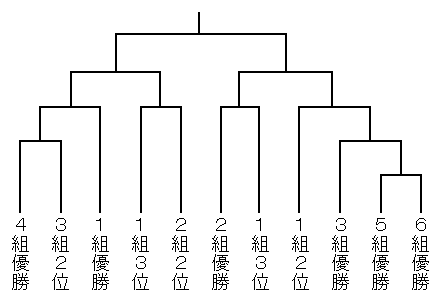
Previous challenger tournament structure 1989–2005

== History ==
The Ryūō is a continuation of the earlier Tenth Dan (十段戦 jū-dan sen) title tournament. The Tenth Dan (1962–1987) itself is a continuation of the Ninth Dan (九段戦, 1956–1961) and the earlier 全日本選手権戦 (1948–1955) tournaments, which were also sponsored by the same Yomiuri Shimbun. The 全日本選手権 tournament became a title tournament in 1950, where the title was known as the Ninth Dan (九段) title. (At this time, the highest dan rank in shogi was 8-dan unlike the current ranking system.) Considering this lineage, the Ryūō is second historical title and the longest running title tournament apart from the Meijin title.

== Lifetime Ryūō ==
"Lifetime Ryūō" (Eisei Ryūō) is the title awarded to a player who wins the championship five times in a row or seven times in total. Active players may qualify for this title, but it is only officially awarded upon their retirement or death.

Three players have qualified for the Lifetime Ryūō title: Akira Watanabe, Yoshiharu Habu and Sōta Fujii. Watanabe qualified for the title by winning his fifth championship in a row in 2008 (he has also won the title eleven times), whereas Habu qualified by winning his 7th title overall in 2017. Fujii qualified after winning his fifth championship in a row in 2025. The three will be officially designated Lifetime Ryūō upon retirement or death.

== Winners ==
The number in parentheses represents the cumulative times the player had won the title to date.

| No. | Year | Winner | Score | Opponent |
|---|---|---|---|---|
| 1 | 1988 | Akira Shima | 4-0 | Kunio Yonenaga |
| 2 | 1989 | Yoshiharu Habu | 4-3 | Akira Shima |
| 3 | 1990 | Koji Tanigawa | 4-1 | Yoshiharu Habu |
| 4 | 1991 | Koji Tanigawa (2) | 4-2 | Taku Morishita |
| 5 | 1992 | Yoshiharu Habu (2) | 4-3 | Koji Tanigawa |
| 6 | 1993 | Yasumitsu Sato | 4-2 | Yoshiharu Habu |
| 7 | 1994 | Yoshiharu Habu (3) | 4-2 | Yasumitsu Sato |
| 8 | 1995 | Yoshiharu Habu (4) | 4-2 | Yasumitsu Sato |
| 9 | 1996 | Koji Tanigawa (3) | 4-1 | Yoshiharu Habu |
| 10 | 1997 | Koji Tanigawa (4) | 4-0 | Keiichi Sanada |
| 11 | 1998 | Takeshi Fujii | 4-0 | Koji Tanigawa |
| 12 | 1999 | Takeshi Fujii (2) | 4-1 | Daisuke Suzuki |
| 13 | 2000 | Takeshi Fujii (3) | 4-3 | Yoshiharu Habu |
| 14 | 2001 | Yoshiharu Habu (5) | 4-1 | Takeshi Fujii |
| 15 | 2002 | Yoshiharu Habu (6) | 4-3 | Takashi Abe |
| 16 | 2003 | Toshiyuki Moriuchi | 4-0 | Yoshiharu Habu |
| 17 | 2004 | Akira Watanabe | 4-3 | Toshiyuki Moriuchi |
| 18 | 2005 | Akira Watanabe (2) | 4-0 | Kazuki Kimura |
| 19 | 2006 | Akira Watanabe (3) | 4-3 | Yasumitsu Sato |
| 20 | 2007 | Akira Watanabe (4) | 4-2 | Yasumitsu Sato |
| 21 | 2008 | Akira Watanabe (5) | 4-3 | Yoshiharu Habu |
| 22 | 2009 | Akira Watanabe (6) | 4-0 | Toshiyuki Moriuchi |
| 23 | 2010 | Akira Watanabe (7) | 4-2 | Yoshiharu Habu |
| 24 | 2011 | Akira Watanabe (8) | 4-1 | Tadahisa Maruyama |
| 25 | 2012 | Akira Watanabe (9) | 4-1 | Tadahisa Maruyama |
| 26 | 2013 | Toshiyuki Moriuchi (2) | 4-1 | Akira Watanabe |
| 27 | 2014 | Tetsurō Itodani | 4-1 | Toshiyuki Moriuchi |
| 28 | 2015 | Akira Watanabe (10) | 4-1 | Tetsurō Itodani |
| 29 | 2016 | Akira Watanabe (11) | 4-3 (Note: This 2016 tournament playoff was affected by the 29th Ryūō challenger controversy which prevented Hiroyuki Miura from challenging Watanabe.) | Tadahisa Maruyama |
| 30 | 2017 | Yoshiharu Habu (7) | 4-1 | Akira Watanabe |
| 31 | 2018 | Akihito Hirose | 4-3 | Yoshiharu Habu |
| 32 | 2019 | Masayuki Toyoshima | 4-1 | Akihito Hirose |
| 33 | 2020 | Masayuki Toyoshima (2) | 4-1 | Yoshiharu Habu |
| 34 | 2021 | Sōta Fujii | 4-0 | Masayuki Toyoshima |
| 35 | 2022 | Sōta Fujii (2) | 4-2 | Akihito Hirose |
| 36 | 2023 | Sōta Fujii (3) | 4-0 | Takumi Itō |
| 37 | 2024 | Sōta Fujii (4) | 4-2 | Yūki Sasaki |
| 38 | 2025 | Sōta Fujii (5) | 4-0 | Yūki Sasaki |

== Records ==
- Most titles overall: Akira Watanabe, 11
- Most consecutive titles: Akira Watanabe, 9 in a row (2004–2012)
- Most times recapturing title: Yoshiharu Habu, 4 (Note: Habu lost the title for first time in 1990, but won it back in 1992. He lost the title again in 1993, only to recapture it for the second time in 1994. He lost title for the third time in 1996, but recaptured it again five years later in 2001. He lost the title in 2003, but recaptured it for a fourth time in 2017.)
- Longest period between titles: Yoshiharu Habu, 15 years (2003–2017)
- Oldest person to win title: Yoshiharu Habu, 47 years and 2 months
- Youngest person to win title: Yoshiharu Habu, 19 years and 2 months.

== Games played outside Japan ==
The first game of each of the following Ryūō title matches was played outside of Japan.

| No. | Year | Location |
|---|---|---|
| 3 | 1990 | Frankfurt, Germany |
| 4 | 1991 | Bangkok, Thailand |
| 5 | 1992 | London, England |
| 6 | 1993 | Singapore |
| 7 | 1994 | Paris, France |
| 8 | 1995 | Beijing, China |
| 9 | 1996 | Los Angeles, United States |
| 10 | 1997 | Gold Coast, Australia |

| No. | Year | Location |
|---|---|---|
| 11 | 1998 | New York City, United States |
| 13 | 2000 | Shanghai, China |
| 15 | 2002 | Taipei, Taiwan |
| 17 | 2004 | Seoul, South Korea |
| 19 | 2006 | San Francisco, United States |
| 21 | 2008 | Paris, France |
| 27 | 2014 | Honolulu, United States |

== 29th Ryūō challenger controversy ==
Hiroyuki Miura won the three-game challenger playoff match for the 29th Ryūō tournament by defeating Tadahisa Maruyama two games to one in early September 2016. Three days before Miura was to begin play against reigning Ryūō Akira Watanabe, however, the Japan Shogi Association (JSA) announced that Maruyama was replacing Miura as the challenger. The official reason given by the JSA had to do with Miura failing to follow proper procedure in requesting to be allowed to withdraw from the match, but there also had been suspicions raised about Miura's recent frequent leaving of his seat during official shogi games. Suspicions had been raised that he was doing so to consult shogi software or an app installed on a smartphone. Miura denied the accusations at a meeting of the JSA managing directors on October 11, and said he was withdrawing from the upcoming title match because he could not play shogi under such circumstances. The JSA said that Miura failed to submit an official notification of withdrawal by the required deadline on October 12 and as a result Miura was suspended from official game play until December 31, 2016.

The JSA subsequently established an independent investigative panel at the end of October 2016 to determine whether Miura had actually done anything wrong and to evaluate the appropriateness of its response to the allegations. The panel held a press conference on December 26, 2016 to announce its findings. The panel found there was insufficient evidence to support the accusations of cheating made against Miura and that the claim that he had excessively left his seat during official games was false. Regarding the action taken by the JSA, the panel stated that it believed that the JSA response was appropriate given the circumstances since it had no real option other than to act the way it did. In response to the panel's report, both the JSA and Miura held separate press conferences. JSA president Koji Tanigawa apologized to Miura and announced he was being allowed to return to active status in January. Tanigawa also stated that he and three other executives of the JSA would have their salaries cut by 30% for a period of three months. Miura criticized the JSA in his press conference and stated that "he wonders why the association banned him from participating in the Ryu-oh championship match since there was no evidence of wrongdoing" and that "he wants things to be settled as soon as possible and that he will try hard to get back to his winning ways".

On January 18, 2017, Tanigawa announced that he was resigning as JSA president to assume responsibility for the JSA's handling of the matter. The following day, the resignations of Tanigawa and Akira Shima, the director in charge of the JSA's handling of the Miura allegations, were accepted at an emergency meeting of the JSA's board of directors.

On February 27, 2017, another emergency meeting of JSA professionals was held in response to a petition signed by 28 current and former professionals asking that the JSA remove five board members involved in the handling of the controversy. The meeting took place via teleconferencing at JSA offices in Tokyo and Osaka, and a vote was held to determine whether the five should be asked to step down. Out of the 234 voting members of the JSA, 216 votes (including 64 by written proxy) were cast and a majority voted for the dismissal of three of the five: Teruichi Aono, Daisuke Nakagawa and Daisuke Katagami.

On May 24, 2017, Miura and new JSA president Yasumitsu Satō held a joint press conference to announce that a settlement had been reached to resolve any outstanding issues between the two sides. Both sides acknowledged their acceptance of the findings in the independent investigative panel's report and expressed their desire to move on from the matter. It was also announced that the JSA agreed to pay Miura an undisclosed financial settlement to compensate him for not only lost game fees, but also for the mental anguish and damage caused to his reputation. Miura also announced that he met with Ryūō title holder Watanabe prior to the press conference and that he accepted Watanabe's apology for his role in the controversy.

== Players by Ryūō class ==
Below is a list of professional players grouped by their class for the 39th Ryūō league (2025–2026) including their dan ranking at the beginning of league play. In addition to the regular professional players, four women's professionals, one apprentice professional 3-dan, and three amateur players also were assigned to Class 6. Women's professional ranks are denoted by a "W" before a player's dan ranking.

38th Ryūō title holder
| Name | Dan | Other titles held at start of league play |
|---|---|---|
| Sōta Fujii | 9 | Kiō, Kisei, Meijin, Ōshō, and Ōza |

=== Class 1 ===
39th Ryūō Class 1
| Name | Dan | Titles held at start of league play |
|---|---|---|
| Wataru Yashiro | 8 | |
| Takuya Nagase | 9 | |
| Shintarō Saitō | 8 | |
| Akihito Hirose | 9 | |
| Toshiyuki Moriuchi | 9 | |
| Taichi Takami | 7 | |
| Akira Inaba | 8 | |
| Kazuki Kimura | 9 | |
| Ayumu Matsuo | 8 | |
| Hiroyuki Miura | 9 | |
| Yasumitsu Satō | 9 | |
| Tatsuya Sugai | 8 | |
| Masataka Gōda | 9 | |
| Takumi Itō | 9 | Eiō and Ōi |
| Yoshiharu Habu | 9 | |
| Yūki Sasaki | 8 | |

=== Class 2 ===
39th Ryūō Class 2
| Name | Dan |
|---|---|
| Toshiaki Kubo | 9 |
| Masayuki Toyoshima | 9 |
| Takeshi Fujii | 9 |
| Ryūma Tonari | 7 |
| Takashi Ikenaga | 6 |
| Daichi Sasaki | 7 |
| Shingo Sawada | 7 |
| Tadahisa Maruyama | 9 |
| Chikara Akutsu | 8 |
| Nobuyuki Yashiki | 9 |
| Kōichi Fukaura | 9 |
| Seiya Kondō | 8 |
| Amahiko Satō | 9 |
| Shin'ichirō Hattori | 7 |
| Takayuki Yamasaki | 9 |

=== Class 3 ===
39th Ryūō Class 3
| Name | Dan |
|---|---|
| Tetsurō Itodani | 8 |
| Takahiro Ōhashi | 7 |
| Daisuke Suzuki | 9 |
| Satoshi Takano | 7 |
| Takuma Oikawa | 7 |
| Mikio Kariyama | 5 |
| Tatsuya Sanmaidō | 7 |
| Kei Honda | 6 |
| Makoto Sasaki | 7 |
| Hisashi Namekata | 9 |
| Yasuhiro Masuda | 8 |
| Kentarō Ishii | 7 |
| Tadashi Ōishi | 7 |
| Mirai Aoshima | 7 |
| Naohiro Ishida | 6 |
| Kenjirō Abe | 7 |

=== Class 4 ===
39th Ryūō Class 4
| Name | Dan | Titles held at start of league play |
|---|---|---|
| Shōta Chida | 8 | |
| Reo Kurosawa | 6 | |
| Akihiro Ida | 5 | |
| Kōji Tanigawa | 9 | 17th Lifetime Meijin |
| Yasuaki Murayama | 8 | |
| Akihiro Takada | 5 | |
| Nagisa Fujimoto | 7 | |
| Shōgo Orita | 5 | |
| Hiromu Watanabe | 6 | |
| Akira Nishio | 7 | |
| Shin'ya Satō | 7 | |
| Michio Takahashi | 9 | |
| Hirotaka Nozuki | 8 | |
| Osamu Nakamura | 9 | |
| Eiji Iijima | 8 | |
| Hirotaka Kajiura | 7 | |
| Shūji Muranaka | 7 | |
| Issei Takazaki | 7 | |
| Kōta Kanai | 6 | |
| Kazuo Sugimoto | 6 | |
| Akihiro Murata | 6 | |
| Kazuki Yamashita | 4 | |
| Kazuhiro Nishikawa | 7 | |
| Yūta Ishikawa | 5 | |
| Shingo Itō | 6 | |
| Tadao Kitajima | 7 | |
| Hiroaki Yokoyama | 7 | |
| Kōhei Hasebe | 5 | |
| Makoto Tobe | 7 | |
| Kazushi Watanabe | 7 | |
| Kōru Abe | 7 | |
| Kazutoshi Satō | 7 | |

=== Class 5 ===
39th Ryūō Class 5
| Name | Dan |
|---|---|
| Atsushi Miyata | 7 |
| Hiroshi Yamamoto | 5 |
| Sakio Chiba | 7 |
| Junpei Ide | 5 |
| Asuto Saitō | 6 |
| Manabu Senzaki | 9 |
| Taichi Nakamura | 8 |
| Tetsuya Fujimori | 9 |
| Keita Kadokura | 6 |
| Wakamu Deguchi | 6 |
| Yūta Komori | 5 |
| Norihiro Yagura | 7 |
| Takashi Abe | 9 |
| Tomohiro Murata | 7 |
| Hirotoshi Ueno | 5 |
| Masataka Sugimoto | 8 |
| Hiroki Iizuka | 8 |
| Daisuke Nakagawa | 8 |
| Daisuke Katagami | 7 |
| Masakazu Watanabe | 6 |
| Hiroki Taniai | 5 |
| Yūsuke Tōyama | 6 |
| Kōsuke Tamura | 7 |
| Yoshitaka Hoshino | 5 |
| Satoru Sakaguchi | 6 |
| Kensuke Kitahama | 8 |
| Yūsei Koga | 6 |
| Yūgo Takeuchi | 5 |
| Kanta Masegi | 4 |
| Keita Inoue | 9 |
| Kōhei Funae | 7 |

=== Class 6 ===
39th Ryūō Class 6
| Name | Dan | Titles held at start of league play |
|---|---|---|
| Keiichi Sanada | 8 | |
| Hiroshi Okazaki | 7 | |
| Yasuaki Tsukada | 9 | |
| Ichirō Hiura | 8 | |
| Yoshiyuki Matsumoto | 7 | |
| Hisashi Ogura | 8 | |
| Tomoka Nishiyama | W5 | Women's Ōshō and Hakurei |
| Ehoto Osogaguchi | 4 | |
| Takehiro Ōhira | 6 | |
| Rikuto Kimoto | Amateur | |
| Shiryū Katayama | 4 | |
| Kenta Miyajima | 4 | |
| Taku Morishita | 9 | |
| Isao Nakata | 8 | |
| Kenji Waki | 9 | |
| Takuya Nishida | 6 | |
| Kenji Imaizumi | 5 | |
| Kazushiza Horiguchi | 8 | |
| Eisaku Tomioka | 9 | |
| Shōji Segawa | 6 | |
| Yūichi Tanaka | 8 | |
| Takahiro Toyokawa | 7 | |
| Kiyokazu Katsumata | 7 | |
| Toshifumi Arata | Amateur | |
| Yūki Saitō | 4 | |
| Kazuharu Shoshi | 7 | |
| Taiki Yamakawa | 7 | |
| Rintarō Iwamura | 4 | |
| Nanami Naka | W3 | |
| Kenji Kanzaki | 8 | |
| Takayuki Kuroda | 5 | |
| Masahiko Urano | 8 | |
| Naruyuki Hatakeyama | 8 | |
| Shin'ya Yamamoto | 8 | |
| Mamoru Hatakeyama | 8 | |
| Hiroshi Kobayashi | 8 | |
| Naoya Fujiwara | 7 | |
| Seiya Tomita | 5 | |
| Shingo Hirafuji | 7 | |
| Kenshi Tokuda | 4 | |
| Yūya Nagaoka | 6 | |
| Kana Fukuma | W6 | Women's Ōi|Kurashiki Tōka|Women's Ōza|Seirei|Jo-Ō, and Women's Meijin |
| Hiroto Ikegaki | 4 | |
| Yoshikazu Minami | 9 | |
| Ryō Shimamoto | 6 | |
| Satoshi Inaba | Amateur | |
| Toshiki Sumisaki | 4 | |
| Saito Morimoto | 4 | |
| Hiroshi Miyamoto | 6 | |
| Yūya Saitō | 4 | |
| Takanori An'yōji | 7 | |
| Mitsunori Makino | 6 | |
| Tomoki Yokoyama | 4 | |
| Akira Shima | 9 | |
| Shin'ichi Satō | 6 | |
| Hiroshi Kamiya | 8 | |
| Reo Koyama | 4 | |
| Ryōsuke Nakamura | 6 | |
| Yūjirō Takahashi | 4 | |
| Keigo Nakagawa | Amateur | |
| Naoki Iruma | A3 | |
| Shūji Satō | 8 | |
| Naoki Koyama | 4 | |
| Wataru Kamimura | 5 | |
| Ryūma Yoshiike | 4 | |
| Sae Itō | W4 | |
| Reo Okabe | 5 | |
| Hideyuki Takano | 7 | |
| Masakazu Kondō | 7 | |
| Yoshiyuki Kubota | 7 | |
