= Manabu Senzaki =

Japanese shogi player

- Native name: 先崎学
- Born: June 22, 1970 (age 54)
- Hometown: Aomori Prefecture

Career
- Achieved professional status: October 19, 1987 (aged 17)
- Badge Number: 185
- Rank: 9-dan
- Teacher: Kunio Yonenaga (9-dan)
- Tournaments won: 2
- Meijin class: C1
- Ryūō class: 5

Websites
- JSA profile page

Manabu Senzaki (先崎 学, Senzaki Manabu; born June 22, 1970) is a Japanese professional shogi player ranked 9-dan.

== Shogi professional ==
On February 7, 2013, Senzaki defeated Eiji Iijima in an Mejin League Class B2 game to become the 47th professional to win 600 official games.

=== Promotion history ===
The promotion history for Senzaki is as follows:

- 5-kyū: 1981
- 1-dan: 1985
- 4-dan: October 19, 1987
- 5-dan: October 8, 1990
- 6-dan: June 8, 1994
- 7-dan: April 1, 1999
- 8-dan: April 1, 2000
- 9-dan: April 1, 2014

=== Titles and other championships ===
Senzaki has yet to make an appearance in a major title match, but he has won two non-major shogi championships during his career: the NHK Cup in 1990 and the Young Lions in 1991.
