= Yoshiharu Habu =

Japanese shogi and chess player (born 1970)

- 羽生善治
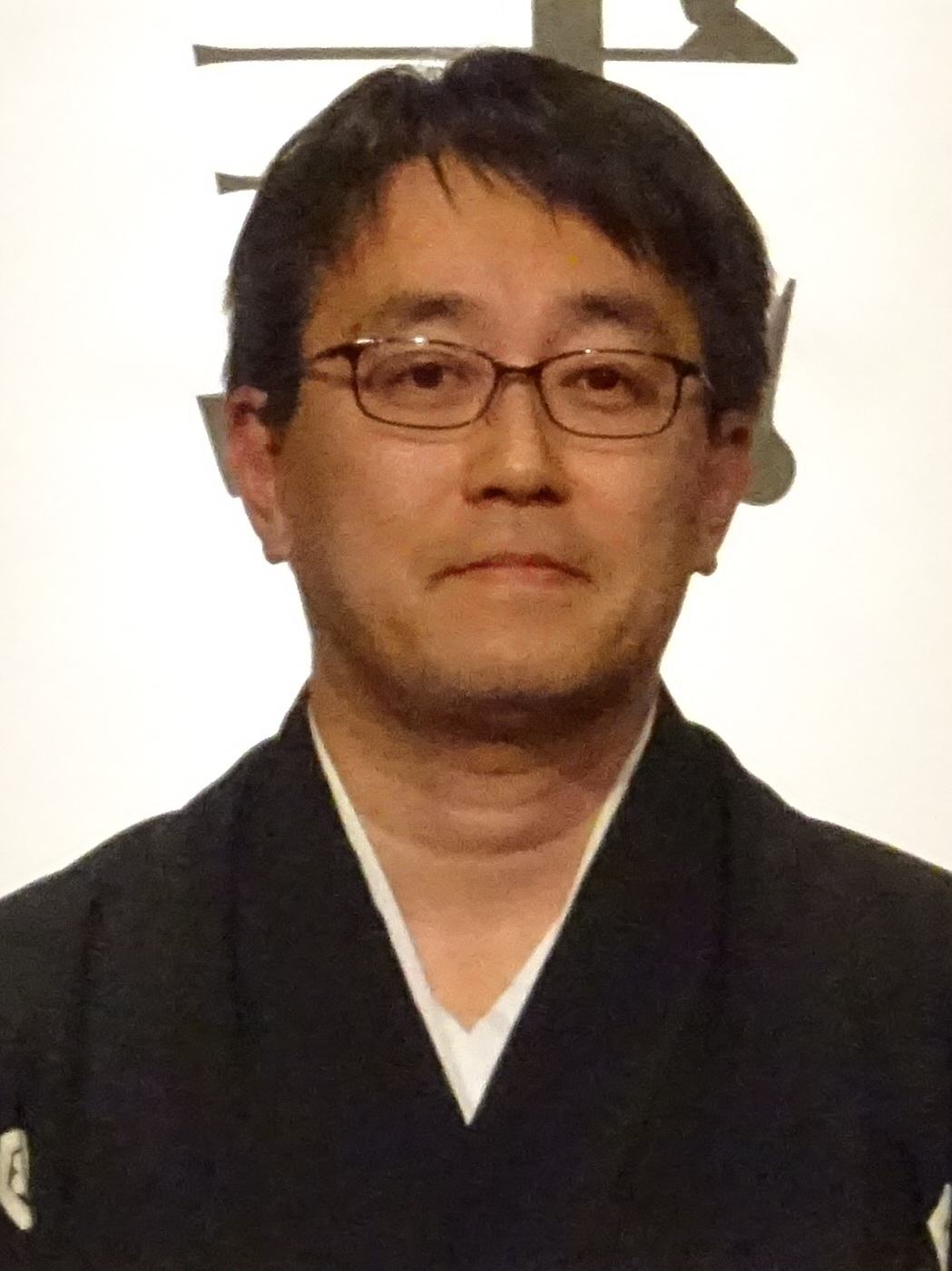
- Habu in 2018
- Born: September 27, 1970 (age 56); Tokorozawa, Saitama, Japan

Career
- Achieved professional status: December 18, 1985 (aged 15)
- Badge number: 175
- Rank: 9 dan
- Teacher: Tatsuya Futakami
- Lifetime titles: Lifetime Meijin; Lifetime Ryūō; Lifetime Kisei; Lifetime Ōi; Lifetime Ōza; Lifetime Kiō; Lifetime Ōshō
- Major titles won: 99
- Tournaments won: 45
- Meijin class: B2
- Ryūō class: 2

Websites
- JSA profile page
- Chess career
- Country: Japan
- Title: FIDE Master (2004)
- Peak rating: 2415 (February 2014)

Yoshiharu Habu (Japanese: 羽生 善治, Hepburn: Habu Yoshiharu; born September 27, 1970) is a professional shogi player and a chess FIDE Master. He is a former holder of the Ryūō, Meijin, Ōi, Ōza, Kiō, Ōshō and Kisei major titles. He was the first person to simultaneously hold seven major professional shogi titles at the same time and is the only person to qualify as a lifetime title holder for seven major titles. In January 2018, Habu became the first professional shogi player to be awarded Japan's People's Honour Award. Habu is also a former president of the Japan Shogi Association (JSA).

== Early life, amateur shogi and apprenticeship ==
Yoshiharu Habu was born in Tokorozawa, Saitama in 1970 and moved to Hachioji, Tokyo before entering kindergarten. Habu first encountered shogi in his first year of elementary school, when his classmates taught him how the shogi pieces move. He was so fascinated by the game that his mother entered him in a shogi tournament held at the Hachioji Shogi Club in the summer of 1978. Although Habu was eliminated during the preliminary rounds with a record of 1 win and 2 losses, his parents took him to the shogi club every weekend from October 1978. Habu improved so rapidly that he was promoted to amateur 5-dan in October 1981 at the age of eleven.

During his elementary school days, Habu regularly participated in regional and national shogi tournaments, mainly for children. At these tournaments, Habu played against several children of the same age who also became professional players, including Toshiyuki Moriuchi, Yasumitsu Satō and Manabu Senzaki. Those players born around 1970 are now known as the Habu generation, not just because they were born in the same year, but also due to their outstanding achievements as players.

In July 1981, Habu qualified to participate in the Amateur Meijin Tournament as the youngest ever representative ever of the Tokyo Suburban Area, and won four tournaments for elementary school children the following August. In April 1982, Habu won the 7th Elementary School Meijin tournament (小学生将棋名人戦, Shōgakusei shōgi meijinsen). He expressed his desire to become a professional player and asked advice from Katsuyasu Nakajima, the owner of the Hachioji Shogi Club and a student of Tatsuya Futakami. Habu applied for admission into the Japan Shogi Association's apprentice school as Futakami's student and was accepted as a member in 1982.

== Shogi professional ==
Habu became a 4-dan professional in 1985 at the age of 14. He was the third junior high school kid professional in shogi history following Hifumi Kato and Koji Tanigawa. In 1989, at the age of 19, Habu 6-dan won the Ryūō championship, defeating Akira Shima who led a 4-person shogi study group "Shimaken" in which Habu himself took part. This was the first time Habu won one of the seven major titles making him, at the time, the youngest titleholder ever. Although he lost the Ryūō title to Tanigawa the following year, Habu won the Kiō championship four months later in 1991. Since then he has held at least one of the seven major titles every year since then, and according to custom of the titleholder system he has, therefore, never been referred to by his dan ranking since winning that first championship in 1989.

Accumulating three wins in major championships (Ryūō in 1989, Kiō in 1991 and 1992), Habu actually did qualify for promotion to 9-dan in March 1992, but the existing promotion rules required him to be promoted to 8-dan first and then to wait one year before his next promotion. He was officially promoted to 9-dan on April 1, 1994.

In 1992 Habu won the Ōza championship defeating Bungo Fukusaki to hold two titles (Kiō and Ōza) simultaneously. He went on to hold the Ōza title for 19 terms in a row. In 1996 (February 14 to July 30), Habu became the first professional to ever hold seven major titles (Meijin, Ryūō, Kisei, Ōi, Ōza, Kiō, and Ōshō) at the same time. (Note: There were only seven major titles up until 2017. The eighth major title the Eiō was upgraded to major title status in May 2017)

In July 2012, Habu won his 81st shogi title overall when he won in the Kisei title, becoming 1st on the all-time title-winners list, and surpassing the 80 of Yasuharu Ōyama.

In June 2014, Habu defeated the defending Meijin Toshiyuki Moriuchi 4 games to none to become the 72nd Meijin. Habu lost his Meijin title to Moriuchi in 2011 (69th Meijin match) and was unable to defeat Moriuchi and regain the title in both 2012 (70th Meijin match) and 2013 (71st Meijin match). By defeating Moriuchi, Habu not only moved into a tie with both Moriuchi and Yoshio Kimura for third place on the all time Meijin winner's list, he also became the first person the recapture the title for the third time.

In November 2014, Habu won his 1300 official game, becoming the fourth player to do so, the youngest player to do so (44 years and 1 month) and the fastest player to do since turning professional (28 years and 11 months). Habu's win came in his 1801 game as a professional and his winning percentage of 72.3 percent at the time is the all-time highest of any professional player to reach 1300 wins to date.

In December 2017, Habu defeated defending champion Akira Watanabe to win the 30th Ryūō title. It was Habu's seventh Ryūō title overall which qualified him for the title of Lifetime Ryūō. It also made Habu the first shogi professional to qualify for lifetime titles in seven major titles.

On January 5, 2018, Habu became the first shogi professional to be awarded Japan's People's Honor Award. In November 2018, it was announced that he was also awarded the Medal with Purple Ribbon.

On November 21, 2018, Habu became the seventh shogi professional to play 2000 official games. At age 48 years and 1 month, Habu is the youngest to achieve the feat. He also accomplished it in 32 years and 11 months since obtaining professional status, thus becoming the fastest to do so. Furthermore, his overall winning percentage of .709 is also the highest among those who have previously reached the milestone.

On December 21, 2018, Habu lost the 31st Ryūō title to challenger Akihito Hirose 4 games to 3. The loss of the Ryūō title marked the first time in 27 years that Habu was a not one of professional shogi's major titleholders. A few days after losing the Ryūō title, the Japan Shogi Association announced that Habu had expressed his desire to be officially referred to as "Habu 9-dan" (羽生九段 (Habu Kudan)) instead of as "Ex-Ryūō Habu" (羽生前竜王 (Habu Zenryūō)), the way Ex-Ryūō champions can choose to be referred to as throughout the year following their loss of the title.

Habu defeated Masataka Gōda on March 17, 2019, to win the 68th NHK Cup tournament. It was the eleventh time Habu won the tournament, and also the 45th non-major title championship of his career, which broke the previous record of forty-four championships he shared with Ōyama.

On June 4, 2019, Habu defeated Takuya Nagase to become the shogi professional with the most victories of all time with 1,434 wins. Habu tied Ōyama's record of 1433 career wins a little over a week earlier on May 23, but then lost his next game and his first chance to break the tie on May 30. Habu's 1,434 win came in his 2,027 game as a shogi professional and gave him an overall winning percentage of 0.708.

In 2022, Habu was demoted to B1 class after 29 consecutive terms ranked A class or higher. On June 16, 2022, in the first round of the 81st Meijin B1 ranking league, Habu defeated Takayuki Yamasaki to become the first shogi professional with 1,500 wins, extending his record for most wins by a shogi professional and giving him an overall winning percentage of 0.696. For this achievement, Habu was awarded the newly created Special Shogi Honor Fighting Spirit Award.

Habu won all six of his games in the 72nd Ōshō Challenger League (September – November 2022) to earn the right to challenge Sōta Fujii for the later's Osho title in the 72nd Ōshō title match (January – March 2023). It was the first meeting between the two in a major title match. The match was tied at two wins apiece after four games, but Fujii won the next two games to win the match 4 games to 2.

On November 26, 2025, Habu defeated Shōta Chida in a 19th Asahi Cup Open game to become the first professional shogi player to win 1600 official games. Habu's official win-loss record at the time was 1600 wins and 731 losses for a winning percentage of 0.686.

=== Playing style ===
Habu is an outstanding player of Static Rook strategies in both attack and defense, whether in early fight or slow game circumstances, but has also used Ranging Rook openings on occasion. Shogi professional Kiyokazu Katsumata has described Habu's as "a man who plays by applying the strong points of successive great masters as the circumstances demand, a man who combines all of the virtues of all the great masters".

Habu's favorite piece is the silver, which he finds vital for both attack and defense. His winning percentage when dropping golds and silvers on the squares 23 and 83 (or at 87 and 27 when playing White) is said to be high even though winning after such drops is generally considered to be quite difficult. For this reason, these squares are referred to by some in the shogi world as "Habu's zone".

He is well known for playing superb moves in disadvantageous positions in the endgame, with peculiar brinkmate sequences that other players seem unable to come up with, a characteristic that many young players called "Habu's magic", a label under which he has published a series of books.

His long time rival Toshiyuki Moriuchi said of him: "His greatness lies in that as those around him get stronger, he also gets stronger. He is completely obsessed with not letting there be any big difference in playing strength between himself and other shogi professionals."

=== Promotion history ===
The promotion history of Habu is as follows:

- 6-kyu: December 2, 1982
- 5-kyu: February 2, 1983 (6 wins, 3 losses)
- 4-kyu: March 28, 1983 (6 wins, no losses)
- 3-kyu: May 11, 1983 (6 wins, no losses)
- 2-kyu: July 7, 1983 (6 wins, no losses)
- 1-kyu: August 24, 1983 (6 wins, no losses)
- 1-dan: January 11, 1984 (12 wins, 4 losses)
- 2-dan: September 10, 1984 (14 wins, 5 losses)
- 3-dan: April 25, 1985 (12 wins, 4 losses)
- 4-dan: December 12, 1985 (13 wins, 4 losses)
- 5-dan: April 1, 1988 (for being promoted to Class C1 of Meijin ranking leagues)
- 6-dan: October 1, 1989 (for being the Ryu-oh challenger)
- 7-dan: October 1, 1990 (for being the Ryu-oh title holder, but needed to wait one year after 6-dan promotion)
- 8-dan: April 1, 1993 (for being promoted to Class A of the Meijin ranking leagues)
- 9-dan: April 1, 1994 (Qualified for rank in 1993 after holding a major title for three periods (years), but needed to wait one year after of 8-dan promotion before promoted to 9-dan)

=== Major titles and other championships ===
==== Major titles ====
There are eight major titles in shogi. Below is a list of number of times and years Habu has won each title.

Title	Years	Number of times overall
Ryūō	1989, 1992, 1994–95, 2001–02, 2017	7
Meijin	1994–96, 2003, 2008–10, 2014–15	9
Kisei (Note: The Kisei tournament was held twice a year until 1994. Habu won both times the tournament was held in 1993 and 1994.)	1993–95, 2000, 2008–2017	16
Ōi	1993–2001, 2004–06, 2011–16	18
Ōza	1992–2010, 2012–16	24
Kiō	1991–2002, 2005	13
Ōshō	1996–2001, 2003, 2005–09	12

- Lifetime titles (qualified for, but awarded upon retirement or death): Lifetime Meijin, Lifetime Ryūō, Lifetime Kisei, Lifetime Ōi, Lifetime Ōza, Lifetime Kiō, Lifetime Ōshō. As a result of having qualified as Lifetime title holder for seven titles, Habu may be referred to as "Lifetime Seven Crown" (永世七冠 (Eisei Nanakan)) upon retirement.
- Holds the record number of title match victories for the following titles: Kisei (tied with Ōyama and Nakahara), Ōi, Ōza, Kiō
- Holds the record number of consecutive title match victories for the following titles: Kisei, Ōza, Kiō

==== Other tournaments ====
In addition to major titles, Habu has won the following non-title tournaments.

Tournament	Years	Number of times
Tatsujin-sen	2011–12	2
Asahi Cup Open	2009, 2011, 2013–15	5
^{*}Asahi Open	2003–06	4
^{*}All Nihon Pro	1989, 1991, 1997	3
Ginga Tournament	1997–98, 2000–01, 2004, 2006, 2012	7
NHK Cup	1989, 1992, 1997–99, 2001, 2008–11, 2018	11
^{*}Hayazashi Senshuken	1992, 1995, 2002	3
Nihon Series	1991, 1998, 2003, 2010–11	5
Shinjin-Oh	1988	1
^{*}All Star Kachinuki-sen	1988, 1990, 1997, 1999	4
^{*}Tenno-sen	1987–88	2
^{*}Young Lions	1987, 1989	2

Lifetime titles: Lifetime NHK Cup Champion

Note: Tournaments marked with an asterisk (*) are no longer held.

=== Awards ===
Habu has received the following awards in recognition of his accomplishments throughout his career. The Annual Shogi Awards are awarded by the Japan Shogi Association to its members each year in recognition of performance during official play throughout the previous professional shogi year or shogi"nendo" (年度) (April 1 to March 31). "Other awards" includes those awarded by the JSA for career accomplishments and those awarded governmental organizations, etc. for contributions made to Japanese society.

==== Annual Shogi Awards ====
- 14th Annual Awards (April 1986 — March 1987): Best Winning Percentage, Best New Player
- 15th Annual Awards (April 1987 — March 1988): Best Winning Percentage, Most Games Won, Fighting-spirit
- 16th Annual Awards (April 1988 — March 1989): Player of the Year, Best Winning Percentage, Most Games Won, Most Games Played, Most Consecutive Games Won
- 17th Annual Awards (April 1989 — March 1990): Player of the Year, Best Winning Percentage, Most Games Won, Most Games Played, Most Consecutive Games Won
- 19th Annual Awards (April 1991 — March 1992): Fighting-spirit
- 20th Annual Awards (April 1992 — March 1993): Player of the Year, Best Winning Percentage, Most Games Won, Most Games Played, Most Consecutive Games Won
- 21st Annual Awards (April 1993 — March 1994): Player of the Year
- 22nd Annual Awards (April 1994 — March 1995): Player of the Year, Most Games Won
- 23rd Annual Awards (April 1995 — March 1996): Player of the Year, Best Winning Percentage, Most Games Won, Special Award
- 24th Annual Awards (April 1996 — March 1997): Player of the Year
- 26th Annual Awards (April 1998 — March 1999): Player of the Year, Most Games Played
- 27th Annual Awards (April 1999 — March 2000): Player of the Year
- 28th Annual Awards (April 2000 — March 2001): Player of the Year, Best Winning Percentage, Most Games Won, Most Games Played, Most Consecutive Games Won
- 29th Annual Awards (April 2001 — March 2002): Player of the Year
- 30th Annual Awards (April 2002 — March 2003): Player of the Year, Most Games Won, Most Games Played
- 32nd Annual Awards (April 2004 — March 2005): Player of the Year, Most Games Won, Most Games Played
- 33rd Annual Awards (April 2005 — March 2006): Player of the Year, Most Games Played, Most Consecutive Games Won
- 34th Annual Awards (April 2006 — March 2007): Excellent Player, Game of the Year
- 35th Annual Awards (April 2007 — March 2008): Player of the Year, Most Games Won, Most Games Played, Game of the Year
- 36th Annual Awards (April 2008 — March 2009): Player of the Year, Game of the Year
- 37th Annual Awards (April 2009 — March 2010): Player of the Year
- 38th Annual Awards (April 2010 — March 2011): Player of the Year, Most Games Won
- 39th Annual Awards (April 2011 — March 2012): Player of the Year, Most Games Won, Most Games Played
- 40th Annual Awards (April 2012 — March 2013): Excellent Player, Most Games Won, Most Games Played, Game of the Year, Special Award
- 41st Annual Awards (April 2013 — March 2014): Excellent Player, Most Games Won, Most Games Played, Game of the Year
- 42nd Annual Awards (April 2014 — March 2015): Player of the Year, Game of the Year
- 43rd Annual Awards (April 2015 — March 2016): Player of the Year, Special Game of the Year
- 44th Annual Awards (April 2016 — March 2017): Excellent Player
- 45th Annual Shogi Awards (April 2017 — March 2018): Player of the Year, Game of the Year
- 46th Annual Shogi Awards (April 2018 – March 2019): Game of the Year
- 50th Annual Shogi Awards (April 2022 – March 2023): Fighting-spirit, Game of the Year

==== Other awards ====
- 1994: Tokyo Resident Culture Honor Award (Awarded by the Governor of Tokyo in recognition of cultural achievements by a Tokyoite)
- 1996: Prime Minister's Award (Awarded by then Japanese Prime Minister Ryūtarō Hashimoto in recognition of becoming the first person to hold all seven major shogi titles at the same time.
- 1999: Shogi Honor Award (Awarded by the JSA in recognition of winning 600 official games as a professional)
- 2003: Shogi Honor Fighting-spirit Award (Awarded by JSA in recognition of winning 800 official games as a professional)
- 2007: Special Shogi Honor Award (Awarded by the JSA in recognition of winning 1,000 official games as a professional)
- 2008: 56th Kikuchi Kan Prize (Awarded by the publishing company Bungei Shunju in recognition of cultural achievements)
- 2010: 25 Years Service Award (Awarded by the JSA in recognition of being an active professional for twenty-five years)
- 2018: People's Honor Award
- 2018: Medal with Purple Ribbon
- 2022: Special Shogi Honor Fighting Spirit Award (Awarded by JSA in recognition of winning 1,500 official games as a professional)

=== Year-end shogi prize money rankings ===
Since 1993, Habu has finished at the top of the year-end prize money rankings a total of 24 times (1993–96, 1998–2012, 2014–16, 2018), second twice (1997 and 2013), third once (2017), fifth three times (2019, 2021 and 2023), sixth once (2020), ninth once (2025) and tenth once (2024). All amounts are given in Japanese yen and consist of tournament winnings and other game fees received during the calendar year (January 1 to December 31). Habu did not finish in the Top Ten in 2022, marking the first time he did not do so since 1993.

- 1993: ¥100,630,000
- 1994: ¥112,970,000
- 1995: ¥165,970,000
- 1996: ¥161,450,000
- 1997: ¥101,820,000
- 1998: ¥114,660,000
- 1999: ¥78,720,000
- 2000: ¥105,950,000
- 2001: ¥115,190,000
- 2002: ¥110,480,000
- 2003: ¥129,100,000
- 2004: ¥112,720,000
- 2005: ¥103,910,000
- 2006: ¥93,760,000
- 2007: ¥81,320,000
- 2008: ¥107,110,000
- 2009: ¥112,780,000
- 2010: ¥115,760,000
- 2011: ¥98,860,000
- 2012: ¥91,750,000
- 2013: ¥72,810,000
- 2014: ¥114,990,000
- 2015: ¥119,000,000
- 2016: ¥91,500,000
- 2017: ¥50,070,000
- 2018: ¥75,520,000
- 2019: ¥39,990,000
- 2020: ¥24,910,000
- 2021: ¥32,360,000
- 2023: ¥26,040,000
- 2024: ¥16,220,000
- 2025: ¥15,030,000

== JSA president ==
On April 4, 2023, then JSA president Satō announced that he would not seek re-election when his term expired in at the beginning of June 2023. Later that same day, Habu released a statement through the JSA stating that he had submitted his application to be a candidate for the JSA board of directors scheduled to be selected at the next general meeting in June 2023. In the statement, Habu also stated that he decided to be a candidate for the first time because he wanted to "do all he could to help the JSA as it prepared to celebrate its 100th anniversary in 2024". Habu's candidacy was approved by the board of directors election preparatory committee on April 26, and he was formally elected to the JSA board of directors and then subsequently selected to be JSA president by the other members of the board at the 74th JSA general meeting held on June 9, 2023.

On April 1, 2025, Habu made it clear that he had decided to not seek re-election as JSA president when his term ended in June 2025. He stated that he accomplished what he set out to do during the previous two years regarding the opening of the JSA's new headquarters in Tokyo and new branch office in Kansai as well as its 100th anniversary celebrations, but now he wants to just focus on playing shogi.

== Chess professional ==
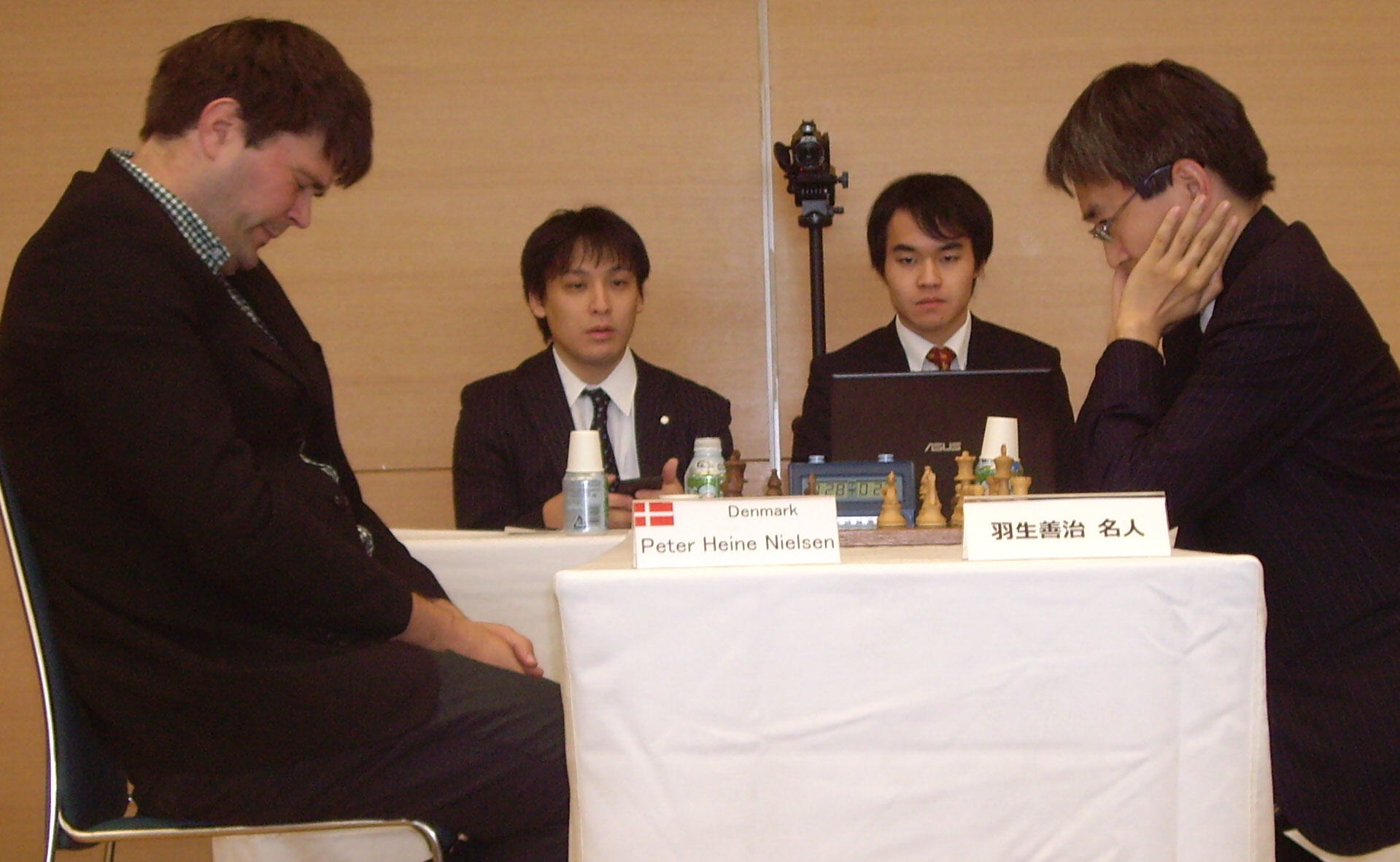
Habu playing chess with Peter Heine Nielsen (2014)

Habu is also one of the best chess players in Japan. He achieved the title of FIDE Master in 2004, and had a peak Elo rating of 2415 in February 2014.

In November 2014, he played former World Chess Champion Garry Kasparov in an exhibition match sponsored by the Japanese company Dwango. The two played two 25-minute rapid games with Habu losing both.

== Personal life ==
In March 1996, Habu married actress and singer Rie Hatada at Hato no Mori Hachiman Shrine in Sendagaya, Tokyo, not far from the head office of the Japan Shogi Association. The two had met for the first time in September 1994 and officially announced their engagement in July 1995. It was reported that 80 police officers were assigned to the ceremony due to the popularity of the two. As of 2012, they have two daughters.

== Publications ==
Habu has written numerous books, articles, etc. on shogi and various other topics. The vast majority of these are in Japanese, but there are some written in English.

- — (1992–1994). Habu no Zunō Shirīzu 羽生の頭脳シリーズ [Habu's Brain (Series)]. 10 volumes (in Japanese). Tokyo, Japan: 日本将棋連盟 (Nihon Shōgi Renmei; Japan Shogi Association).
- — (2000). Habu's Words. Translated by Tony Hosking; Yamato Takahashi [in Japanese]. Stratford-upon-Avon, England: The Shogi Foundation. ISBN 978-0953108923.
- — (2006). "Forward". Classic Shogi: Games Collection. By Hosking, Tony. Stratford-upon-Avon, England: The Shogi Foundation. ISBN 978-0953108930.
- —; Hosking, Tony (2010). Masters of Shogi. Stratford-upon-Avon, England: The Shogi Foundation. ISBN 978-0953108947.

== Video games ==
- Habu Meijin no Omoshiro Shōgi - Super Famicom video game
- Saikyō Habu Shōgi - Nintendo 64 video game
- Habu Yoshiharu Shogi de Kitaeru: Ketsudanryoku DS - Nintendo DS video game
- i HABU Shogi - iPhone/iPod
