= Akira Inaba =

Japanese shogi player (born 1988)

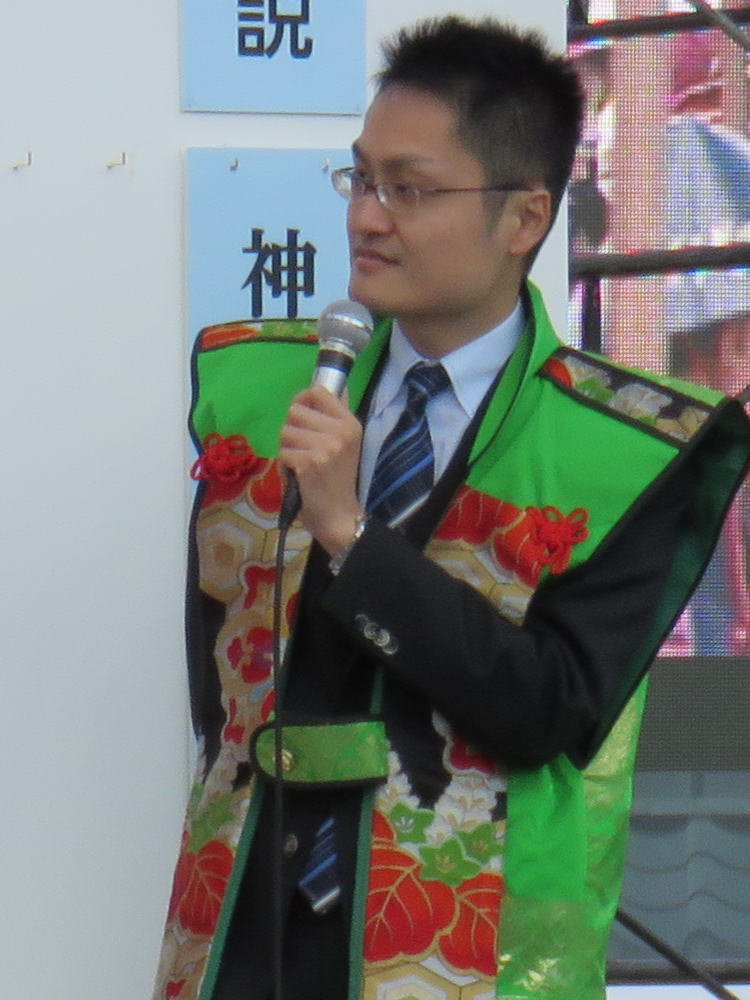
- Inaba at a human shogi event in November 2015.
- Native name: 稲葉陽
- Born: August 8, 1988 (age 38)
- Hometown: Nishinomiya

Career
- Achieved professional status: April 1, 2008 (aged 19)
- Badge number: 269
- Rank: 8-dan
- Teacher: Keita Inoue
- Tournaments won: 2
- Meijin class: B1
- Ryūō class: 2

Websites
- JSA profile page

Akira Inaba (稲葉 陽, Inaba Akira; born August 8, 1988) is a Japanese professional shogi player ranked 8-dan.

== Shogi professional ==
Inaba, together with Tetsurō Itodani, Masayuki Toyoshima and Akihiro Murata, is one of four Kansai-based young shogi professionals who are collectively referred to as the "Young Kansai Big Four" (関西若手四天王 Kansai Wakate Shitennō).

=== Promotion history ===
Inaba's promotion history is as follows:

- 6-kyū: September 2000
- 4-dan: April 1, 2008
- 5-dan: March 8, 2011
- 6-dan: May 1, 2012
- 7-dan: August 16, 2013
- 8-dan: February 18, 2016

=== Titles and other championships ===
Inaba has appeared in a major title match only once: he was the challenger for the Meijin title in 2017. He earned the right to challenge Amahiko Satō for the title by winning the 2016-2017 Class A ranking tournament with a record of 8 wins and 1 loss, thus becoming the eighth player in history to win the right to challenge for the Meijin title in his first year in Class A.

Inaba has won two non-major title championships: the 21st Ginga Tournament in 2013, and the 70th NHK Cup tournament in 2021.

=== Year-end prize money and game fee ranking ===
Inaba has finished in the "Top 10" of the JSA's year-end prize money and game fee rankings four times: 6th with JPY 28,010,000 in earnings in 2017; 9th with JPY 17,030,000 in earnings in 2021; 10th with JPY 15,800,000 in earnings in 2022, and 9th with JPY 17,810,000 in earnings in 2023.
