= Hifumi Katō =

Japanese shogi player (1940–2026)

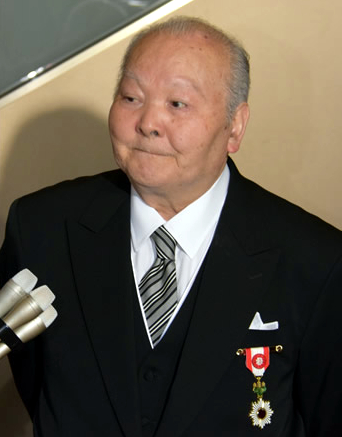
- Katō after receiving the Order of the Rising Sun, Gold Rays with Rosette in 2018
- Native name: 加藤一二三
- Born: January 1, 1940
- Hometown: Kama, Fukuoka, Japan
- Died: January 22, 2026 (aged 86)

Career
- Achieved professional status: August 1, 1954 (aged 14)
- Badge number: 64
- Rank: 9-dan (awarded the rank of Honorary 10-dan posthumously)
- Retired: June 20, 2017 (aged 77)
- Teacher: Shōji Kenmochi (9-dan)
- Major titles won: 8
- Tournaments won: 23
- Career record: 1324–1180 (.529)

Websites
- JSA profile page

Hifumi Katō (加藤 一二三, Katō Hifumi; January 1, 1940 – January 22, 2026) was a Japanese professional shogi player who achieved the rank of 9-dan. During his career, he won the Meijin, Tenth Dan, Ōi, Kiō and Ōshō major titles. He also held the record for being the youngest to have been awarded regular professional status at age 14 years and 7 months until Sōta Fujii broke it at age 14 years and 2 months in 2016. (Note: Aya Fujita is the youngest to have been awarded women's professional status at age 11 years 6 months.)

Since his given name is written using the kanji characters for the numbers "one","two" and "three", (Note: 一, hi, 二, fu and 三, mi, the kun'yomi readings for "one', 'two', and 'three' respectively.) Katō was known to his fans by the nickname "Hifumin" (ひふみん).

== Shogi professional ==
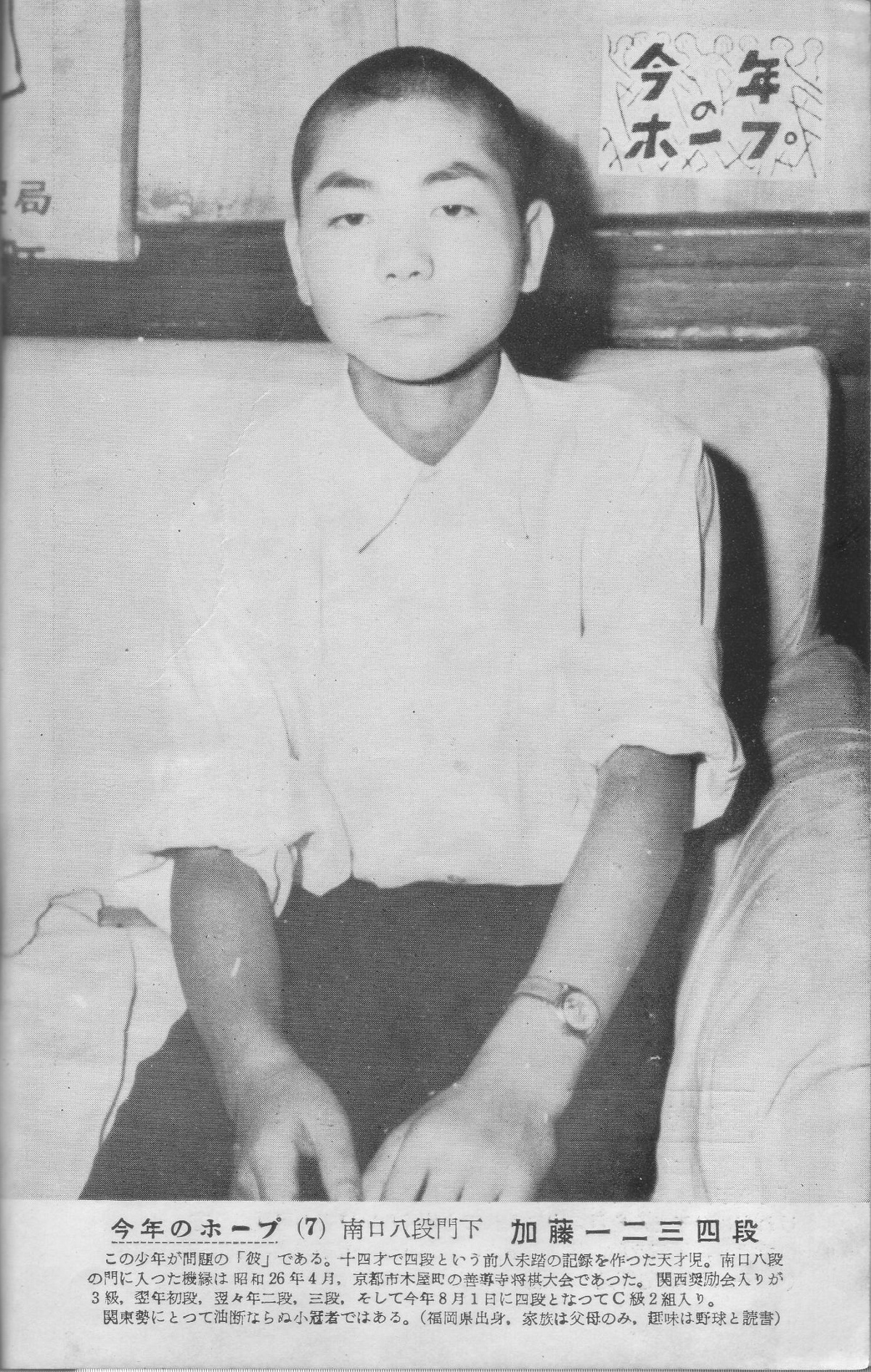
Katō in 1954 when he became a professional 4-dan.

=== Playing style ===
Katō was known for playing aggressive Climbing Silver strategies. He received a Masuda Special Award in 2017 for his innovations to this strategy over his career.

Katō's Double Fortress
☖ pieces in hand: –

9	8	7	6	5	4	3	2	1
香	桂						桂	香	1
	飛		銀			金	王		2
歩			歩		金	銀	歩	歩	3
		歩	角	歩	歩	歩			4
	歩								5
		歩	歩	歩		歩	歩	歩	6
歩	歩	銀	金		歩	銀			7
	玉	金	角				飛		8
香	桂						桂	香	9

☗ pieces in hand: –

Additionally, the Katō variation (加藤流 katō-ryū) of the Double Fortress opening is named after him.

=== Promotion history ===
Katō's promotion history is as follows:

- 3-kyū: 1951
- 1-dan: 1953
- 4-dan: August 1, 1954
- 5-dan: April 1, 1955
- 6-dan: April 1, 1956
- 7-dan: April 1, 1957
- 8-dan: April 1, 1958
- 9-dan: November 3, 1973
- Retired: June 20, 2017
- Honorary 10-dan: June 6, 2026 (posthumous)

=== Titles and other championships ===
Katō appeared in major title matches a total of twenty-four times, and won a total of eight titles. In addition to major titles, Katō won twenty-three other shogi championships during his career.

==== Major titles ====
Title	Years	Number of times overall
Meijin	1982	1
^{*}Tenth Dan (Note: The Tenth Dan major title became the Ryūō title in 1987)	1968, 1980–81	3
Ōi	1984	1
Kiō	1976–77	2
Ōshō	1978	1

Note: Tournaments marked with an asterisk (*) are no longer held.

==== Other championships ====
Tournament	Years	Number of times
Ōza (Note: The Ōza tournament was upgraded to major title status in 1982.)	1962	1
NHK Cup	1960, 1966, 1971, 1973, 1976, 1981, 1993	7
^{*}Hayazashi Senshuken	1977, 1981, 1990	3
JT Nihon Series	1983, 1987	2
^{*}Tennō-sen	1985	1
^{*}Meishō-sen	1982	1
Prince Takamatsu Award Shogi Tournament	1956, 1964, 1966	3
^{*}Japan No.1 Cup Tournament	1958, 1960	2
^{*}6-dan, 5-dan, 4-dan tournament	1955	1
^{*}Hayazashi Ōi Ketteisen	1959	1
Other		1

Note: Tournaments marked with an asterisk (*) are no longer held.

== Personal life and death ==
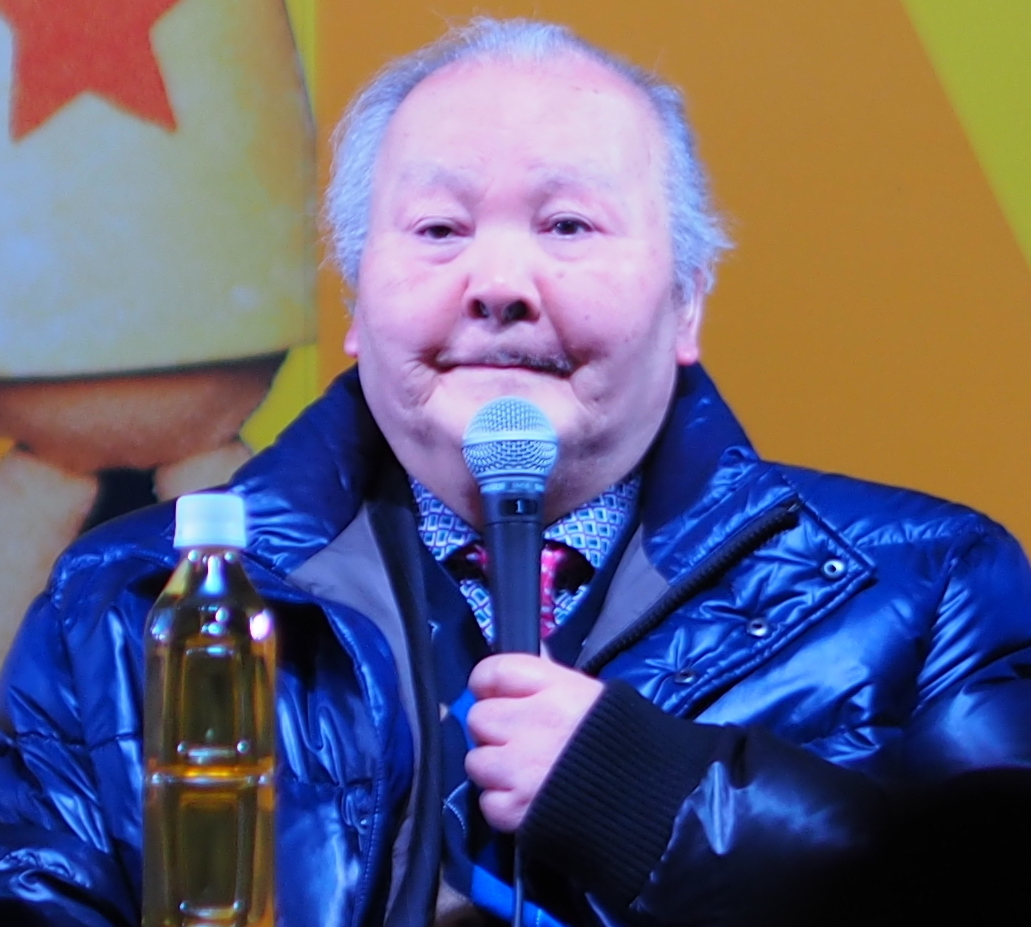
Katō at the Ohi Racecourse on December 27, 2018

Katō was baptized as a Catholic in 1970, and his Christian name was Paul. He was made a Knight of the Order of St. Sylvester by Pope John Paul II in 1986.

Katō died on January 22, 2026, at the age of 86.

== Awards and honors ==
Katō received numerous awards and honors throughout his career for his accomplishments both on and off the shogi board. These include the Annual Shogi Awards given out by the JSA for performance in official games and other awards given out by governmental organizations, etc. for contributions made to Japanese society.

=== Annual shogi awards ===
- 4th Annual Awards (April 1976 – March 1977): Most Games Won, Most Consecutive Games Won, Technique Award
- 5th Annual Awards (April 1977 – March 1978): Distinguished Service Award
- 6th Annual Awards (April 1978 – March 1979): Distinguished Service Award
- 8th Annual Awards (April 1980 – March 1981): Distinguished Service Award
- 9th Annual Awards (April 1981 – March 1982): Player of the Year, Most Consecutive Games Won
- 12th Annual Awards (April 1984 – March 1985): Most Games Won, Most Games Played
- 29th Annual Awards (April 2001 – March 2002): Tokyo Press Club Award
- 44th Annual Awards (April 2016 – March 2017): Special Award, Kōzō Masuda Award Special Prize

=== Other awards ===
- 1977: Shogi Honor Fighting-spirit Award (Awarded by JSA in recognition of winning 600 official games as a professional)
- 1978: 25 Years Service Award (Awarded by the JSA in recognition of being an active professional for twenty-five years)
- 1982: Shogi Honor Fighting-spirit Award (Awarded by JSA in recognition of winning 800 official games as a professional)
- 1986: Knight of the Order of St. Sylvester
- 1989: Special Shogi Honor Award (Awarded by the JSA in recognition of winning 1,000 official games as a professional)
- 1993: 40 Years Service Award (Awarded by the JSA in recognition of being an active professional for forty years)
- 2000: Medal with Purple Ribbon
- 2001: 1200 Wins Award (Awarded by the JSA in recognition of winning 1,200 official games as a professional)
- 2003: 50 Years Service Award (Awarded by the JSA in recognition of being an active professional for fifty years)
- 2022: Person of Cultural Merit
