= Meijin (shogi) =

One of the eight titles in Japanese professional shogi

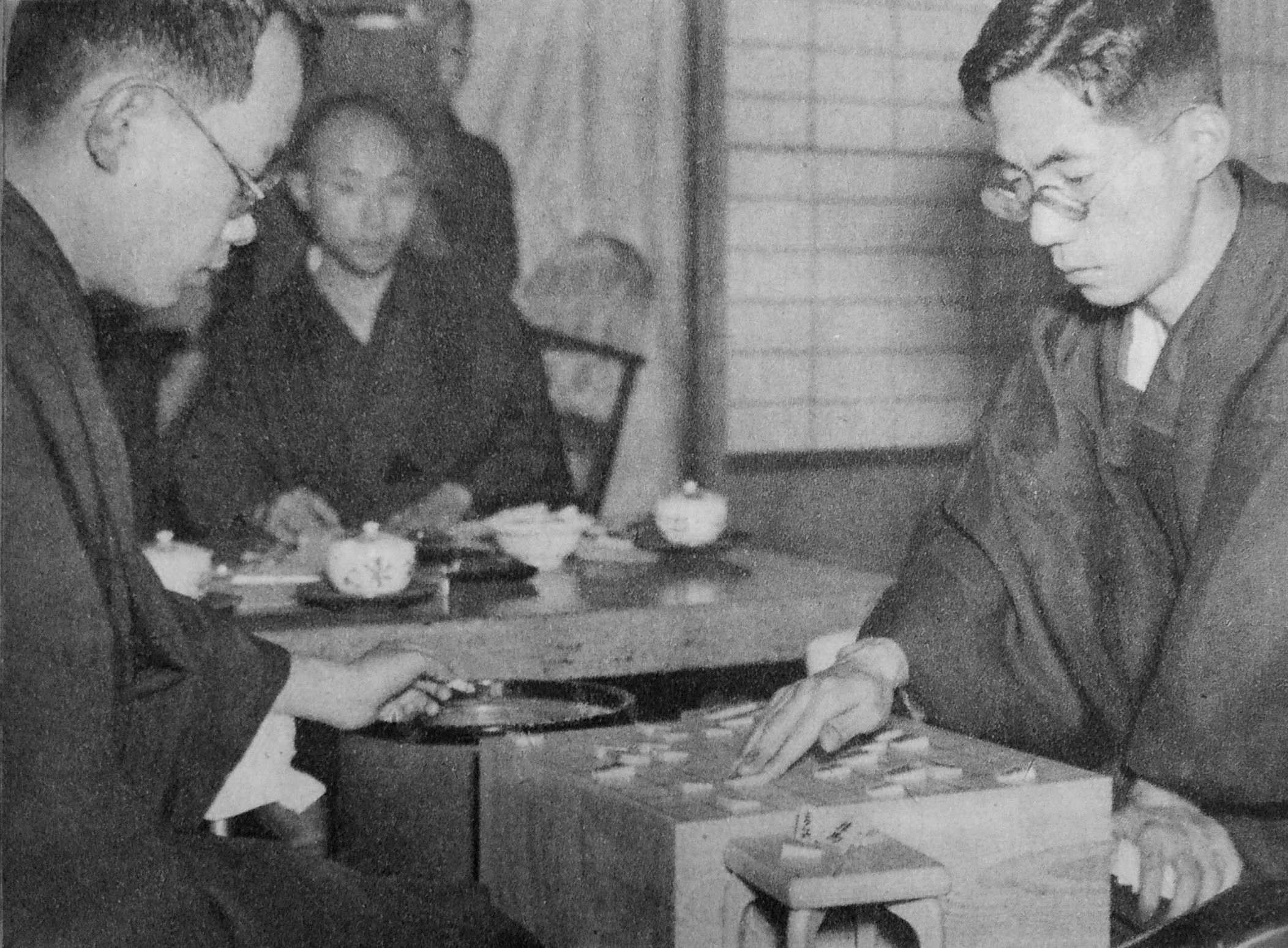
Masao Tsukada (right) playing against Yasuharu Ōyama in 1948 for the Meijin title.

Meijin (名人) is one of the eight titles in Japanese professional shogi, and is the most prestigious title, along with Ryūō. The word meijin (名 mei "excellent, artful", 人 jin "person") refers to a highly skilled master of a certain field (the various arts found in traditional Japanese culture, such as the Japanese tea ceremony, go, competitive karuta, rakugo, budō, etc.).

== History ==
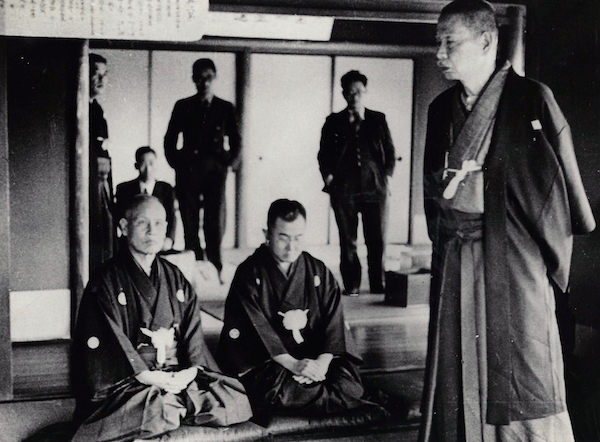
Sekine's Meijin Resignation Ceremony (将棋名人退就位式) in February 1938. Pictured sitting in the foreground are Sekine (left) and Kimura (right). (The person standing in the foreground is Kenosuke Kosuge.)

The Meijin institution started in the 17th century (Edo period), and for around 300 years (1612–1937) was a hereditary title that was passed from the reigning Meijin upon his retirement or death to another selected from three families (the Ohashi Main family, the Ohashi Branch family, and the Ito family), as deemed to be worthy. This is known as the Lifetime Meijin system (終生名人制). In 1935, however, the Japan Shogi Association, or JSA, announced that it was abolishing the existing system of succession in favor of something more short-term and reflective of actual playing strength, known as the Real Strength Meijin system (実力名人制). In 1937, the reigning 13th Meijin Kinjirō Sekine, who had received his title under the old system and was 70 years old at the time, voluntarily gave up his title so that a new Meijin could be decided through actual tournament play. Later that year Yoshio Kimura, who was a student of Sekine, became the first Meijin to gain the title based upon actual performance by winning a tournament which included eight other top players. From 1937 to 1947, the challenger for the Meijin title was determined through tournaments involving a select number of players. Finally, in 1947, the JSA officially established the preliminary round of ranking tournaments (順位戦, jun'isen) that it currently uses.

== Qualifying ==
The Meijin title is only open to professional shogi players that are members of the Meijin tournament system. This means that unlike some other tournaments amateur players, women's professional players, and regular professionals outside of the Meijin tournament system are not allowed to compete in the tournament.

The Meijin ranking tournaments are divided into five classes (A, B1, B2, C1, C2) and players compete against others within their class in a round-robin tournament throughout the year. Players who perform well during their class tournament may be promoted to the next highest class while those who perform poorly may be relegated to the next lowest one, except in the case of Class C2 where players are relegated to "Free class" status. New professionals are placed at the bottom of Class C2, and the top three players of Class C2 are promoted to Class C1 for the next year. Similarly, the top two players of Classes C1, B2, B1 are promoted to the B2, B1, and A, respectively, for the next year. A new professional, therefore, needs at least five years experience (five successive promotions) after their debut before they can qualify to challenge for the title of Meijin.

== Lifetime Meijin ==
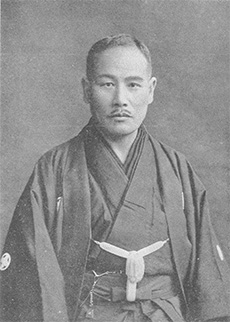
Kinjirō Sekine 關根金次郞 (1868–1946), the thirteenth Lifetime Meijin and last hereditary Meijin

The first thirteen Lifetime Meijins (終生名人, shūsei meijin) were determined through succession. The Lifetime Meijin as a competitive title, eisei meijin (永世名人), was established by the JSA in 1952. Players who capture the Meijin title five times (does not have to be consecutive) qualify to receive this title, but are only officially awarded it upon their retirement or death (with exceptions).

- 1st: Sōkei Ōhashi I
- 2nd: Sōko Ōhashi II
- 3rd: Sōkan Itō I
- 4th: Sōkei Ōhashi V
- 5th: Sōin Itō II
- 6th: Sōyo Ōhashi III
- 7th: Sōkan Itō III
- 8th: Sōkei Ōhashi IX
- 9th: Soei Ōhashi VI
- 10th: Sōkan Itō VI
- 11th: Sōin Itō VIII
- 12th: Gohei Ono
- 13th: Kinjirō Sekine (last name spelled: 關根 or 関根)
- 14th Lifetime Meijin: Yoshio Kimura (Qualified for title in 1946 at age 41. Awarded in 1952 upon retirement)
- 15th Lifetime Meijin: Yasuharu Ōyama (Qualified for title at age 33 in 1956. Awarded in 1976 (Note: Although typically awarded upon retirement or death, a special exception was made for Ōyama and he was officially awarded the title while still active in special recognition of his excellent results in professional play, including being the Meijin for 13 years in a row from 1959 to 1971.))
- 16th Lifetime Meijin: Makoto Nakahara (Qualified for title at age 29 in 1976. Awarded in 2007, prior to his retirement in 2009 )
- 17th Lifetime Meijin: Kōji Tanigawa (Qualified for title at age 35 in 1997. Still active)
- 18th Lifetime Meijin: Toshiyuki Moriuchi (Qualified for title in 2007 at age 36. Still active)
- 19th Lifetime Meijin: Yoshiharu Habu (Qualified for title in 2008 at age 37. Still active)

== Honorary Meijin ==
The Honorary Meijin (名誉名人, meiyo meijin) is another Mejin-related title. Only two have received this title, Kensosuke Kosuke in 1936 and Ichitarō Doi in 1954.

== Posthumous Meijin ==
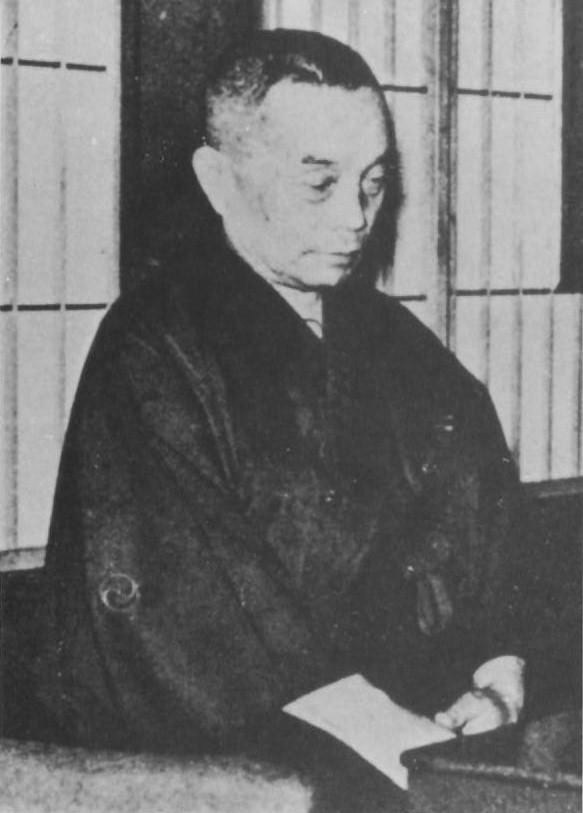
Sankichi Sakata

A special Posthumous Meijin (追贈名人, Tsuizō Meijin) title was given to Sankichi Sakata in 1955 by the Japan Shogi Association after his death in 1945. Sakata, a folk hero for the Osaka area, was known during his heyday for his brilliant, inventive playing but was prevented from becoming a normal Meijin by circumstances. Sakata is the only person to receive this title.

== Winners ==
Below is a list of past Meijin title holders from 1937 when the new tournament method for determining the title holder was established. The number in parentheses represents the cumulative times the player had won the title to date.

No.	Year	Winner	Score	Opponent	Note
1	1937–1938	Yoshio Kimura		league	The first Meijin was decided by tournament of nine players. Kimura placed first in the league. Chōtarō Hanada was second place. The others in the league were Ichitarō Doi, Kumao Ōsaki, Yasujirō Kon, Kinjirō Kimi, Kingorō Kaneko, Tatsunosuke Kanda, Kiyoshi Hagiwara.
2	1940	Yoshio Kimura (2)	4-1	Ichitarō Doi	
3	1942	Yoshio Kimura (3)	4-0	Tatsunosuke Kanda	
4	1943	Yoshio Kimura (4)			No match held. Kimura retained title by default. (Note: 12-player preliminary tournament held and top four finishers awarded "reserve qualifier" status. Each reserve qualifier then played a 3-game half-handicap non-title match against Kimura: Kimura alternated between giving a lance handicap and no handicap. Reserve qualifiers had to win their respective 3-game match to gain the right to challenge Kimura in a 7-game match for the title. (A playoff was to be held if multiple reserve qualifiers won their respective matches.) Since Kimura won all of the half-handicap matches, no reserve qualifier was able qualify as his challenger.)
5	1944	Yoshio Kimura (5)			No match held. Kimura retained title by default. (Note: A tournament to determine a challenger for Kimura did start, but was cancelled while in progress due to the Second World War.)
6	1947	Masao Tsukada	4-2	Yoshio Kimura	
7	1948	Masao Tsukada (2)	4-2	Yasuharu Ōyama	
8	1949	Yoshio Kimura (6)	3-2	Masao Tsukada	
9	1950	Yoshio Kimura (7)	4-2	Yasuharu Ōyama	
10	1951	Yoshio Kimura (8)	4-2	Kōzō Masuda	
11	1952	Yasuharu Ōyama	4-1	Yoshio Kimura	
12	1953	Yasuharu Ōyama (2)	4-1	Kōzō Masuda	
13	1954	Yasuharu Ōyama (3)	4-1	Kōzō Masuda	
14	1955	Yasuharu Ōyama (4)	4-2	Kazukiyo Takashima	
15	1956	Yasuharu Ōyama (5)	4-0	Motoji Hanamura	
16	1957	Kōzō Masuda	4-2	Yasuharu Ōyama	
17	1958	Kōzō Masuda (2)	4-2	Yasuharu Ōyama	
18	1959	Yasuharu Ōyama (6)	4-1	Kōzō Masuda	
19	1960	Yasuharu Ōyama (7)	4-1	Hifumi Katoh	
20	1961	Yasuharu Ōyama (8)	4-1	Yuzoh Maruta	
21	1962	Yasuharu Ōyama (9)	4-0	Tatsuya Futakami	
22	1963	Yasuharu Ōyama (10)	4-1	Kōzō Masuda	
23	1964	Yasuharu Ōyama (11)	4-2	Tatsuya Futakami	
24	1965	Yasuharu Ōyama (12)	4-1	Michiyoshi Yamada	
25	1966	Yasuharu Ōyama (13)	4-2	Kōzō Masuda	
26	1967	Yasuharu Ōyama (14)	4-1	Tatsuya Futakami	
27	1968	Yasuharu Ōyama (15)	4-0	Kōzō Masuda	
28	1969	Yasuharu Ōyama (16)	4-3	Michio Ariyoshi	
29	1970	Yasuharu Ōyama (17)	4-1	Rensho Nada	
30	1971	Yasuharu Ōyama (18)	4-3	Kōzō Masuda	
31	1972	Makoto Nakahara	4-3	Yasuharu Ōyama	
32	1973	Makoto Nakahara (2)	4-0	Hifumi Katoh	
33	1974	Makoto Nakahara (3)	4-3	Yasuharu Ōyama	
34	1975	Makoto Nakahara (4)	4-3	Nobuyuki Ōuchi	
35	1976	Makoto Nakahara (5)	4-3	Kunio Yonenaga	
35	1977	Makoto Nakahara			No match held. Nakahara retained title by default. (Note: The JSA unable to come to terms with Asahi Shimbun, the match's sponsor, over the prize fund. The JSA requested that the total prize fund be increased from 11,000,000 yen to 30,000,000 yen, but Asahi Shimbun refused. Negotiations were held in attempt to find a compromise, but were unsuccessful and the Asahi Shimbun's sponsorship of the match was ended.)
36	1978	Makoto Nakahara (6)	4-2	Keiji Mori	
37	1979	Makoto Nakahara (7)	4-2	Kunio Yonenaga	
38	1980	Makoto Nakahara (8)	4-1	Kunio Yonenaga	
39	1981	Makoto Nakahara (9)	4-1	Kiyozumi Kiriyama	
40	1982	Hifumi Katoh	4-3	Makoto Nakahara	
41	1983	Koji Tanigawa (1)	4-2	Hifumi Katoh	
42	1984	Koji Tanigawa (2)	4-1	Hidemitsu Moriyasu	
43	1985	Makoto Nakahara (10)	4-2	Koji Tanigawa	
44	1986	Makoto Nakahara (11)	4-1	Yasuharu Ōyama	
45	1987	Makoto Nakahara (12)	4-2	Kunio Yonenaga	
46	1988	Koji Tanigawa (3)	4-2	Makoto Nakahara	
47	1989	Koji Tanigawa (4)	4-0	Kunio Yonenaga	
48	1990	Makoto Nakahara (13)	4-2	Koji Tanigawa	
49	1991	Makoto Nakahara (14)	4-1	Kunio Yonenaga	
50	1992	Makoto Nakahara (15)	4-3	Michio Takahashi	
51	1993	Kunio Yonenaga	4-0	Makoto Nakahara	
52	1994	Yoshiharu Habu	4-2	Kunio Yonenaga	
53	1995	Yoshiharu Habu (2)	4-1	Taku Morishita	
54	1996	Yoshiharu Habu (3)	4-1	Toshiyuki Moriuchi	
55	1997	Koji Tanigawa (5)	4-2	Yoshiharu Habu	
56	1998	Yasumitsu Satō	4-3	Koji Tanigawa	
57	1999	Yasumitsu Satō (2)	4-3	Koji Tanigawa	
58	2000	Tadahisa Maruyama	4-3	Yasumitsu Satō	
59	2001	Tadahisa Maruyama (2)	4-3	Koji Tanigawa	
60	2002	Toshiyuki Moriuchi	4-0	Tadahisa Maruyama	
61	2003	Yoshiharu Habu (4)	4-0	Toshiyuki Moriuchi	
62	2004	Toshiyuki Moriuchi (2)	4-2	Yoshiharu Habu	
63	2005	Toshiyuki Moriuchi (3)	4-3	Yoshiharu Habu	
64	2006	Toshiyuki Moriuchi (4)	4-2	Koji Tanigawa	
65	2007	Toshiyuki Moriuchi (5)	4-3	Masataka Gōda	
66	2008	Yoshiharu Habu (5)	4-2	Toshiyuki Moriuchi	
67	2009	Yoshiharu Habu (6)	4-3	Masataka Gōda	
68	2010	Yoshiharu Habu (7)	4-0	Hiroyuki Miura	
69	2011	Toshiyuki Moriuchi (6)	4-3	Yoshiharu Habu	
70	2012	Toshiyuki Moriuchi (7)	4-2	Yoshiharu Habu	
71	2013	Toshiyuki Moriuchi (8)	4-1	Yoshiharu Habu	
72	2014	Yoshiharu Habu (8)	4-0	Toshiyuki Moriuchi	
73	2015	Yoshiharu Habu (9)	4-1	Hisashi Namekata	
74	2016	Amahiko Satō	4-1	Yoshiharu Habu	
75	2017	Amahiko Satō (2)	4-2	Akira Inaba	
76	2018	Amahiko Satō (3)	4-2	Yoshiharu Habu	
77	2019	Masayuki Toyoshima	4-0	Amahiko Satō	
78	2020	Akira Watanabe	4-2	Masayuki Toyoshima	
79	2021	Akira Watanabe (2)	4-1	Shintarō Saitō	
80	2022	Akira Watanabe (3)	4-1	Shintarō Saitō	
81	2023	Sōta Fujii	4-1	Akira Watanabe	
82	2024	Sōta Fujii (2)	4-1	Masayuki Toyoshima	
83	2025	Sōta Fujii (3)	4-1	Takuya Nagase	
84	2026	Sōta Fujii (4)	4-0	Tetsurō Itodani	

== Records ==
- Most titles overall: Yasuharu Ōyama, 18 (Note: Nakahara is next with 15, followed by Habu with 9, Kimura and Moriuchi with 8 apiece, and Tanigawa with 5. Only Tanigawa, Habu and Moriuchi are still active.)
- Most consecutive titles: Yasuharu Ōyama, 13 in a row (1959-1971). (Note: Nakahara is next with nine in a row (1972-1981))
- Oldest player to win title: Kunio Yonenaga, 49 years 11 months (1993)
- Youngest player to win title: Sōta Fujii, 20 years old (2023)
- Oldest player to challenge for title: Yasuharu Ōyama, 63 years old (1986)
- Youngest player to challenge for title: Hifumi Katō (1960) and Sōta Fujii (2023) at 20 years old
- Most times recapturing title: Yoshiharu Habu, 3 (Note: Habu lost the title for first time in 1997, but won it back in 2003. He lost the title again in 2004, only to recapture it for the second time in 2008. He lost title for the third time in 2011, but recaptured it again three years later in 2014.)
- Longest period between titles: Yoshiharu Habu, 6 years (1997-2002)

== Players by Meijin class ==
Below is a list of professional players grouped by their class for the 85th Meijin league (April 2026 – March 2027) including their dan ranking as of 16 June 2026. The 84th Meijin title holder is Sōta Fujii.

Other professional players not listed here do not participate in the Meijin league and are known as Free Class (フリークラス furī kurasu) players. There are 36 such players as of 1 April 2025.

84th Meijin
Name	Dan	Other titles held at start of league play
Sōta Fujii	9	Kiō, Kisei, Ōshō, Ōza, Ryūō

=== Class A ===
85th Meijin League Class A
Seed	Name	Dan	Titles held at start of league play
1	Tetsurō Itodani (Note: The loser of the previous season's Meijin title match is seeded first in the following season's Class A League play)	9	
2	Takuya Nagase	9	
3	Masayuki Toyoshima	9	
4	Seiya Kondō	8	
5	Yasuhiro Masuda	8	
6	Yūki Sasaki	8	
7	Shōta Chida	8	
8	Amahiko Satō	9	
9	Akihito Hirose	9	
10	Takumi Itō	9	Eiō and Ōi

=== Class B1 ===
85th Meijin League Class B1
Seed	Name	Dan
1	Taichi Nakamura	8
2	Akira Watanabe	9
3	Takahiro Ōhashi	7
4	Shintarō Saitō	8
5	Shin'ichirō Hattori	7
6	Shingo Sawada	7
7	Tadashi Ōishi	7
8	Tatsuya Sugai	8
9	Akira Inaba	8
10	Yasumitsu Satō	9
11	Takayuki Yamasaki	9
12	Toshiaki Kubo	9
13	Nagisa Fujimoto	9

=== Class B2 ===
85th Meijin League Class B2
Seed	Name	Dan	Titles held at start of league play
1	Mirai Aoshima	7	
2	Kentarō Ishii	7	
3	Taichi Takami	7	
4	Yoshiharu Habu	9	
5	Yasuaki Murayama	8	
6	Tadahisa Maruyama	9	
7	Yūsei Koga	6	
8	Hiroaki Yokoyama	7	
9	Kōji Tanigawa	9	17th Lifetime Meijin
10	Asuto Saitō	6	
11	Kazushi Watanabe	7	
12	Chikara Akutsu	7	
13	Makoto Tobe	7	
14	Kōichi Fukaura	9	
15	Ayumu Matsuo	8	
16	Hiroyuki Miura	9	
17	Takuma Oikawa	7	
18	Masataka Gōda	9	
19	Makoto Sasaki	7	
20	Hisashi Namekata	9	
21	Ryūma Tonari	7	
22	Takuya Nishida	6	
23	Reo Okabe	6	
24	Nobuyuki Yashiki	9	
25	Kazutoshi Satō	7	
26	Kazuki Kimura	9	
27	Kensuke Kitahama	8	

=== Class C1 ===
85th Meijin League Class C1
Seed	Name	Dan
1	Takeshi Fujii	9
2	Daisuke Suzuki	9
3	Masataka Sugimoto	8
4	Seiya Tomita	5
5	Tatsuya Sanmaidō	7
6	Akihiro Takada	5
7	Hiroki Iizuka	8
8	Takashi Ikenaga	6
9	Takayuki Kuroda	6
10	Wakamu Deguchi	6
11	Hirotoshi Ueno	6
12	Eiji Iijima	8
13	Daisuke Katagami	7
14	Keita Kadokura	6
15	Hirotaka Nozuki	8
16	Manabu Senzaki	9
17	Yūta Komori	5
18	Hiroshi Miyamoto	6
19	Issei Takazaki	7
20	Atsushi Miyata	7
21	Takashi Abe	9
22	Akihiro Murata	6
23	Kōhei Funae	7
24	Mamoru Hatakeyama	8
25	Satoshi Takano	6
26	Reo Kurosawa	6
27	Daichi Sasaki	7
28	Kenjirō Abe	7
29	Akira Nishio	7
30	Keita Inoue	9
31	Daisuke Nakagawa	8

=== Class C2 ===
85th Meijin League Class C2
Seed	Name	Dan
1	Naruyuki Hatakeyama	8
2	Osamu Nakamura	9
3	Kenta Miyajima	4
4	Wataru Yashiro	8
5	Yoshitaka Hoshino	5
6	Yūsuke Tōyama	6
7	Mikio Kariyama	5
8	Akihiro Ida	5
9	Kazuo Sugimoto	6
10	Hirotaka Kajiura	7
11	Hiroki Taniai	5
12	Kōhei Hasebe	6
13	Kenshi Tokuda	5
14	Shōgo Orita	5
15	Taiki Yamakawa	4
16	Junpei Ide	4
17	Reo Koyama	4
18	Ryūma Yoshiike	4
19	Yūki Saitō	4
20	Keiichi Sanada	8
21	Hiroshi Yamamoto	5
22	Naohiro Ishida	6
23	Shin'ya Satō	7
24	Yūta Ishikawa	5
25	Naoki Koyama	4
26	Yūichi Tanaka	6
27	Yūjirō Takahashi	4
28	Toshiki Sumisaki	4
29	Shūji Muranaka	7
30	Kei Honda	6
31	Tomoki Yokoyama	4
32	Ehoto Osogaguchi	4
33	Sakio Chiba	7
34	Kōsuke Tamura	7
35	Hiromu Watanabe	6
36	Yūya Saitō	4
37	Kōta Kanai	6
38	Kenji Imaizumi	5
39	Kōru Abe	7
40	Shōji Segawa	6
41	Shingo Itō	6
42	Kazuhiro Nishikawa	6
43	Wataru Kamimura	5
44	Ryōsuke Nakamura	6
45	Tetsuya Fujimori	6
46	Satoru Sakaguchi	6
47	Yoshiyuki Kubota	7
48	Shūji Satō	8
49	Shin'ichi Satō	6
50	Michio Takahashi	9
51	Saito Morimoto	4
52	Taku Morishita	9
53	Mitsunori Makino	6
54	Tadao Kitajima	7
55	Kanta Masegi	5
56	Rintarō Iwamura	4
57	Hiroto Ikegaki	4
58	Ao Kokubo	4
59	Yūto Kawamura	4

== See also ==
- Meijin (Go)
