= NHK Cup (shogi) =

Japanese professional shogi tournament

The NHK Cup, officially the NHK Cup TV Shogi Tournament (NHK杯テレビ将棋トーナメント, enu eichi kei hai terebi shōgi tōnamento), is a professional shogi tournament organized by the Japan Shogi Association and sponsored by Japan's public broadcaster NHK. The winner of the tournament is referred to as the "NHK Cup Champion" (NHK杯選手権者, NHK Senshukensha), with the most recent winner (as of March 2026) being Sōta Fujii.

== History ==
Formerly known as the NHK Cup Competition Shogi Tournament (NHK杯争奪将棋トーナメント, enu eichi kei hai sōdatsu tōnamento), the 1st NHK Cup was held in 1951 with eight professional shogi players. The winner was Yoshio Kimura, who held the Meijin title at the time. Prior to 1962, the tournament was broadcast only on the radio, but starting with the 12th NHK Cup (1962), the tournament moved to television. The 26th NHK Cup (1976) was the first to be broadcast in color.

Up until and including the 15th NHK Cup (1965), only Class A professionals were allowed to participate. When the number of players was increased from 8 to 16 for the 16th NHK Cup (1966), the tournament became open to other professionals as well. The number of players was increased again from 16 to 26 for the 27th NHK Cup (1977) and to its current level of 50 for the 31st NHK Cup (1981). In addition, the preliminary tournaments also started with the 31st NHK Cup.

Women's professionals were allowed to participate for the first time in the 43rd NHK Cup (1993). Hiroe Nakai was the first woman to participate in the tournament. To commemorate of tournament's 60th anniversary, the number of players was increased to 51 players for the 60th NHK Cup (2010) to allow a second female professional to participate. The number of players returned to 50 for the 61st NHK Cup (2011).

Although tournament games are typically recorded in advance in a closed studio for broadcast at a later date, the final of the 45th NHK Cup (1995) was the first to be held before a studio audience. This was repeated again for the final of the 49th NHK Cup (1999). The final for the 57th NHK Cup (2007) was the first to be broadcast live.

To commemorate the tournament's 50th anniversary, the final of the 50th NHK Cup (2000) was held at the Kansai Shogi Kaikan. This was the first time that a final was held outside of Tokyo.

The tournament returned to radio in 2010, when the final of 60th NHK Cup was also broadcast on the NHK Radio 1. The finals for both the 61st and 62nd NHK Cups were also broadcast on NHK Radio 1. In addition, each tournament game can also be viewed online for a short period of time after it has been broadcast and for a small fee using the NHK On Demand service. This video-on-demand (VOD) service, however, was only available to those living in Japan. In April 2014, NHK discontinued this service for the 64th NHK Cup.

Broadcasts of the 70th NHK Cup tournament (April 2020 – March 2020) were temporarily suspended from mid May to mid June 2020 in response to the Japanese Government's declaration of a state of emergency regarding the COVID-19 pandemic. Games which had already been recorded were broadcast as scheduled, but no new games could be recorded due a suspension of all official games put into effect by the Japan Shogi Association at the beginning of April. Encore presentations of Yoshiharu Habu's victories over four Meijins were broadcast instead in the same time slot. When the game broadcasts resumed, a number of changes had been made to the studio set in consideration of the social distancing policies advocated by the government to reduce the spread of the virus. Games were played with players seated at a table using a table-top shogi board. In addition, protective transparent screens were placed in front of the player's faces and the each player wore a mask. The host of the tournament stood off to the side of the set and read-off the game moves from that position, while the time keeper (also wearing a mask) sat to at the side of the table protected by another screen.

== Format ==
The tournament is actually made up of two parts: the main tournament, and preliminary tournaments. The main tournament is a 6-round single elimination tournament in which 50 players (divided into two 25-player blocks: "Block A" and "Block B") compete for the title of "NHK Cup Champion". The first 4 rounds determine the four players who will meet in the two semifinals to determine the winner of each block; The two block winners then meet in the final to determine the overall tournament winner. All of the games played in the main tournament are televised.

=== Participants ===
A total of 50 players compete in the main tournament: 49 male professionals and 1 female professional. Of the 50 players, 32 are seeded and 18 are preliminary tournament winners. Seeded players are determined based upon their results as of December 31 of the previous year. The criteria for selecting seeded players are as follows:

1. The winner, runner-up and two losing semifinalists from the previous year's tournament. (These players are guaranteed not to be paired with each other until the semifinal round (round 5))
2. Current titleholders of the eight major titles main titles: Meijin, Ryūō, Kiō, ōshō, ōza, ōi, Kisei and Eiou
3. Lifetime title holders or those who have qualified for such titles (including "Lifetime NHK Cup champions") and players in either Class A or Class B1.
4. Winners of other tournaments during the previous year.
5. One female professional
6. Players who had performed at an exceptionally high level during the previous year. Typically, these are players who ranked at the top in terms of the number of games played, number of games won, and winning percentage on the JSA's year end ranking of players. (The actual number varies depending upon the number of players selected according to Nos. 1 through 4 above)

Among the seeded players, fourteen are directly seeded into round 2 and, thus, only need to win five games to win the tournament. These include the defending NHK Cup Champion, the previous year's runner-up, the previous year's other two semifinalists, and all of the players in Class A as of December 31 of the previous year. Occasionally other players are also seeded into round 2 in order to complete the fourteen if necessary; This often happens when one or more of the Class A players is also one of the previous year's tournament's semifinalists or a reigning major title holder.

Professionals who do not qualify as one of the aforementioned seeds must win a preliminary tournament in order to advance to the main tournament. The tournaments are held at the Tokyo Shogi Kaikan and Kansai Shogi Kaikan. The preliminary tournaments are one-day tournaments open and, depending upon the number of players playing (typically seven to eight players per tournament), the winner must win either two or three consecutive games to win the tournament.

=== Brackets ===
The preliminaries and the main tournament use a bracket system. The main tournament consists of six round. In Round 1, there are nine games played in each bracket and the winners of those games advance. In Round 2, there are eight games played in each bracket and the winners advance. In Round 3, the remaining eight players in each bracket compete for the right to advance to the quarterfinals. The quarterfinalists then play each other for a spot in the semifinals; and finally, the last four players face each other for a spot in the final. A total of 47 games are played in a tournament; However, this may end up being more if there are any games replayed because they ended in sennichite or impasse.

50-player Main Tournament Bracket

Preliminary Tournament Bracket (8 Players)

Preliminary Tournament Bracket (7 players)

=== Time controls ===
The NHK Cup is a "quick play" (早指し, hayazashi) tournament with time controls that are quite short in comparison to those of the major shogi titles. The entire game usually lasts no more than ninety minutes whereas a major title game often spans two days, and a single move can take hours. An analog chess clock is used to keep track of each player's first time control. Unlike professional chess tournaments, professional shogi players do not have to manage their own clocks or keep the game score. An official "game score keeper" (記録係, kiroku gakari), typically a shōreikai member, keeps the official record of the game and keeps track of each player's time. (Note: The official game score keeper also performs the "piece toss" (振り駒, furigoma) prior to the game to determine the "player who moves first" (先手, sente).) In addition to the official game score keeper, there is also an "official game score reader" (棋譜読み上げ, kifū yomiage) who announces each move after it is played as well as the total number of moves played and the final result once the game has finished. The official game score reader for main tournament games is typically a women's professional.

==== Preliminary tournaments ====
The first time control (持ち時間, mochi jikan) is 20 minutes per player followed by a byōyomi time control of 30 seconds per move. A player in byōyomi who fails to make their move within 30 seconds loses the game. The remaining seconds of byōyomi are counted down by the official game score keeper.

==== Main tournament (televised games) ====
The first time control is 10 minutes per player. Once this 10 minutes has been used up, a second time control of 10 one-minute periods of "thinking time" (考慮時間, kōryō jikan) starts. (Note: Each player is given 30 seconds to make a move. If a player makes a move within 30 seconds, no thinking time periods are used. If, however, the player takes more than 30 seconds to make a move, a thinking time period begins and the player will then have 1 minute (more specifically 59 seconds) to make a move before entering the next thinking time period. This process is repeated until the player has used all 10 thinking time periods.) When a player has used up all of their thinking time periods, a final byōyomi time control of 30 seconds per move begins. The official game score keeper counts down the remaining seconds of a thinking time period, announces when a player has used up one of these periods as well as the number of periods remaining, and counts down the remaining seconds of the byōyomi time control.

== Tournament records ==
- Most tournament championships: Yoshiharu Habu, 11
- Youngest player to win a championship: Yoshiharu Habu, 18 years old, 38th NHK Cup (1988)
- Oldest player to win a championship: Yasuharu Ōyama, 61 years old, 30th NHK Cup (1980)
- Lowest ranked player to win championship: Yōichi Kushida, 4 dan, 39th NHK Cup (1989)
- Most consecutive championships: Yoshiharu Habu, 4, the 58th to 61st NHK Cups (2008 to 2011)
- Oldest player to win a tournament game: Yūzō Maruta won his round 1 game of the 42nd NHK Cup (1992) at the age of 73.
- Oldest player to qualify for the tournament: Michio Ariyoshi qualified for the 60th NHK Cup (2010) at the age of 75. He lost his first-round game.
- Longest period between championships: 12 years, Hifumi Katō won the 43rd NHK Cup (1993) 12 years after winning the 31st NHK Cup (1981)
- Fewest moves: 39, Tetsurō Itodani 5 dan (Black) vs. Tadahisa Maruyama 9 dan (White), semifinals 60th NHK Cup (2010), March 20, 2011

=== Lifetime NHK Cup Champions ===
Players who win the tournament a total of 10 times qualify for the title "Lifetime NHK Cup Champion" and as such are granted a lifetime seed into all future NHK Cups. To date, only Yoshiharu Habu has qualified to be a Lifetime NHK Cup Champion (Note: Although lifetime titles in professional shogi are, in principle, only officially awarded to those who qualify upon their retirement or death, it is not usual for those still active to be referred to by their titles as a sign of respect. Unlike other lifetime titles, however, the Lifetime NHK Cup Champion title is officially awarded after qualification regardless of whether the player is still active.) Habu has won the tournament a total of 11 times. The next closest is Yasuharu Ōyama (deceased) who won the tournament 8 times, and the next closest currently active player is Hifumi Katō who has won the tournament 7 times. Habu qualified for the title by beating Akira Watanabe to win the 61st NHK Cup (2011) on March 18, 2012.

=== Past winners ===
The following is a list of the winners and runners-up for past NHK Cup TV Shogi Tournaments. (Note: Western order (first name, family name) is used for names. For the traditional Japanese naming order please see Japanese names in English and Western languages) "No." refers to number of times the tournament had been held up until that time, and "year" refers to the year in which the tournament began. (Note: The JSA does not, in general, use calendar years to identify its tournaments. It uses ordinal numbers and the counter words kai (回) or ki (期) instead to refer to a tournament by the number of "times" or "periods" it has been held to date. For example, the tournament that began in April 2013 and ended in March 2014, is officially referred to as the 63rd NHK Cup TV Shogi Tournament" because it was the 63rd time the tournament had been held. Winners of tournaments are referred to in a similar fashion, e.g., the winner of the 2013-2014 tournament is called the "63rd NHK Cup Champion".) The number in parentheses next to the winner's name is the number of times that they had won the tournament up until that point. (Note: For example, a "(2)" next to a winner's name means that this was the second time they won the tournament.)

| No. | Year | Winner | Runner-up |
|---|---|---|---|
| 1 | 1951 | Yoshio Kimura | Kōzō Masuda |
| 2 | 1952 | Kōzō Masuda | Yūzō Maruta |
| 3 | 1953 | Masao Tsukada | Motoji Hanamura |
| 4 | 1954 | Yasuharu Ōyama | Masao Tsukada |
| 5 | 1955 | Yasuharu Ōyama (2) | Renshō Nada |
| 6 | 1956 | Yasuo Harada | Renshō Nada |
| 7 | 1957 | Kōzō Masuda (2) | Renshō Nada |
| 8 | 1958 | Renshō Nada | Yasuharu Ōyama |
| 9 | 1959 | Yūzō Maruta | Genichi Ōno |
| 10 | 1960 | Hifumi Katō | Yasuharu Ōyama |
| 11 | 1961 | Yasuharu Ōyama (3) | Hiroji Katō |
| 12 | 1962 | Renshō Nada (2) | Kōzō Masuda |
| 13 | 1963 | Kōzō Masuda (3) | Hifumi Katō |
| 14 | 1964 | Yasuharu Ōyama (4) | Masao Tsukada |
| 15 | 1965 | Yūzō Maruta (2) | Kōzō Masuda |
| 16 | 1966 | Hifumi Katō (2) | Tatsuya Futagami |
| 17 | 1967 | Noboru Ōtomo | Tatsuya Futagami |
| 18 | 1968 | Yūzō Maruta (3) | Michiyoshi Yamada |
| 19 | 1969 | Kunio Naitō | Shigeru Sekine |
| 20 | 1970 | Yasuharu Ōyama (5) | Makoto Nakahara |
| 21 | 1971 | Hifumi Katō (3) | Nobuyuki Ōuchi |
| 22 | 1972 | Yasuharu Ōyama (6) | Kunio Yonenaga |
| 23 | 1973 | Hifumi Katō (4) | Kunio Naitō |
| 24 | 1974 | Makoto Nakahara | Kunio Naitō |
| 25 | 1975 | Nobuyuki Ōuchi | Tatsuya Futagami |
| 26 | 1976 | Hifumi Katō (5) | Kunio Yonenaga |
| 27 | 1977 | Makoto Nakahara (2) | Hifumi Katō |
| 28 | 1978 | Kunio Yonenaga | Kazuo Manabe |
| 29 | 1979 | Yasuharu Ōyama (7) | Keiji Mori |
| 30 | 1980 | Michio Ariyoshi | Makoto Nakahara |
| 31 | 1981 | Hifumi Katō (6) | Hatasu Itō |
| 32 | 1982 | Makoto Nakahara (3) | Teruichi Aono |
| 33 | 1983 | Yasuharu Ōyama (8) | Hifumi Katō |
| 34 | 1984 | Torahiko Tanaka | Hifumi Katō |
| 35 | 1985 | Kōji Tanigawa | Kunio Naitō |
| 36 | 1986 | Yūji Maeda | Keiji Mori |
| 37 | 1987 | Makoto Nakahara (4) | Osamu Nakamura |
| 38 | 1988 | Yoshiharu Habu | Makoto Nakahara |
| 39 | 1989 | Yōichi Kushida | Akira Shima |
| 40 | 1990 | Manabu Senzaki | Yoshikazu Minami |
| 41 | 1991 | Yoshiharu Habu (2) | Yasuaki Tsukada |
| 42 | 1992 | Makoto Nakahara (5) | Akira Shima |
| 43 | 1993 | Hifumi Katō (7) | Yasumitsu Satō |
| 44 | 1994 | Makoto Nakahara (6) | Kunio Yonenaga |
| 45 | 1995 | Yoshiharu Habu (3) | Daisuke Nakagawa |
| 46 | 1996 | Toshiyuki Moriuchi | Nobuyuki Yashiki |
| 47 | 1997 | Yoshiharu Habu (4) | Satoshi Murayama |
| 48 | 1998 | Yoshiharu Habu (5) | Kazushiza Horiguchi |
| 49 | 1999 | Daisuke Suzuki | Masataka Gōda |
| 50 | 2000 | Yoshiharu Habu (6) | Toshiaki Kubo |
| 51 | 2001 | Toshiyuki Moriuchi (2) | Yasumitsu Satō |
| 52 | 2002 | Hiroyuki Miura | Manabu Senzaki |
| 53 | 2003 | Toshiaki Kubo | Yoshiharu Habu |
| 54 | 2004 | Takayuki Yamasaki | Yoshiharu Habu |
| 55 | 2005 | Tadahisa Maruyama | Akira Watanabe |
| 56 | 2006 | Yasumitsu Satō | Toshiyuki Moriuchi |
| 57 | 2007 | Yasumitsu Satō (2) | Daisuke Suzuki |
| 58 | 2008 | Yoshiharu Habu (7) | Toshiyuki Moriuchi |
| 59 | 2009 | Yoshiharu Habu (8) | Tetsurō Itodani |
| 60 | 2010 | Yoshiharu Habu (9) | Tetsurō Itodani |
| 61 | 2011 | Yoshiharu Habu (10) | Akira Watanabe |
| 62 | 2012 | Akira Watanabe | Yoshiharu Habu |
| 63 | 2013 | Masataka Gōda | Tadahisa Maruyama |
| 64 | 2014 | Toshiyuki Moriuchi (3) | Hisashi Namekata |
| 65 | 2015 | Yasuaki Murayama | Shōta Chida |
| 66 | 2016 | Yasumitsu Satō (3) | Kazutoshi Satō |
| 67 | 2017 | Takayuki Yamasaki (2) | Akira Inaba |
| 68 | 2018 | Yoshiharu Habu (11) | Masataka Gōda |
| 69 | 2019 | Kōichi Fukaura | Akira Inaba |
| 70 | 2020 | Akira Inaba | Shintarō Saitō |
| 71 | 2021 | Masayuki Toyoshima | Ayumu Matsuo |
| 72 | 2022 | Sōta Fujii | Yūki Sasaki |
| 73 | 2023 | Yūki Sasaki | Sōta Fujii |
| 74 | 2024 | Sōta Fujii (2) | Masataka Gōda |
| 75 | 2025 | Sōta Fujii (3) | Yasuhiro Masuda |

== Women's professionals ==
Women's professionals have been participating in the tournament since the 43rd NHK Cup (1993). The following table shows those who have participated in the tournament over the years as well as their opponents and results.

| No. | Year | Name | Round | Opponent | Result |
|---|---|---|---|---|---|
| 43 | 1993 | Hiroe Nakai | 1 | Manabu Senzaki 5d | L |
| 44 | 1994 | Ichiyo Shimizu | 1 | Shingo Hirafuji 4d | L |
| 45 | 1995 | Ichiyo Shimizu | 1 | Naruyuki Hatakeyama 5d | L |
| 46 | 1996 | Ichiyo Shimizu | 1 | Hiroki Iizuka 4d | L |
| 47 | 1997 | Ichiyo Shimizu | 1 | Kōichi Fukaura 5d | L |
| 48 | 1998 | Ichiyo Shimizu | 1 | Kensuke Kitahama 6d | L |
| 49 | 1999 | Ichiyo Shimizu | 1 | Akio Ishikawa 6d | L |
| 50 | 2000 | Hiroe Nakai | 1 | Hirotaka Nozuki 4d | L |
| 51 | 2001 | Ichiyo Shimizu | 1 | Naruyuki Hatakeyama 6d | L |
| 52 | 2002 | Ichiyo Shimizu | 1 | Jun'ichi Kase 6d | L |
| 53 | 2003 | Hiroe Nakai | 1 | Mamoru Hatakeyama 6d | W |
| 53 | 2003 | Hiroe Nakai | 2 | Teruichi Aono 9d | W |
| 53 | 2003 | Hiroe Nakai | 3 | Makoto Nakahara Lifetime 10d | L |
| 54 | 2004 | Hiroe Nakai | 1 | Shūji Satō 6d | W |
| 54 | 2004 | Hiroe Nakai | 2 | Yasumitsu Satō Kisei | L |
| 55 | 2005 | Ichiyo Shimizu | 1 | Takeshi Kawakami 5d | L |
| 56 | 2006 | Ryoko Chiba | 1 | Isao Nakata 7d | L |
| 57 | 2007 | Ryoko Chiba | 1 | Kazutoshi Satō 4d | L |
| 58 | 2008 | Ichiyo Shimizu | 1 | Tetsurō Itodani 4d | L |
| 59 | 2009 | Rieko Yauchi | 1 | Yōichi Kushida 6d | L |
| 60 | 2010 | Kana Satomi | 1 | Hiroshi Kobayashi 6d | L |
| 60 | 2010 | Ichiyo Shimizu | 1 | Kazushiza Horiguchi 7d | L |
| 61 | 2011 | Tomomi Kai | 1 | Akira Shima 9d | L |
| 62 | 2012 | Tomomi Kai | 1 | Hirotaka Nozuki 7d | L |
| 63 | 2013 | Hatsumi Ueda | 1 | Kazuhiro Nishikawa 4d | L |
| 64 | 2014 | Manao Kagawa | 1 | Manabu Kumasaka 5d | L |
| 65 | 2015 | Tomomi Kai | 1 | Tetsuya Fujimori 4d | L |
| 66 | 2016 | Momoko Katō | 1 | Kazutoshi Satō 6d | L |
| 67 | 2017 | Momoko Katō | 1 | Seiya Kondō 5d | L |
| 68 | 2018 | Momoko Katō | 1 | Takuma Oikawa 6d | W |
| 68 | 2018 | Momoko Katō | 2 | Toshiyuki Moriuchi 9d | L |
| 69 | 2019 | Kana Satomi | 1 | Issei Takazaki 6d | W |
| 69 | 2019 | Kana Satomi | 2 | Akira Inaba 8d | L |
| 70 | 2020 | Tomoka Nishiyama | 1 | Makoto Sasaki 7d | L |
| 71 | 2021 | Tomoka Nishiyama | 1 | Wataru Yashiro 7d | L |
| 72 | 2022 | Kana Satomi | 1 | Kenji Imaizumi 5d | L |
| 73 | 2023 | Kana Satomi | 1 | Kohei Funae 6d | W |
| 73 | 2023 | Kana Satomi | 2 | Toshiaki Kubo 9d | L |
| 74 | 2024 | Tomoka Nishiyama | 1 | Kazuki Kimura 9d | W |
| 74 | 2024 | Tomoka Nishiyama | 2 | Sōta Fujii 7-crown | L |

Note: "W" stands for "win" and "L" stands for "loss".

=== Preliminaries ===
From 2005 until 2015, the participating women's professional was determined by a playoff between the reigning women's title holders; however, the selection process was revised in 2016 for the 66th NHK Cup so that the women's professional was determined based upon the recommendation of the Japan Shogi Association, but reverted to a playoff format for the 67th NHK Cup. The name of each year's qualifier is indicated in bold.

| No. | Year | Name(s) | Note |
|---|---|---|---|
| 55 | 2005 | **Ichiyo Shimizu** and Hiroe Nakai | Shimizu (Women's Meijin, Women's ōi, Kurashiki Tōka), Nakai (Women's ōshō) |
| 56 | 2006 | **Ryoko Chiba** and Ichiyo Shimizu | Chiba (Women's ōshō), Shimizu (Women's Meijin, Women's ōi, Kurashiki Tōka) |
| 57 | 2007 | **Ryoko Chiba**, Ichiyo Shimizu, Rieko Yauchi and Haruko Saida | Chiba (Women's ōshō), Shimizu (Women's ōi), Yauchi (Women's Meijin) and Saida (Kurashiki Tōka). Chiba beat Saida and Shimizu beat Yauchi in Rd. 1. Chiba then beat Shimizu in Rd. 2. |
| 58 | 2008 | **Ichiyo Shimizu**, Rieko Yauchi and Sachio Ishibashi | Shimizu (Women's ōshō, Kurashiki Tōka), Yauchi (Women's Meijin, Mynavi Open), Ishibashi (Women's ōi). Shimizu given bye and Yauchi beat Ishibashi in Rd. 1. Shimizu then beat Yauchi in Rd. 2. |
| 59 | 2009 | **Rieko Yauchi**, Sachio Ishibashi and Ichiyo Shimizu, Kana Satomi | Yauchi (Mynavi Open), Ishibashi (Women's ōi), Shimizu (Women's Meijin, Women's ōshō), Satomi (Kurashiki Tōka). Yauchi beat Shimizu and Ishibashi beat Satomi in Rd. 1. Yauchi then beat Ishibashi in Rd. 2. |
| 60 | 2010 | **Ichiyo Shimizu**, **Kana Satomi** and Rieko Yauchi | Shimizu (Women's ōi, Women's ōshō), Satomi (Women's Meijin, Kurashiki Tōka), Yauchi (Mynavi Open). Double-elimination tournament used since two spots available: Yauchi lost first game to Satomi and second game to Shimizu. |
| 61 | 2011 | **Tomomi Kai** and Kana Satomi | Kai (Women's ōi, Mynavi Open), Satomi (Women's Meijin, Women's ōshō, Kurashiki Tōka) |
| 62 | 2012 | **Tomomi Kai** and Hatsumi Ueda | Kai (Women's ōi), Ueda (Mynavi Open) (Note: Remaining women's titleholders ineligible because they were apprentice professionals: Kana Satomi 3-crown (Women's Meijin, Kurashiki Tōka, Women's ōshō) and Momoko Katō (Women's ōza).) |
| 63 | 2013 | **Hatsumi Ueda** | Ueda (Mynavi Open) (Note: Remaining women's titleholders ineligible because they were apprentice professionals: Kana Satomi 4 Crown (Women's Meijin, Kurashiki Tōka, Women's ōshō, Women's ōi) and Momoko Katō (Women's ōza).) |
| 64 | 2014 | **Manao Kagawa** and Tomomi Kai | Kagawa (Women's ōshō), Kai (Women's ōi, Kurashiki Tōka). (Note: Remaining women's titleholder ineligible because she was a shōreikai member: Kana Satomi 3 Crown (Women's Meijin, Mynavi Open and Women's ōza)) |
| 65 | 2015 | **Tomomi Kai** and Manao Kagawa | Kai (Women's ōi, Kurashiki Tōka), Kagawa (Women's ōshō). (Note: Remaining women's titleholders ineligible because they were apprentice professionals: Kana Satomi 3 Crown (Women's Meijin, Kurashiki Tōka, Women's ōshō, Women's ōi) and Momoko Katō (Mynavi Open and Women's ōza)) |
| 66 | 2016 | **Momoko Katō** | Katō (Mynavi Open and Women's ōza). (Note: All of the major titles were held by two women: Katō and Kana Satomi 4 Crown (Women's Meijin, Kurashiki Tōka, Women's ōshō, Women's ōi) . Katō and Satomi are apprentice professionals and in past years would have been ineligible to participate, but the method for determining the women's entry for the 66th NHK Cup was changed from playoff to Japan Shogi Association recommendation.) |
| 67 | 2017 | **Momoko Katō**, Sae Itō, Yuki Muroya, Manao Kagawa, Shinobu Iwane and Ichiyo Shimizu | Katō (Mynavi Open) was the winner of a playoff tournament involving five other women's professionals. (Note: Katō was the only reigning title holder to participate in the playoff. Kana Satomi who holds the remaining five major titles elected not to participate. The other five women's professionals were all challengers for major titles during 2016.) |
| 68 | 2018 | **Momoko Katō**, Sae Itō and Hatsumi Ueda | Katō (Mynavi Open) was the winner of a playoff tournament involving two other women's professionals. |
| 69 | 2019 | **Kana Satomi**, Mana Watanabe and Tomoka Nishiyama | A two-round qualifying tournament involving women's major title holders Satomi (Women's Meijin, Kurashiki Tōka, Women's ōshō, Women's ōza), Watanabe (Women's ōi) and Nishiyama (Mynavi Open) was won by Satomi. Satomi given a bye, and Nishiyama defeated Watanabe in Rd. 1; Satomi then defeated Nishiyama in Rd. 2. (Note: Tomoka Nishiyama was officially categorized as an apprentice professional at the time and although she had won some women's major titles, she was not considered a women's professional.) |
| 70 | 2020 | **Tomoka Nishiyama** and Kana Satomi | Single game between the only two women's major title holders Satomi 4-crown and Nishiyama 3-crown won by Nishiyama. |
| 71 | 2021 | **Tomoka Nishiyama** and Kana Satomi | Single game between the only two women's major title holders Satomi 4-crown and Nishiyama 3-crown won by Nishiyama. |
| 72 | 2022 | **Kana Satomi**, Tomoka Nishiyama and Momoko Katō | A two-round qualifying tournament involving women's major title holders Satomi 5-crown, Nishiyama 2-crown and Katō Seirei was won by Satomi. Katō defeated Nishiyama in the first round, but then lost to Satomi in the second round. |
| 73 | 2023 | **Kana Satomi**, Tomoka Nishiyama and Sae Itō | A two-round qualifying tournament involving women's major title holders Satomi 5-crown, Nishiyama 2-crown and Itō Women's Meijin was won by Satomi. Nishiyama defeated Itō in the first round, but then lost to Satomi in the second round. |
| 74 | 2024 | **Tomoka Nishiyama** and Kana Fukuma | Single game between the only two women's major title holders Fukuma (née Satomi) 5-crown and Nishiyama 3-crown won by Nishiyama. |
| 75 | 2025 | **Tomoka Nishiyama** and Kana Fukuma | Single game between the only two women's major title holders Fukuma 5-crown and Nishiyama 3-crown won by Nishiyama. |
| 76 | 2026 | **Tomoka Nishiyama** and Kana Fukuma | Single game between the only two women's major title holders Fukuma 5-crown and Nishiyama 3-crown won by Nishiyama. |

== Broadcasts ==
=== Television ===
The tournament lasts roughly one year from April to the following March. Tournament games are televised each Sunday from 10:30 am to 12:00 pm Japan Standard Time (JST) on NHK Educational TV (NHK-E) and live commentary and analysis is provided by two commentators (shogi professionals): A women's professional who serves as the tournament's host and a professional who serves as the guest display board analyst.

The games are recorded in advance for broadcast at a later date. Before each game, the host briefly interviews each player and asks them about the upcoming game. The players typically sit across from each other seiza-style on zabutons placed on tatami mats in a Japanese-style room (the main studio set) while the two commentators stand before a display board in another studio. Although the player who moves first sits on the left (from the TV audience's perspective), the higher ranked player still takes the ōshō (king general) regardless of the result of the piece toss. Sitting parallel to board at a small table are the official time keeper and the official game score reader. Multiple cameras are used to provide overhead shots of the board, particularly when a player makes a move, wide shots or close-ups of both players when thinking and of the two commentators. In addition, special single-character shogi pieces are used so that they can easily be seen by television audience. Once a game has finished, the two commentators join the two players on the main set and post-game analysis takes place broadcast time permitting.

Women's professionals began serving as tournament hosts for the 41st NHK Cup (1991). The following table shows the hosts since 1991.

| Nos. | Years | Host |
|---|---|---|
| 41–43 | 1991–1993 | Harue Tanikawa |
| 44–46 | 1994–1996 | Kumi Yamada |
| 47–49 | 1997–1999 | Natsuko Fujimori |
| 50–52 | 2000–2002 | Akiko Nakakura |
| 53–55 | 2003–2005 | Ryoko Chiba |
| 56–58 | 2006–2008 | Hiromi Nakakura |
| 59–63 | 2009–2013 | Rieko Yauchi |
| 64–65 | 2014–2015 | Ichiyo Shimizu |
| 66–68 | 2016–2018 | Aya Fujita |
| 69–71 | 2019–2021 | Co-hosted by Aya Fujita and Momoko Nakamura |
| 72–73 | 2022–2023 | Co-hosted by Momoko Nakamura and Kanna Suzuki |
| 74–75 | 2024–2025 | Co-hosted by Kanna Suzuki and Yuki Muroya |
| 76– | 2026– | Co-hosted by Yuki Muroya and Aki Wada |

The tournament final is hosted by an NHK announcer. The two finalists are joined in a separate studio by the NHK announcer, the tournament's women's professional host and a guest analyst (or analysts) for interviews and some small talk. Each of the finalists is asked to comment on their play throughout the tournament and the upcoming final. The women's professional host and the guest analyst(s) are also asked to give their impressions of tournament and thoughts on the final. Everyone gathers again in the same studio after the final has finished for the awards ceremony where a NHK executive presents the winner with the NHK Cup (trophy) and a certificate, and the runner-up with a certificate. The NHK announcer then conducts some final interviews, and briefly previews the next NHK Cup before the broadcast ends.

=== Radio ===
From the 1st NHK Cup (1951) until the 11th NHK Cup (1961), the tournament was exclusively broadcast on NHK Radio. The radio broadcasts stopped, however, once the tournament switched to television in 1962 for the 12th NHK Cup.

The tournament returned to radio in 2011 when the final of the 60th NHK Cup was broadcast on NHK-1 Radio in honor of the 60th anniversary of the tournament. The program was hosted by an NHK announcer and commentary was provided by three professionals. NHK also created a website people could not only listen to the audio commentary, but could also follow the moves online. Even though the broadcast was not live, it proved to be fairly popular so NHK also did the same for the finals of both the 61st and 62nd NHK Cups as well. The player listed first was sente, and the winner's name is in bold.

| No. | Players | Broadcast Date | Host | Analyst |
|---|---|---|---|---|
| 60 | **Yoshiharu Habu** vs. Testurō Itodani | May 5, 2011 | Nobuo Murakami | Kunio Yonenaga, Akira Watanabe, Yasumitsu Satō |
| 61 | **Yoshiharu Habu** vs. Akira Watanabe | March 20, 2012 | Nobuo Murakami | Kuni Yonenaga, Kōji Tanigawa, Takanori Hashimoto |
| 62 | **Akira Watanabe** vs. Yoshiharu Habu | May 3, 2013 | Taiga Sekiguchi | Akira Shima, Kazuki Kimura, Takanori Hashimoto |

== Notable events ==
=== Habu beats four Meijins ===
In the 38th NHK Cup (1988), 18-year-old Yoshiharu Habu (at the time only a 5-dan), beat three former Meijin and the reigning Meijin in consecutive games on the way to his first NHK Cup championship. He defeated former Meijin Yasuharu Ōyama in Round 3, former Meijin Hifumi Katō in the quarterfinals, reigning Meijin Kōji Tanigawa in the semifinals and former Meijin Makoto Nakahara in the finals.

=== Women's professional wins ===
Hiroe Nakai became the first women's professional to win a NHK Cup game. She won her round 1 game of the 53rd NHK Cup (2003) against Mamoru Hatakeyama and then in round 2 won against Teruichi Aono (who was in Class A at the time). She lost in round 3 to Makoto Nakahara. The following year Nakai also qualified for the 54th NHK Cup (2004) and continued her high level of play by beating Shūji Satō in round 1. In round 2, Nakai faced Yasumitsu Satō who was the reigning Kisei title holder. Nakai obtained an advantageous position against Satō, but was unable to convert it into a win.

Momoko Katō became the second women's professional to win a NHK Cup game when she defeated Takuma Oikawa in Round 1 of the 68th NHK Cup on May 13, 2018. The following year, Kana Satomi became the third women's professional to win a NHK game when she defeated Issei Takazaki in Round 1 of the 69th NHK Cup on July 21, 2019. Satomi won for the second time when she defeated Kohei Funae in Round 1 of the 73rd NHK Cup on April 30, 2023. Tomoka Nishiyama defeated Kazuki Kimura in Round 1 of the 74th NHK Cup on June 23, 2024.

=== Same final four ===
The four semifinalists of the 59th NHK Cup (2009) were Yoshiharu Habu, Tetsurō Itodani, Tadahisa Maruyama and Akira Watanabe. Habu beat Maruyama in one semifinal and Itodani beat Watanabe in the other; Habu then beat Itodani in the final. The next year in the 60th NHK Cup (2010), the same four players also made it to the semifinals. This time Habu beat Watanabe and Itodani beat Maruyama to make it to the finals where Habu once again beat Itodani to win the championship.

=== Disqualifications ===
In Round 3 of the 46th NHK Cup (1996), Kenji Kobayashi lost on time to Nobuyuki Yashiki when he failed to complete his move within 30 seconds during byōyomi. Kobayashi picked up one of his pieces to make a move only to realize that said move would allow Yashiki to mate in one. Kobayashi tried to return the piece he was holding back to its original square and make a different move, but was unable to do so before the official time keeper for the game Hirotaka Nozuki (an apprentice 3-dan at the time) had counted to 30 and the time is up buzzer sounded. This is the only time that a player has lost a NHK Cup game on time.

Takahiro Toyokawa (6 dan at the time) in round 1 of the 54th NHK Cup (2004), Ayumu Matsuo (5 dan at the time) in round 1 of the 55th NHK Cup (2005) and Takanori Hashimoto (8 dan at the time) in the semifinals of the 64th NHK Cup (2014) each lost games for making an illegal move called nifu.

=== Two sennichite ===
In the 61st NHK Cup (2011), the Round 1 game between Takuya Nagase (sente) and Yasumitsu Satō (gote) ended in sennichite. Sente and gote were switched and the game was replayed. The second game also ended in sen'nichite. Sente and gote were switched again and a third game was played between the two which Nagase won.

=== Student vs. teacher ===
A young amateur player aspiring to become a professional typically asks a more experienced professional to formally become their sponsor (i.e., teacher/mentor) and help them through the process. In some cases, the "student" may even decide to go live with their "teacher" and family. There have been two occasions in NHK Cup play where a student has played their teacher, and on both occasions the student won: Tatsuya Sugai beat Keita Inoue in round 2 of the 61st NHK Cup (2011) and Daisuke Nakagawa beat Kunio Yonenaga in quarterfinals of the 45th NHK Cup (1995).
