= Kana Fukuma =

Japanese shogi player (born 1992)

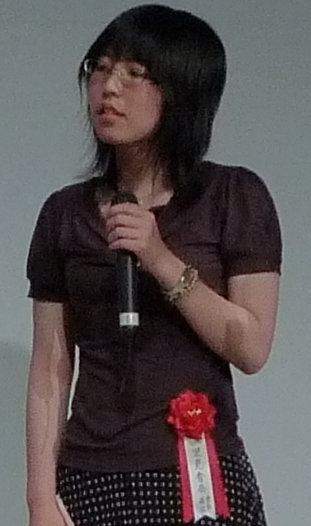
- Satomi at a shogi event in August 2009.
- Native name: 福間香奈
- Maiden name: Satomi (里見)
- Born: March 2, 1992 (age 34)
- Hometown: Izumo, Shimane

Career
- Achieved professional status: October 1, 2004 (aged 12)
- Badge number: W-33
- Rank: Women's 6-dan
- Teacher: Keiji Mori (9-dan)
- Current titles held: Women's Ōi; Kurashiki Tōka; Women's Ōza; Jo-Ō
- Lifetime titles: Queen Meijin; Queen Ōshō; Queen Kurashiki Tōka; Queen Ōi; Queen Ōza; Queen Seirei
- Major titles won: 69

Websites
- JSA profile page

Kana Fukuma (福間 香奈, Fukuma Kana; (née Satomi (里見)) born March 2, 1992) is a Japanese women's professional shogi player ranked 6-dan. She is the current holder of the Women's Ōi, Women's Ōza, Kurashiki Tōka Cup, and Jo-Ō titles. As of August 2026, she is also the career leader in women's professional shogi major titles.

Satomi is also the first female to have been promoted to Japan Shogi Association's rank of apprentice professional of 3-dan and is also the first women's professional to apply for and be allowed to take the Japan Shogi Association's Professional Admission Test.

== Early life, amateur shogi, apprentice women's shogi professional ==
Satomi was born in Izumo, Shimane on March 2, 1992. In 2003, she represented Shimane Prefecture in the 28th Elementary Student Meijin Tournament as a fifth-grade elementary school student, and advanced to the semifinals before losing to future shogi professional Takuya Nishida.

Later in 2003, Satomi entered the Japan Shogi Association's Women's Professional Apprentice League under the guidance of shogi professional Keiji Mori. She was awarded the rank of women's professional 2-kyū in October 2004.

== Women's shogi professional ==
In September 2008, Satomi defeated Tomomi Kai to in the final of the 16th Kurashiki Tōka Cup challenger tournament to advance to the best-of-three title match against Ichiyo Shimizu. Satomi's victory over Kai also meant that she satisfied the criteria for promotion to women's professional 2-dan. Satomi went on to defeat Shimizu 2 games to none to win her first major title. Satomi successfully defended her title from 2009 (17th Kurashiki Tōka Cup) until 2012 (20th Kurashiki Tōka Cup). Satomi's victory in 2012 qualified her for the lifetime title of "Queen Kurashiki Toka", thus making her at 20 years old the youngest women's professional to ever qualify for a lifetime title. Satomi lost to Kai 2 games to 1 in the final of the 21st Kurashiki Tōka Cup in November 2013, but recaptured the title from Kai in November 2015 by the score of 2 games to none in the 23rd Kurashiki Tōka Cup. She successfully defended her title in both 2016 (24th Kurashiki Tōka Cup) and 2017 (25th Kurashiki Tōka Cup).

In June 2018, Satomi lost her Women's Ōi title to challenger Mana Watanabe 3 games to 1 in the 29th Women's Ōi title match. The two met again the following year in the 30th Women's Ōi title match (May–June 2019), and Satomi regained her title 3 games to 1. The victory was Satomi's fifth Women's Ōi title overall, which not only returned her to 5-crown title holder (五冠, go kan) status, but also earned her the lifetime title "Queen Ōi".

In February 2019, Satomi defended her Women's Meijin title against Sae Itō, winning the 45th Women's Meijin match 3 games to 1. Satomi's win was the tenth consecutive time she's won the Meijin title, which tied the record for consecutive wins of a women's title set by Naoko Hayashiba in 1991.

Satomi earned the right to challenge Tomoka Nishiyama for the 12th Women's Jo-Ō title in April–May 2019, but Nishiyama defended her title 3 games to 1.

In September 2019, Satomi defeated Kai 3 games to none to win the inaugural Seirei tournament. The win made Satomi the first 6-crown title holder in women's professional shogi. Satomi, however, was only able to retain her 6-crown status for about two months and dropped back down to 5-crown status after losing the 41st Women's Ōshō title to Nishiyama 2 games to 1.

In November 2019, Satomi defended her Kurashiki Tōka title by defeating Itō 2 games to 1 in the 27th Kurashiki Tōka title match.

In October–December 2019, Satomi defended her Women's Ōza title against Nishiyama, the third time in six months the two met in a major title match. Satomi lost the 9th Women's Ōza match 3 games to 1 to drop back to a 4-crown title holder status.

Satomi won the Women's Meijin title for the eleventh consecutive time when she defeated Yuki Taniguchi 3 games to none to win the 46th Women's Meijin match. The victory also gave Satomi sole possession of the record for the most consecutive wins of a women's major title.

In June 2020, Satomi successfully defended her Women's Ōi crown by defeating Momoko Katō 3 games to none.

In July–August 2020, Satomi defeated Hatsumi Ueda 3 games to 2 to win the 2nd Seirei title match. Satomi won the first two games, lost the next two, but came back to win the final game of the match and defend her title.

In November 2020, Satomi successfully defended her Kurashiki Tōka title by defeating Hiroe Nakai 2 games to none to win the 28th Kurashiki Tōka title.

Satomi defended her Women's Meijin title for the twelfth consecutive time when she defeated Momoko Katō 3 games to none to win the 47th Women's Meijin title match in January–February 2021. The victory gave Satomi her 43rd women's major title overall which tied her with Ichiyo Shimizu for the most ever.

Satomi successfully defended her Women's Ōi crown in June 2021 by defeating Kotomi Yamane 3 games to none to win the 32nd Women's Ōi title match. The victory was Satomi's 44th major title and made her the all-time Women's professional shogi major title leader. She returned to 5-crown status in November 2021 after defeating Nishiyama 2 games to 1 to win the 43rd Women's Ōshō title. Later that same month, however, she was unable to defend her Seirei title against Katō and lost the 3rd Seirei title match (September–November 2021) 3 games to 2. Satomi and Katō also faced each other in the best-of-three 29th Kurashiki Tōka Cup title match (November 2021) with Satomi winning 2 games to 1 for her twelfth Kurashiki Tōka Cup title overall. A few weeks later, Satomi returned to 5-crown status after defeating Nishiyama in the 11th Ōza title match (October–December 2021) 3 games to none. The win was Satomi's fifth Ōza title overall which qualified her for the "Queen Ōza" title.

In February 2022, Satomi lost the 47th Women's Meijin title (January–February 2022) to Itō 3 games to 1. It was the first time since 2009 that she was unable to successfully defend her Women's Meiiin title.

Satomi successfully defended her Women's Ōi title in June 2022 by defeating Nishiyama 3 games to 1 to win the 33rd Women's Ōi title match (April–June 2022). In April–June 2022, she also challenged Nishiyama for the latter's Jo-Ō in the 15th Mynavi Women's Open title match, but Nishiyama won the match 3 games to 2 to defend her title. Satomi, however, did recapture the Seirei title by defeating Katō in the 4th Seirei Title Match (July–August 2022) 3 games to none to return to 5-crown status.

On October 21, 2022, Satomi returned to 6-crown status after defeating Nishiyama in the best-of-seven 2nd Hakurei title match (August–October 2022) 4 games to 3. The win was Satomi's 50th major title overall. Satomi's return to 6-crown status, however, was short-lived after she lost the 34th Women's Ōshō title match (October 2022) a week later to Nishiyama 3 games to 2. Satomi and Nishiyama faced each other yet again in a major title match a few days later with Nishiyama challenging Satomi for her Kurashiki Tōka Cup title. This time, Satomi was able to successfully defend her title by winning the 30th Kurashiki Tōka Cup title match (November 2022) 2 games to none. A few weeks later on December 23, 2022, Satomi successfully defended her Women's Ōza title by defeating Katō 3 games to 2 in the 12th Women's Ōza title match (October–December 2022).

In June 2023, Satomi defended her Women's Ōi when she defeated Itō 3 games to 1 in the 34th Women's Ōi title match (April–June 2023). Satomi then successfully defended her Seirei title by defeating Nishiyama in the 5th Seirei title match (July–August 2023) 3 games to 1. Satomi, however, was unable to defend her Hakurei title and dropped back down to 4-crown status after losing the 3rd Hakurei title match (September–October 2023) to Nishiyama 4 games to 3. Satomi faced Nishiyama in a major title match for the third time in 2023 and defended her Kurashiki Tōka Cup title by winning the 31st Kurashiki Tōka Cup title match (November 2023) 2 games to none. The following month, Satomi successfully defended her Women's Ōza title by defeating Katō 3 games to 1 in the 13th Women's Ōza title match. The victory gave Satomi her third consecutive and seventh overall Women's Ōza title.

In February 2024, Fukuma recaptured the Women's Meijin title by defeating reigning title holder Nishiyama 3 games to 1 to win the 50th Women's Meijin match (January–February 2024). The victory gave Fukuma her 13th Women's Meijin title overall, and her first since playing under her married name.

In May 2024, Fukuma successfully defended her Women's Ōi title by defeating challenger Katō 3 games to 0 in the 35th Women's Ōi Title Match (April–May 2024); it was Fukuma's sixth consecutive Women's Ōi title. Fukuma and Katō met again a few months later in the 6th Seirei title match (July–August 2024), but Fukuma won the match 3 games to 1. The victory was Fukuma's 5th Seirei title overall which qualified her for the "Queen Seirei" title.

In September–October 2024, Fukuyama challenged Nishiyama for the Hakurei and Women's Ōshō titles, but poor heath caused her to forfeit several games in each match. She was tied with Nishiyama at two wins apiece in the 4th Hakurei title match but forfeited Games 5 and 6 to lose the match 4 games to 2. In the 46th Women's Ōshō title match (October 2024), she won Game 1 but forfeited Games 2 and 3 to lose the match 2 games to 1.

Fukuma faced Nishiyama again in the 14th Women's Ōza title match (October 2024 and February–March 2025). Game 1 of the match was played in October 2024, and was won by Fukuma. Games 2 and 3, however, were postponed because Fukuma was scheduled to take an official leave of absence due to being pregnant, and the match was scheduled to restart in February 2025. Fukuma won Games 2 and 3 to win the match 3 games to none, defend her Women's Ōza title and retain her 5-crown status. Fukuma continued her good form after returning from her leave of absence by defeating Itō 2 games to 0 to win the 32nd Kurashiki Tōka Cup (February–March 2025) title match to defend her title and maintain her 5-crown status, and then defeating Nishiyama 3 games to 2 to win the 51st Women's Meijin title match (March–April 2025) to defend her Meijin title.

Fukuma captured the Women's Mynabi Open Jo-Ō title and returned to 6-crown status after defeating Nishiyama 3 games to 2 to win the 18th Women's Mynavi Open (April–June 2025). She successfully defended her Women's Ōi title by defeating Itō 3 games to 2 in the 36th Women's Ōi title match (April–June 2025). Fukuma was originally scheduled to defend her title against Nishiyama, but Nishiyama withdrew due to illness on the advice of her doctor the day before the match was scheduled to begin and was replaced by Itō, who lost to Nishiyama in the finals of the challenger determination tournament the previous March. Fukuma's string of successful title defenses in 2025 continued when she defeated Watanabe 3 games to none to win the 7th Seirei Title Match (July–August 2025) and maintain her 6-crown status.

Fukuma's string of success in major title matches since returning from her leave of absence ended in October 2025 when she lost the 5th Hakurei title match (September–October 2025) to Nishiyama 4 games to 2. Fukuma was leading the match 2 games to 1 but lost the next three games to not only fail to recapture the Hakurei title but also fail to become the first ever women's professional 7-crown title holder. She regained her winning form, however, in her next two major title defenses. First she defeated Itō 2 games to 1 to win the 33rd Kurashiki Tōka Title Match (November 2025) and defend her Kurashiki Tōka title, and she then defeated Nishiyama 3 games to none to win the 15th Women's Ōza Title Match (October–November 2025) and defend her Women's Ōza title.

In February 2026, Fukuma dropped to 5-crown title holder status after losing the 52nd Women's Meijin title match to Nishiyama 3 games to none; it was the first time in 85 major title matches that Fukuma failed to win at least one game. Fukuma, however, successfully defended her 5-crown status in her next two major title defenses: first she defeated Ayaka Ōshima 3 games to none in the 37th Women's Ōi Title Match (April–May 2026) and then defeated Nishiyama 3 games to 2 in the 19th Mynavi Women's Open (April–May 2026). Fukuma's reign as Seirei title holder came to an end in August 2026 when she lost the 8th Seirei Title Match (July–August 2026) to Nishiyama 3 games to 1; the loss dropped Fukuma back to 4-crown status and moved Nishiyama up to 4-crown status. Fukuma and Nishiyama met in major title match for the fourth time in 2026 when she challenged Nishiyama for the 6th Hakurei Title (August–October 2026); Fukuma, however, lost the match 4 games to 1.

=== Promotion history ===
Fukuma has been promoted as follows.

- 2-kyū: October 1, 2004
- 1-kyū: April 1, 2006
- 1-dan: February 22, 2007
- 2-dan: September 29, 2008
- 3-dan: April 1, 2009
- 4-dan: February 10, 2010
- 5-dan: October 18, 2011
- 6-dan: April 1, 2020

Note: All ranks are women's professional ranks.

=== Major titles ===
Satomi has appeared in major title matches 89 times and has won a total of 69 titles. She has won the Women's Meijin fourteen times, the Kurashiki Tōka Cup title sixteen times, the Women's Ōshō title eight times, the Women's Ōi title twelve times, the Women's Ōza title nine times, the Seirei title six times, the Jo-Ō title three times and the Hakurei title once. She has been awarded the lifetime titles of Queen Meijin, Queen Ōshō, Queen Kurashiki Tōka, Queen Ōi and Queen Seirei. In September 2019, she became the first 6-crown title holder in women's professional shogi.

Title	Years	Number of times overall
Women's Meijin	2009–2020 and 2023–2024	14
Kurashiki Tōka Cup	2008–2012 and 2015–2025 (current)	16
Women's Ōshō	2010–2012, 2015–2018 and 2021	8
Women's Ōi	2012, 2015–2017 and 2019–2026 (current)	12
Women's Ōza	2013, 2016–2018 and 2021–2025 (current)	9
Jo-Ō	2013 and 2025–2026 (current)	3
Seirei	2019–2020 and 2022–2025	6
Hakurei	2022	1

=== Awards and honors ===
Fukuma has received a number of Japan Shogi Association Annual Shogi Awards and other awards in recognition of her accomplishments in shogi and contributions made to Japanese society.

==== Annual Shogi Awards ====
- 34th Annual Awards (April 2006 – March 2007): Women's Professional Award
- 36th Annual Awards (April 2008 – March 2009): Women's Professional Award
- 37th Annual Awards (April 2009 – March 2010): Women's Professional of the Year
- 38th Annual Awards (April 2010 – March 2011): Women's Professional of the Year
- 39th Annual Awards (April 2011 – March 2012): Women's Professional of the Year
- 40th Annual Awards (April 2012 – March 2013): Women's Professional of the Year and Game of the Year Special Prize
- 41st Annual Awards (April 2013 – March 2014): Women's Professional of the Year
- 43rd Annual Awards (April 2015 – March 2016): Women's Professional of the Year
- 44th Annual Awards (April 2016 – March 2017): Women's Professional of the Year and Game of the Year Special Prize
- 45th Annual Awards (April 2017 – March 2018): Women's Professional of the Year
- 46th Annual Awards (April 2018 – March 2019): Women's Professional of the Year and Women's Professional Game of the Year
- 47th Annual Awards (April 2019 – March 2020): Women's Professional of the Year and Women's Game of the Year
- 48th Annual Awards (April 2020 – March 2021): Women's Professional of the Year and Women's Professional Game of the Year
- 49th Annual Awards (April 2021 – March 2022): Women's Professional of the Year and Women's Professional Game of the Year
- 50th Annual Shogi Awards (April 2022 – March 2023): Women's Professional of the Year and Women's Professional Game of the Year
- 51st Annual Shogi Awards (April 2023 – March 2024): Women's Professional of the Year and Women's Professional Game of the Year
- 52nd Annual Shogi Awards (April 2024 – March 2025): Women's Professional of the Year and Women's Professional Game of the Year

==== Other awards ====
- 2007, March: Shimane Prefecture Cultural Activity Award
- 2010, March: Shimane Prefecture Meritorious Person Award

=== Notable results against regular professionals ===
On June 28, 2019, Satomi defeated shogi professional Ryūma Tonari in the preliminary round of the 91st Kisei tournament to become the first women's professional to win four consecutive official games against regular professionals. She was, however, unable to extend winning streak to five games when she lost to Takahiro Ōhashi in her next game against a regular professional. On July 21, 2019, Satomi became just the third women's professional to win a NHK Cup TV Tournament game against a male professional when she defeated Issei Takazaki in Round 1 of the tournament.

On May 27, 2022, Satomi defeated Yūta Komori in the preliminary round of the 48th Kiō tournament to become the first women's professional to qualify for the main challenger tournament of a major title. Her record against regular professionals after this win improved to 10 wins and 4 losses over the last 14 games, satisfying the criteria to qualify for the Professional Admission Test. In addition to Komori, the regular professionals Satomi defeated during this period included former Kiō challenger Kei Honda, B1 class professional Shingo Sawada, and 2022 Ōi league winner Takashi Ikenaga. Satomi is the first women's professional to qualify for the Professional Admission Test.

On October 6, 2025, Fukuma defeated Masahiko Urano in a preliminary round game of the 67th Ōi tournament to improve her record against regular professionals in recent official games to 10 wins and 5 losses for a winning percentage of 0.666. The win meant Fukuma satisfied the criteria for the Professional Admission Test (10 or more wins with a winning percentage of 0.650 or better over the best span of recent official games against regular professionals) for a second time. After the game, Fukuma stated she was "very happy just be able to play an official game against a regular professional and was not thinking about the test very much". She also stated she wanted to "let the accomplishment sink in a bit before deciding what to do next".

As of November 5, 2025, Fukuma's record in official regular professional tournaments is 64 wins and 75 losses for a winning percentage of 0.460.

== Apprentice professional ==
In April 2011, Satomi, who was already quite successful as a women's shogi professional, informed the Japan Shogi Association of her desire to enter its apprentice school at the rank of apprentice professional 1-kyū in an attempt to obtain full professional status. A series of three official games against existing shogi apprentices were arranged as her entrance exam. She split the first two games held on May 3, 2011, but then won the third game on May 21, 2011, to pass the exam. She was awarded the rank of apprentice 1-kyū that same day.

In January 2012, Satomi became the first female under the current apprentice system to be promoted to the rank of apprentice 1-dan after she achieved the threshold of 12 wins and 4 losses in apprentice school play. In July 2013, Satomi then became the first female to be promoted to apprentice 2-dan after once again reaching 12 wins and 4 losses. In December of that same year, she became the first female to be promoted to apprentice 3-dan, thus earning her the right to be the first female to participate in the 3-Dan League: the final stage for those aspiring to be awarded regular professional status.

Satomi's first season of 3-dan league play was supposed to be the 55th 3-dan League (April–September 2014), but health issues forced her to take a leave of absence from all professional games from April 1, 2014, until August 31, 2014. Satomi's health problems did not improve, so her leave of absence was subsequently extended to December 31, 2014; this meant she would miss the 56th (October 2014 – March 2015) 3-dan League as well. On November 10, 2014, the JSA announced that Satomi would be returning to official women's professional shogi play as of January 1, 2015, but that she was being allowed to withdraw from the 57th (April–October 2015) 3-dan league.

Satomi's returned from her leave of absence for the 58th (October 2015 – March 2016) 3-dan League, and finished with a losing record of 5 wins and 13 losses. Her records in the 59th (April–September 2016), 60th (October 2016 – March 2017) and 61st (April–September 2017) 3-dan Leagues were 7–11, 8–10 and 7–11 respectively.

Satomi was already 25 years old when she started 62nd (October 2017 – March 2018) 3-dan league play which meant she needed to either win the league outright and obtain full professional status, or finish with a winning record (10 wins) to avoid losing her qualifications for the apprentice school due to the 26-year-old age limit set in place by the JSA. Satomi's record after twelve games was 7 wins and 5 losses, so it seemed like she might be able to qualify for a one-season extension to continue her attempt for full professional status. However, she proceeded to lose her next four games which meant the best she could finish was 9 wins and 9 losses, which confirmed that she would have to leave the apprentice school. The option of becoming a "regular" professional via the Professional Admission Test remains open to her, and her leaving the apprentice school does not affect her status as a women's professional player.

== Professional Admission Test ==
=== First attempt (August–October 2022) ===
On June 28, 2022, the JSA announced that it had accepted Satomi's application for the Professional Admission Test. Satomi was the first woman to be accepted for the test. She satisfied the criteria for the test the previous month when she defeated a regular professional in the official tournament play. Satomi's test consisted of a best-of-five test match against the five most recently promoted regular professionals with Satomi needing to win three of the five games to be awarded regular professional status as a "Free Class" professional. The schedule was for one game to be played a month starting in August 2022, under official game conditions.

The five professionals Satomi was scheduled to play were Kenshi Tokuda (Game 1), Reo Okabe (Game 2), Mikio Kariyama (Game 3), Tomoki Yokoyama (Game 4) and Akihiro Takada (Game 5). The time control for each game was three hours per player which was then followed a byoyomi time control of thirty seconds per move. A furigoma was held prior to Game 1 to determine who moved first, and then the first move alternated between players for the remaining games so that Satomi would never move first or second for two consecutive games. The games were scheduled to take place at the JSA headquarters in Tokyo and its Kansai Branch in Osaka. Game 1 took place on August 18 in Osaka with Tokuda moving first and ultimately winning in 127 moves. Game 2 took place in Tokyo on September 22, with Satomi moving first. Despite having the advantage of the first move, Satomi lost the game in 132 moves. Game 3 took place in Osaka on October 13 with Satomi needing to win to have any chance of being promoted; Satomi lost the game in 103 moves which meant she had failed the test, thus making Games 4 and 5 unnecessary.

=== Second attempt (January–March 2026) ===
On November 4, 2025, the JSA posted on its official website that it had received and approved Fukuma's application to take the test a second time. The JSA posted that the best-of-five test would start two months after receiving Fukuma's application, with one game being played per month at either the JSA headquarters in Tokyo or its Kansai Branch office until the final result has been decided. Fukuma's five opponents during the test would be the five most recent shogi professionals: Kazuki Yamashita (Game 1), Shiryū Katayama (Game 2), Hiroto Ikegaki (Game 3), Rintarō Iwamura (Game 4, if necessary) and Toshiki Sumisaki (Game 5, if necessary).

Game 1 against Yamashita was held at the JSA's Kansai Branch office on January 27, 2026; Fukuma lost the game in 108 moves. Game 2 against Katayama was held on February 16, 2026, at the JSA's headquarters in Tokyo: Fukuma lost the game in 115 moves. Game 3 of the test against Ikegami was played on March 27, 2026, at the Kansai Branch office; Fukuma lost the game in 88 moves, which meant she had failed the test for the second time. At the press conference following the game, Fukuma stated "she did the best she could but just was not strong enough" to pass the test. When asked whether she would try to take the test for a third time, she responded, "Part of me wants to try again, but passing it would be difficult given my current strength level", and further stated, "her goal is to keep getting stronger by playing against stronger players as much as she can".

== Personal life ==
Satomi's younger sister Saki is also a women's professional shogi player. The two are the third pair of sisters to be awarded women's professional status by the JSA.

On January 1, 2024, the JSA posted on its official website that Satomi had gotten married during 2023 and would now be competing under her married name Fukuma (福間). In a Chūnichi Shimbun article published later that same day, it was further revealed that she had married former apprentice professional 3-dan Kenta Fukuma.

On August 29, 2024, the JSA posted on its official website that Fukuma's upcoming challenge to Nishiyama in the 4th Hakurei title match would be played using a table–chairs set-up instead of seiza-style, and without either player wearing traditional Japanese clothing, such as kimonos, out of concern for Fukuma's health due to her pregnancy. Fukuma had requested such a special allowance be made after consulting with her doctor.

On October 4, 2024, the JSA announced on its official website that Fukuma would be on an official leave of absence from November 17, 2024, until February 12, 2025. The JSA also announced on the same day that Game 1 of Fukuma's 14th Women's Ōza title match against Nishiyama would be played as scheduled on October 23, but Game 2 and Game 3 would be postponed until after Fukuma returned from her leave of absence. The JSA subsequently announced on November 1, 2024, Fukuma's defense her Kurashiki Tōka title against Itō in the 32nd Kurashiki Tōka title match scheduled to begin on November 7 had also been postponed to the end of February 2025. The best-of-three match's schedule had already been shortened to last only six days, and all the games were scheduled to take place in Osaka in consideration of Fukuma's health and ensure it was completed before her scheduled leave of absence began on November 17.

On January 1, 2025, Fukuma announced on X as part of New Year's greeting she had safely given birth to her first child in the middle of December. She stated she was sorry for any inconvenience her leave of absence might have caused but was grateful for all of the understanding and support she received, and she also hoped that systematic changes would be made in the future to make things more accommodating for women's professionals trying to balance their playing careers with starting a family.
