= Tomoka Nishiyama =

Japanese shogi player (born 1995)

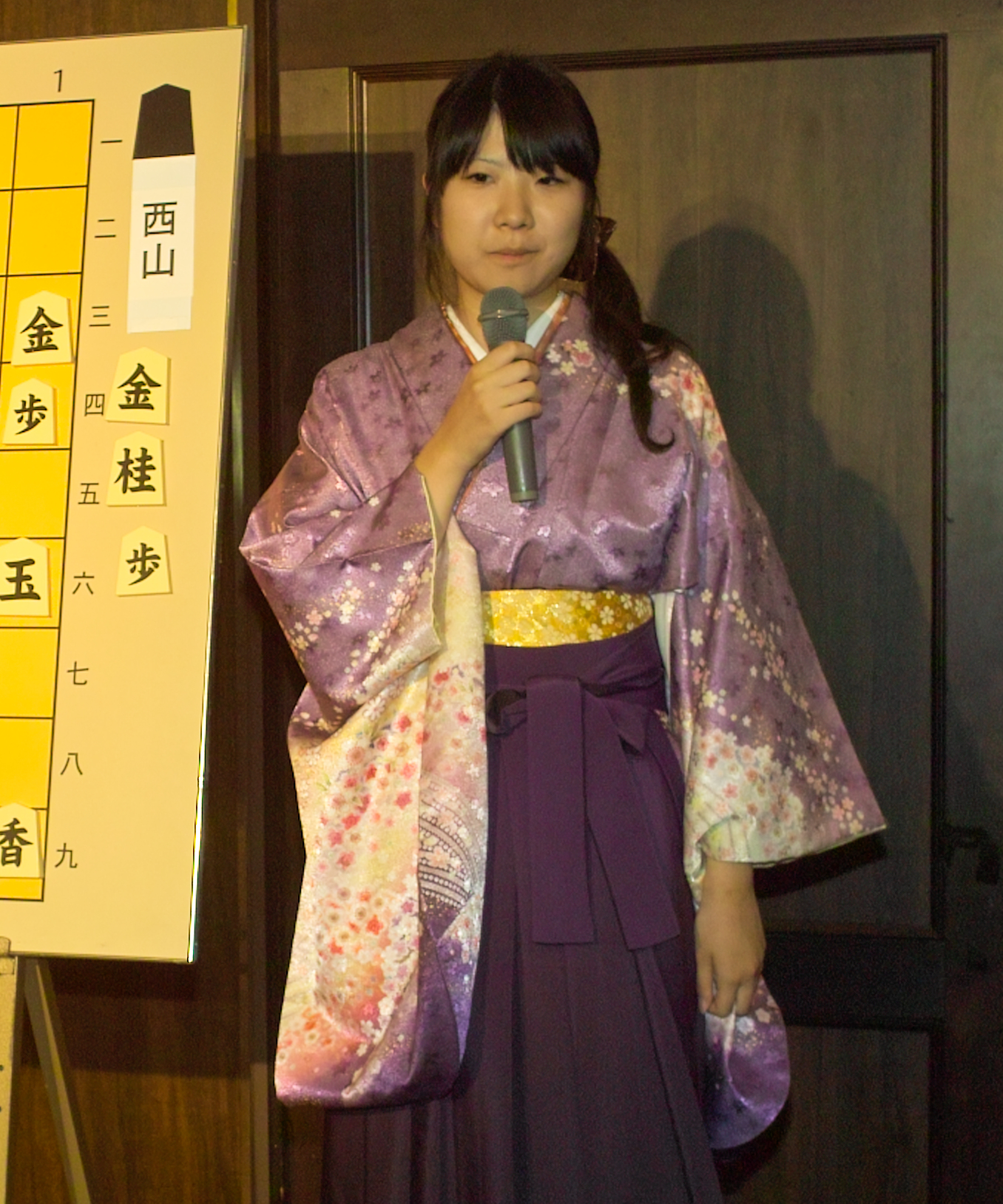
- Nishiyama in 2014
- Native name: 西山朋佳
- Born: June 27, 1995 (age 31)
- Hometown: Ōsakasayama, Osaka

Career
- Achieved professional status: April 1, 2021 (aged 25)
- Badge number: W-73
- Rank: Women's 5-dan
- Teacher: Hirofumi Itō (7-dan)
- Current titles held: Women's Ōshō; Hakurei; Women's Meijin; Seirei
- Lifetime titles: Lifetime Jo-Ō; Queen Ōshō; Queen Hakurei
- Major titles won: 24

Websites
- JSA profile page

Tomoka Nishiyama (西山 朋佳, Nishiyama Tomoka; born June 27, 1995) is a Japanese women's professional shogi player ranked 5-dan. She is the current holder of the Women's Ōshō, Hakurei, Women's Meijin, and Seirei titles as well as a former holder of the Jo-Ō and Women's Ōza titles. She is the first female to qualify for and be awarded regular professional status by the Japan Shogi Association.

== Early life, amateur shogi and education ==
Nishiyama was born on June 27, 1995, in Ōsakasayama, Osaka. She first was exposed to shogi as a three-year-old by watching her father and older sister play but really learned how to play the game as a five-year-old first-grade elementary school student. She soon started attending a neighborhood shogi school three times a week and playing practice games on the Internet. In 2009, she won the girls' division of the 30th All Japan Junior High School Student Shogi Championship as a junior high school second-grade student and thereafter was accepted into the Japan Shogi Association's training group in Osaka. Nishiyama quickly progressed through the training group system and was eventually accepted into the JSA's apprentice school at the rank of 6-kyū under the tutelage of shogi professional Hirofumi Itō.

After high school, Nishiyama moved to Tokyo to study environmental informatics at Keio University, but she has been on a leave of absence to focus on shogi since 2015.

== Apprentice shogi professional ==
Nishiyama was promoted to the rank of apprentice professional 1-dan in January 2014, becoming just the second woman to achieve that rank after Kana Satomi. Later that same year in September 2014, she became the second woman to be promoted to the rank of apprentice professional 2-dan (once again after Satomi). Nishiyama was 19 years and 2 months old when she was promoted, thus breaking Satomi's record of 21 years and 4 months. In December 2015, Nishiyama was promoted to the rank of apprentice professional 3-dan, thus becoming the second woman (yet again following Satomi) to achieve such a rank. At age 20 years and 5 months, she also broke Satomi's record of 21 years and 9 months. With Satomi having to leave the 3-dan league in 2018, Nishiyama is now the only woman competing in the league as of August 2019.

Nishiyama finished the 66th 3-dan League (October 2019 – March 2020) in third place with a record of 14 wins and 4 losses. Going into the last day of league play, Nishiyama was in provisional third place with a record of 12 wins and 4 losses, trailing Hiroki Taniai (13 wins and 3 losses) and Shinichirō Hattori (12 wins and 4 losses). Since Nishiyama's league seed was the lowest of the three, she needed to win both of her games and finish at least one game ahead of one of the other two to obtain automatic promotion to the rank of professional 4-dan. Taniai lost one of his two games, but Hatori and Nishiyama won both of theirs which meant that all three finished league play with the same record. Although Nishiyama missed out on being promoted due to her lower seed, her result was good enough to earn her a promotion point for future league play and means she needs only one more promotion point to qualify for full-professional status.

On April 1, 2021, the JSA announced that it had accepted Nishiyama's request to leave the apprenticeship school and become a women's professional under its affiliation. Nishiyama posted a message to her fans and supporters on her personal Twitter earlier that same day which thanked them for their support and explained that she decided to make the switch after giving the matter long consideration. The end of her career as an apprentice professional means she now only be able to become a regular shogi professional via the Professional Admissions Test available to qualifying amateurs and women professionals. On the other hand, it also means that she could now complete in all tournaments and title matches open to women's professional, and not only those in which apprentice professionals were allowed to participate.

=== Apprentice professional promotion history ===
Nishiyama's promotion history as an apprentice professional is as follows.

- 6-kyū: 2010
- 1-dan: January 2014
- 2-dan: September 2014
- 3-dan: December 2015
- Leaves apprentice professional school to become women's professional: March 31, 2021
- Note: Ranks are apprentice professional ranks.

== Women's shogi professional ==
Nishiyama's first appearance came in a women's major title match came in 2014 when she challenged fellow apprentice shogi professional Momoko Katō for the 4th Women's Ōza title, but she lost the match 3 games to none.

Nishiyama and Katō met again in May 2018 in the 11th Women's Myavi Open Tournament and its Jo-Ō title. Nishiyama defeated the defending Jo-Ō Katō 3 games to 1 to win her first major title match. Nishiyama's victory also made her the second apprentice professional after Katō to win a women's professional shogi major title. Nishiyama successfully defended her Jo-Ō title the following year when she defeated women's professional shogi player Kana Satomi 3 games to 1 in May 2019.

Nishiyama challenged Satomi for 41st Ōshō title in October–November 2019. She won the first game of the match, lost the second, but won the deciding third game to capture the title 2 games to 1. The victory made her a 2-crown title holder (二冠, Ni kan) for the first time.

In October–December 2019, Nishiyama and Satomi met in the 9th Women's Ōza title match, their third major title match in six months. Nishiyama won the match 3 games to 1 to capture another of Satomi's titles and also become a 3-crown title holder for the first time.

In June 2020, Nishiyama successfully defended her Jo-Ō title by defeating Momoko Katō 3 games to 2 to win the 13th Women's Myavi Open Tournament. That same year in October, she defended her Women's Ōshō title by defeating Yuki Muroya 3 games to 2 in the 42nd Women's Ōshō title match. Two months later in December, she successfully defended her Women's Ōza title by defeating Satomi 3 games to 2.

In her first major title defense since leaving the JSA's apprentice school and officially changing her status to women's professional, Nishiyama defeated Sae Itō 3 games to 2 to win the 14th Women's Myavi Open Tournament and retain her Jo-Ō title in June 2021.

Nishiyama defeated Mana Watanabe 4 games to none to win the 1st Hakurei title in September–October 2021. The victory made Nishiyama a Women's 4-crown title holder and the first prize of JPY 15,000,000, the biggest winner's prize in women's professional shogi. In October–November 2021, Nishiyama defended her Women's Ōshō title against Satomi, but lost the 43rd Ōshō title match 2 games to 1 to drop back to 3-crown status. Nishiyama was also unsuccessful in her Ōza title defense against Satomi in the 11th Ōza title match (October–December 2021) in 2021; this time Nishiyama lost the match 3 games to none.

In April–June 2022, Nishiyama challenged Satomi for the 33rd Women's Ōi title but was defeated 3 games to 1. Nishiyama and Satomi also faced each other in the 15th Mynavi Women's Open title match (April–June 2022) with Nishiyama winning the best-of-five series 3 games to 2. By defending her Jo-Ō title and winning the tournament for the fifth consecutive time, Nishiyama became the first women's professional to qualify for the "Lifetime Jo-Ō" title. Nishiyama's victory also secured her promotion to the rank of women's professional 4-dan.

In August–October 2022, Nishiyama faced Satomi once again in 2nd Hakurei title match. This time, however, Satomi came out on top and won the match 4 games to 3 to capture Nishiyama's Hakurei title. Nishiyama, however, returned to 2-crown status a week later when she defeated Satomi in Game 3 of the 34th Women's Ōshō title match (October 2022) on October 28, 2022, to win the match 2 games to 1 and recapture the Women's Ōshō title. The two players faced each other yet again in a major title match a few days later with Nishiyama challenging Satomi for her Kurashiki Tōka Cup title. This was Nishiyama's first appearance in the Kurashiki Tōka Cup title match, but her title challenge was unsuccessful and she lost the 30th Kurashiki Tōka Cup title match (November 2022) 2 games to none.

Nishiyama won the Women's Meijin title for the first time in February 2023 when she defeated reigning Women's Meijin Itō 3 games to 1 to win the 49th Women's Meijin title match. It was the first time Nishyama had challenged for the Women's Meijin title. In May 2023, she successfully defended her Mynavi Women's Open Jo-Ō title by defeating Tomomi Kai 3 games to none in 16th Mynavi Women's Open title match to win the title for the sixth consecutive year. A few months later, Nishiyama challenged Satomi for the Seirei title, but lost the 5th Seirei title match (July–August 2023) 3 games to 1.

In October 2023, Nishiyama successfully defended her Women's Ōshō title by defeating Manao Kagawa 2 games to none in the 45th Women's Ōshō title match. The victory was Nishiyama's seventh major title since officially becoming a women's professional in April 2021 and thus qualified her for promotion to the rank of women's professional 5-dan. (Note: Nishiyama won seven women's major titles while still a member of the professional shogi apprentice school before officially becoming a women's professional in April 2021.) A few weeks later, Nishiyama returned to 4-crown status by defeating Satomi 4 games to 3 in 3rd Hakurei title match (September–October 2023). Nishiyama faced Satomi in a major title match for the third time in 2023 as challenger for the 31st Kurashiki Tōka Cup (November 2023), but lost the match 2 games to none.

In January–February 2024, Nishiyama defended her Women's Meijin title against Kana Fukuma (née Satomi) in the 50th Women't Meijin Match, but lost the match 3 games to 1.

In May 2024, Nishiyama won the Women's Mynabi Open Jo-Ō title for the seventh consecutive year when she defeated Ayaka Ōshima 3 games to 0 in the 17th Women's Mynavi Open (April –May 2024) title match.

In September–October 2024, Nishiyama successfully defended her Hakurei and Women's Ōshō titles. Both matches were against Women's 5-crown Fukuma, who forfeited several games due to not feeling well due to her pregnancy. Nishiyama was trailing the 4th Hakurei title match (September–October 2024) 2 games to 1 before Game 4 was postponed because Nishiyama had contracted COVID-19. Nishiyama won the rescheduled Game 4 to draw even at two wins apiece before Fukuma forfeited Games 5 and 6 to lose the match 4 games to 2. In the 46th Women's Ōshō title match (October 2024), Nishiyama lost Game 1, but Fukuma forfeited Games 2 and 3 to lose the match 2 games to 1. Nishiyama's defense of her Women's Ōshō title was her fifth Women's Ōshō overall and qualified her for the Queen Ōshō title.

Nishiyama faced Fukuma yet again in the 14th Women's Ōza title match (October 2024 and February–March 2025). Game 1 of the match was played in October 2024, and was won by Fukuma. Games 2 and 3, however, were postponed because Fukuma was scheduled to take an official leave of absence due to being pregnant, and the match was scheduled to restart in February 2025. Upon the resumption of the match, Fukuma won Games 2 and 3 to defend her Women's Ōza title 3 games to none.

Nishiyama lost her Women's Mynabi Open Jo-Ō title and dropped to 2-crown status after losing 18th Women's Mynavi Open (April–June 2025) 3 games to 2 to Fukuma. In September–October 2025, however, she successfully defended her two remaining titles to maintain her 2-crown status; first, she defeated Fukuma 4 games to 2 to win the 5th Hakurei title match (September–October 2025), and then she defeated Nanami Naka 2 games to 1 to win the 47th Women's Ōshō title match (October 2025). Nishiyama's victory over Fukuma not only gave her the first prize money totaling JPY 50,000,000 but also moved her within in one Hakurei title of becoming the first female to qualify for regular professional 4-dan status, and her victory over Naka moved her into sole possession of third place with respect to the all-time number of women's professional major titles won behind Fukuma (65) and Ichiyo Shimizu (43). A week earlier that same month Nishiyama and Fukuma faced each other yet again in a major title match when they met in the 15th Women's Ōza Title Match (October–November 2025); Nishiyama's challenge was unsuccessful though as Fukuma defended her Women's Ōza title by winning the match 3 games to none.

Nishiyama returned to 3-crown title holder status after recapturing the Women's Meijin title in February 2026 by defeating Women's Meijin Fukuma 3 games to none in the 52nd Women's Meijin title match (January–February 2026). Nishiyama next challenged Fukuma 19th Mynavi Women's Open Title Match (April–May 2026), attempting to recapture the Jo-Ō title she lost to Fukuma the year before. After three games, Nishiyma was leading the match 2 games to 1 and was one win away from not only recapturing the Jo-Ō title but also regaining 4-crown status; Fukuma, however, was able to win the next two game to defend her title.

Nishiyama won the Seirei title for the first time and returned to 4-crown status in August 2026 by defeating Fukuma 3 games to 1 in the 8th Seirei Title Match (July–August 2026).

In October 2026, Nishiyama successfully defended her Hakurei title when she defeated Fukuma 4 games to 1 to win the 6th Hakurei Title Match (August–October 2026). It was the fifth time she won the title and qualified her to become the first women's professional to obtain the "Queen Hakurei" title. Eleven days after defending her Hakurei title, Nishiyama defeated Naka 2 games to 1 in the 48th Women's Ōshō title match (October 2026) to retain her Women's Ōshō title.

=== Women's professional promotion history ===
Nishiyama's promotion history as a women's professional is as follows.

- 3-dan: April 1, 2021
- 4-dan: June 13, 2022
- 5-dan: October 17, 2023
- Note: Ranks are women's professional ranks.

=== Titles and other championships ===
Nishiyama has appeared in women's professional shogi major title matches a total of 38 times and has won 24 titles.

==== Major titles ====
Title	Years	Number of times overall
Jo-Ō	2018–24	7
Women's Ōshō	2019–20, 2022–26 (current)	7
Women's Ōza	2019–20	2
Hakurei	2021, 2023–26 (current)	5
Women's Meijin	2022, 2025 (current)	2
Seirei	2026 (current)	1

=== Awards and honors ===
Nishiyamai has received a number of Japan Shogi Association Annual Shogi Awards.

==== Annual Shogi Awards ====
- 47th Annual Awards (April 2019 – March 2020): Women's Professional Game of the Year
- 48th Annual Awards (April 2020 – March 2021): Women's Professional Game of the Year
- 49th Annual Awards (April 2021 – March 2022): Excellent Women's Professional
- 50th Annual Awards (April 2022 – March 2023): Excellent Women's Professional and Women's Professional Most Games Played
- 51st Annual Awards (April 2023 – March 2024): Excellent Women's Professional and Women's Professional Game of the Year
- 52nd Annual Awards (April 2024 – March 2025): Excellent Women's Professional and Women's Professional Game of the Year

=== Professional Admission Test ===
On August 9, 2024, the JSA announced that it had approved Nishiyama's application for the Professional Admission Test, making her the second woman to be approved for the test. (Note: The first was Kana Fukuma, who took the test in August–October 2022.) She satisfied the criteria for the test the previous month when she defeated a regular professional in the official tournament play to improve her recent record against regular professionals to 13 wins and 7 losses for a winning percentage of 65%. Nishiyama's test consisted of a best-of-five test match against the five most recently promoted regular professionals (Yūjirō Takahashi, Taiki Yamakawa, Hirotoshi Ueno, Kenta Miyajima and Kanta Masegi with her needing to win three of the five games to be awarded regular professional status as a "Free Class" professional. The schedule was for one game to be played a month starting in September 2024 under official game conditions.

Nishiyama's first game of her test against Takahashi was held on September 10; she won the game in 132 moves to move one step closer to becoming the first woman to be awarded regular professional status by the JSA. Game 2 of the test against Yamakawa was played on October 2, 2024, with Yamakawa winning in 104 moves. Five days before the game on September 27, 2024, the JSA posted on its official website that Nishiyama had been diagnosed with COVID-19, and that Game 4 of her 4th Hakurei Title Match scheduled to be held the following day (September 28, 2024) against challenger Fukuma was being postponed as a result. After her Game 2 loss to Yamakawa, Nishiyama stated she was "sorry for any inconvenience she caused due to her inability to take better care of health" and that she "would try to show her true playing strength in Game 3". Nishiyama faced Ueno in Game 3 on November 8, 2024, but lost the game in 109 moves, which left her needing to win her next two games to pass the test. Game 4 against Miyajima was played on December 17, 2024, at the JSA's new Kansai Branch Office; Nishiyama won the game in 95 moves which meant the result of her test would be decided in Game 5 scheduled to be held in January 2025. Game 5 against Masegi was played on January 22, 2025, at the Kansai Brach office; Nishiyama lost which meant she failed the test. At a post-game press conference, Nishiyama stated that the test was a good experience that she gained a lot from even though she failed, and that she was happy it brought more attention to Women's professional shogi.

== Regular shogi professional ==
On October 10, 2026, Nishiyama won the Hakurei title for the fifth time and qualified her to become professional shogi's first female regular shogi professional because the JSA agreed at its June 2025 general meeting to give five-time winners of the Hakurei Title the option of becoming a "regular shogi professional" as long as they declare their intention to do so within two weeks. At a press conference held at the JSA's headquarters on October 26, 2026, Nishiyama announced her intention to become a regular professional. Nishiyama will be officially awarded regular professional status on April 1, 2027, as a Free Class player. Nishiyama's regular professional status will not affect her ability to participate in women's professional shogi tournaments, but she will need to qualify for promotion from Free Class status within ten years of officially becoming a regular professional to avoid mandatory retirement as a regular professional.

== Personal life ==
Nishiyama's older sister Shizuka is a Go professional.

At the end of November 2025, the JSA posted on its official website that Nishiyama had gotten married and would continue to complete under her maiden name.
