= Women's Meijin (shogi) =

Women's professional shogi tournament

- Native name: 女流名人戦
- Type: Women's title
- Official name: Universal Cup Women's Meijin Tournament
- Sponsor(s): Sports Hochi; Universal Entertainment
- Former name(s): Okada Museum of Art Cup Women's Meijin Tournament (2015–2024); Universal Cup Women's Meijin Tournament (2009–2014); Aruze Cup Women's Meijin Tournament (2002–2008); Women's Professional Meijin Tournament (2000–2001)
- Winner's title: Women's Meijin
- Reigning champion: Tomoka Nishiyama
- Number of times held: 52
- First held: 1974
- Last held: 2025
- Lifetime champions: Queen Meijin title holders: Hiroe Nakai (1992); Ichiyo Shimizu (1996); Kana Satomi (2013)
- Most times won: Kana Fukuma (14 times)
- Most consecutive wins: Kana Fukuma (12 times, 2009–2020)

Website(s)
- JSA tournament website (in Japanese)
- Sponsor's tournament website (in Japanese)

The Women's Meijin (女流名人 (Joryū Meijin)) is one of the eight major titles of women's professional shogi. The title is awarded yearly to the winner of the a best-of-five match between the defending Women's Meijin and a challenger determined through league play. The current Women's Meijin titleholder is Tomoka Nishiyama.

Founded in 1974, the Women's Meijin is the oldest of the women's major titles. The title match and league play is currently cosponsored by the Japanese daily sports newspaper Sports Hochi with additional support being provided by the Japanese company Universal Entertainment. The tournament is officially known as the Universal Cup Women's Meijin Tournament (ユニバーサル杯女流名人戦 (Yunibāsaru Joryū Meijinsen)).

== History ==
Up until 1974, there had no been system specifically for women players within the Japan Shogi Association (JSA) and they were expected to meet the same promotion and ranking rules as men if they wanted to obtain full professional status (正棋士 (Seikishi)) as a shogi player. In 1974, Yasuharu Ōyama, the then-president of the JSA, expressed his desire to try and increase the popularity of shogi among women, and began to discuss the establishment of a separate system within the JSA for women shogi players. At the same, time the establishment of a new tournament solely for such women was also being discussed and the Hochi Shimbun Corporation was approached in September 1974 over the possibility of becoming this new tournament's sponsor. The Hochi Shimbun agreed to sponsor the tournament and it was officially established in October 1974 as the Women's Professional Meijin Tournament (女流プロ名人位戦 (Joryū Puro Meijin-i-sen)).

The first tournament consisted of the original six women to be awarded women's professional status by the JSA in 1974: Akiko Takojima, Yoshiko Tada, Taeko Moriyasu, Kazuko Yamashita, Kiyoko Sekine and Yukiko Murayama. Takojima was seeded into the final match in consideration of her previous accomplishments as an apprentice professional with the remaining five women playing a tournament to determine which one would advance to the final match. Terashita won the tournament, but lost to Takojima 2 games to none in the best-of-three final match; thus Takojima was the first person to be award the title of "Women's Meijin".

Starting with the 2nd Women's Professional Meijin Tournament, the defending Women's Meijin was automatically seeded into the title match, and the challenger was determined through league play. The title match remained a best-of-three series until 1980 when it changed to a best-of-five series.

From the 29th Meijin (2002–3) until the 35th Meijin (2008–9), the tournament was officially known as the "Aruze Cup Women's Meijin Tournament" (アルゼ杯女流名人位戦 (Aruze Hai Joryū Meijin-i-sen)) after the former name of the Universal Entertainment Corporation. The tournament's name changed to the "Universal Cup Women's Meijin Tournament" (ユニバーサル杯女流名人位戦 (Yunibāsaru Hai Joryū Meijin-i-sen)) from the 36th Women's Meijin Tournament (2009–10) until the 42nd Meijin Tournament (2014–15) to reflect name change of Aruze to Universal. It adopted the name "Okada Museum of Art Cup Women's Meijin Tournament" (岡田美術館杯女流名人戦 (Okada Bijutsukanhai Joryū Meijinsen)) after the Okada Museum of Art, which is affiliated with Universal Entertainment, in March 2015. The official name of the tournament changed again in March 2025, once again becoming the "Universal Cup Women's Meijin Tournament" (ユニバーサル杯女流名人戦 (Yunibāsaru Hai Joryū Meijin-sen)) starting with the 52nd Women's Meijin Tournament. (Note: The current Japanese name ユニバーサル杯女流名人戦 (Yunibāsaru Hai Joryū Meijin-sen) is different than the previous ユニバーサル杯女流名人位戦 (Yunibāsaru Hai Joryū Meijin-i-sen), but both can roughly be translated the same way into English.)

The kanji character 位 (i (Japanese pronunciation: [i]); which means "rank", but which also can mean "about" in some contexts) was originally part of the tournament's official Japanese name when it was established in 1974. This was done primarily out of deference to the regular professional shogi players who competed for the Meijin title so as to acknowledge its higher status. In March 2014, however, the Japan Shogi Association announced that character was being officially dropped from the tournaments name to not only commemorate the 40th anniversary of the establishment of the women's professional system and the Women's Meijin tournament, but also to recognize the strides women's professional shogi made since 1974.

== Format ==
The tournament consists of three parts: a preliminary round, a challengers league and a title match. Tournament play begins in April to coincide with the beginning of the new shogi season (Note: The professional shogi season is from April 1 until March 31 and coincides with the fiscal and administrative year of the Japan Shogi Association and most other Japanese organizations.) with the title match taking place in January and February of the following calendar year.

All active women's professional shogi players (including LPSA and unaffiliated women's professionals) are eligible to participate in the preliminary round, which consists of four single-elimination tournaments in which the winner of each tournament advances to the challengers league. The time control for preliminary round games is two hours per player.

The challengers league consists of ten players who are seeded based upon their performance in the previous years' tournament. It is a round-robin tournament with a time control of two hours per game with the winner advancing to the title match against the defending Women's Meijin. If two of more players tie for first place, a playoff is held with the format depending upon the number of players involved. (Note: An example of this occurred in the 41st Women's Meijin in 2014–2015 when Ichiyo Shimizu and Manao Kagawa each finished league play with a record of 6 wins and 3 losses. A one-game-playoff was held to determine who would advance to the title match, and this playoff was won by Shimizu.) Players finishing second through fifth place remain in the league and are re-seeded for the following year, while the bottom four finishers are relegated from the league and need to re-qualify via the preliminary tournaments. In cases where relegation is unclear due to ties, a playoff is held to determine which player remains in the challengers league. (Note: An example of this occurred in the 42nd Women's Meijin in 2015–2016 when Manaka Inagawa and Yuki Muroya each finished league play with a record of 4 wins and 5 losses. A one-game-playoff was held to determine who would be relegated from league play. Muraya won the playoff to remain in the league.)

The title match is a best-of-five format between the defending Women's Meijin and the winner of the challengers league with the time control for each game being three hours per player. The winner is awarded the title of "Women's Meijin", while the loser becomes the first seed in the challenger league for the next tournament cycle.

== Queen Meijin ==
The lifetime title of "Queen Meijin" is awarded to those players who have won the title five times or more. The title is officially awarded once the player has retired from active play. As of November 2020, three players have qualified for the title: Hiroe Nakai (1992), Ichiyo Shimizu (1996) and Kana Satomi (2013).

== Winners ==
Below is a list of Women Meijin title holders. From 1974 until 1980, the title match was a best-of-three series. The number in parentheses represents the total times a player has won the title.

No.	Year	Winner	Score	Opponent
1	1974	Akiko Takojima	2–0	Noriko Terashita
2	1975	Akiko Takojima (2)	2–0	Yoshiko Tada
3	1976	Akiko Takojima (3)	2–0	Taeko Moriyasu
4	1977	Kazuko Yamashita	2–0	Akiko Takojima
5	1978	Kazuko Yamashita (2)	2–0	Kiyoko Sekine
6	1979	Kazuko Yamashita (3)	2–0	Kiyoko Sekine
7	1980	Kazuko Yamashita (4)	2–0	Akiko Takojima
8	1981	Akiko Takojima (4)	3–1	Kazuko Yamashita
9	1982	Naoko Hayashiba	3–1	Akiko Takojima
10	1983	Naoko Hayashiba (2)	3–0	Kiyoko Sekine
11	1984	Naoko Hayashiba (3)	3–1	Chikako Nagasawa
12	1985	Hiroe Nakai	3–1	Naoko Hayashiba
13	1986	Hiroe Nakai (2)	3–2	Naoko Hayashiba
14	1987	Ichiyo Shimizu	3–0	Hiroe Nakai
15	1988	Hiroe Nakai (3)	3–2	Ichiyo Shimizu
16	1989	Ichiyo Shimizu (2)	3–0	Hiroe Nakai
17	1990	Naoko Hayashiba (4)	3–0	Ichiyo Shimizu
18	1991	Hiroe Nakai (4)	3–2	Naoko Hayashiba
19	1992	Hiroe Nakai (5)	3–0	Ichiyo Shimizu
20	1993	Hiroe Nakai (6)	3–2	Haruko Saida
21	1994	Ichiyo Shimizu (3)	3–0	Hiroe Nakai
22	1995	Ichiyo Shimizu (4)	3–0	Hiroe Nakai
23	1996	Ichiyo Shimizu (5)	3–2	Hiroe Nakai
24	1997	Ichiyo Shimizu (6)	3–0	Hiroe Nakai
25	1998	Ichiyo Shimizu (7)	3–1	Ryōko Usui
26	1999	Hiroe Nakai (7)	3–0	Ichiyo Shimizu
27	2000	Haruko Saida	3–2	Hiroe Nakai
28	2001	Hiroe Nakai (8)	3–0	Haruko Saida
29	2002	Hiroe Nakai (9)	3–2	Ryōko Usui
30	2003	Ichiyo Shimizu (8)	3–1	Hiroe Nakai
31	2004	Ichiyo Shimizu (9)	3–1	Ryōko Chiba
32	2005	Rieko Yauchi	3–0	Ichiyo Shimizu
33	2006	Rieko Yauchi (2)	3–2	Hiroe Nakai
34	2007	Rieko Yauchi (3)	3–0	Haruko Saida
35	2008	Ichiyo Shimizu (10)	3–2	Reiko Yauchi
36	2009	Kana Satomi	3–0	Ichiyo Shimizu
37	2010	Kana Satomi (2)	3–0	Ichiyo Shimizu
38	2011	Kana Satomi (3)	3–1	Ichiyo Shimizu
39	2012	Kana Satomi (4)	3–2	Hatsumi Ueda
40	2013	Kana Satomi (5)	3–0	Marika Nakamura
41	2014	Kana Satomi (6)	3–0	Ichiyo Shimizu
42	2015	Kana Satomi (7)	3–2	Ichiyo Shimizu
43	2016	Kana Satomi (8)	3–2	Hatsumi Ueda
44	2017	Kana Satomi (9)	3–0	Sae Itō
45	2018	Kana Satomi (10)	3–1	Sae Itō
46	2019	Kana Satomi (11)	3–0	Yuki Taniguchi
47	2020	Kana Satomi (12)	3–0	Momoko Katō
48	2021	Sae Itō	3–1	Kana Satomi
49	2022	Tomoka Nishiyama	3–1	Sae Itō
50	2023	Kana Fukuma (née Sakuma) (13) (Note: This was the thirteenth Women's Meijin title overall for Fukuma but the first since getting married.)	3–1	Tomoka Nishiyama
51	2024	Kana Fukuma (14)	3–2	Tomoka Nishiyama
52	2025	Tomoka Nishiyama (2)	3–0	Kana Fukuma

== Records ==
- Most Women's Meijin titles: Satomi Kana (13)
- Most consecutive Women's Meijin titles: Satomi Kana (12)
- Most appearances in Women's Meijin title match: Ichiyo Shimizu (20)

== Meijin League ==
The challenger for the Meijin title is determined through a 10-player league system in which the winner of the league advances to the title match against the reigning Meijin. Players are seeded based upon their results in the previous year's league, with the top seed being the loser of the previous year's title match. The four lowest finishers in league play each year are demoted from the league and must requalify through single-elimination preliminary tournaments. The remaining five players are re-seeded from two to six based upon their results from the previous year, and the four winners of the preliminary tournaments are seeded as a joint number seven seed. Ties between players to determine the league's winner and which players are demoted are resolved through playoff games.

The players of the 52nd Women's Meijin League (April – December 2025) are as follows.

52nd Meijin League
Seed	Name (Note: Players marked with an asterisk (*) are members of the Ladies Professional Shogi-players' Association of Japan and players marked with a cross (†) are unaffiliated women's professional players. All others are member of the Japan Shogi Association.)	Dan (Note: All dan ranks are women's professional ranks.)
1	Tomoka Nishiyama	5
2	Aya Uchiyama	1
3	Sakura Ishimoto	3
4	Mana Watanabe*	3
4	Aya Imai	1
6	Ayaka Ōshima	2
7	Hiroe Nakai†	6
7	Sae Itō	4
7	Miran Nohara	2
7	Saki Miyazawa	1
