= Muroya =

Muroya (written: 室屋) is a Japanese surname. Notable people with the surname include:

- Sei Muroya (室屋 成, born 1995), Japanese footballer
- Yoshihide Muroya (室屋 義秀, born 1973), Japanese aviator
- Yoshitaka Muroya (室矢 芳隆, born 1930), Japanese middle-distance runner
- Yuki Muroya (室谷 由紀, born 1993), better known as Yuki Taniguchi, Japanese shogi player
