= Ryōko Chiba =

Japanese shogi player (born 1980)

- Native name: 千葉 涼子
- Maiden name: Usui (碓井)
- Born: April 21, 1980 (age 45)
- Hometown: Toyama Prefecture

Career
- Achieved professional status: October 1, 1994 (aged 14)
- Badge Number: W-17
- Rank: Women's 5-dan
- Teacher: Noboru Sakurai (8-dan)
- Major titles won: 2
- Tournaments won: 1

Websites
- JSA profile page

Ryōko Chiba (千葉 涼子 Chiba Ryōko, née 涼子碓井 Ryōko Usui, born April 21, 1980) is a Japanese women's professional shogi player ranked 5-dan. She is a two-time winner of the Women's Ōshō title.

== Women's shogi professional ==
Chiba's (then known as Ryōko Usui) first appearance in a women's professional shogi major title match came in 1998 when she challenged Ichiyo Shimizu for the 6th Kurashiki Tōka Cup; Chiba lost the match 2 games to 1. That same year Chiba also challenged Shimizu for the 25th Women's Meijin title, but once again lost (3 games to 1).

In 1999 and 2000, Chiba yet again challenged Shimizu in a major title matches. She lost the 10th and 11th Women's Ōi title matches respectively by the scores of 3 games to 1 and 3 games to none. Later in 2000, Chiba won her first tournament as a women's professional when she defeated Hiroe Nakai 3 games to 1 to win the 5th Kajima Cup. Chiba and Nakai met once again the following year in the finals of the 6th Kajima Cup Tournament, but this time Nakai won 3 games to 1.

In 2002, Chiba challenged Nakai for the 29th Women's Meijin title and was leading the match 2 games to 1 after three games. Chiba was, however, unable to pick up the third win she needed to capture the title, and Nakai came back to win the match 3 games to 2. Chiba once again challenged for the Women's Meijin title in 2004, but lost the 31st Women's Meijin match to Shimizu 3 games to 1.

Chiba finally won her first women's professional shogi major title in June 2005 when she defeated Nakai 3 games to none to win the 27th Women's Ōshō title. The following year, Nakai once again challenged Chiba in the 28th Women's Ōshō title match, but this time it was Chiba coming back to win Games 4 and 5 to successfully defend her title 3 games to 2. Chiba defended her Women's Ōshō against Shimizu in 2007 and started well by winning Game 1, but Shimizu won the next three games to capture the 29th Women's Ōshō match 3 games to 1.

=== Promotion history ===
Chiba has been promoted as follows.

- Women's Professional Apprentice League: 1994
- 2-kyū: October 1, 1994
- 1-kyū: April 1, 1996
- 1-dan: October 21, 1996
- 2-dan: October 16, 1998
- 3-dan: April 25, 2002
- 4-dan: April 21, 2011
- 5-dan: February 20, 2026

Note: All ranks are women's professional ranks.

=== Titles and other championships ===
Chiba has appeared in major title matches nine times and has won a total of two titles. In addition to major titles, Chiba has won one other shogi championship.

==== Major titles ====
Title	Years	Number of times overall
Women's Ōshō	2005–06	2

==== Other championships ====
Tournament	Years	Number of times
^{*}Kajima Cup	2000	1

Note: Tournaments marked with an asterisk (*) are no longer held or currently suspended.

=== Awards and honors ===
Chiba received the Japan Shogi Association's "Women's Professional" Annual Shogi Award for the April 2005 – March 2006 shogi year.

== Personal life ==
Chiba's husband, Sakio Chiba is also a shogi professional. The couple married in May 2003, and have two daughters.
