= NHK Cup =

NHK Cup is a tournament in which the Japan Broadcasting Corporation (NHK) presents the winner's cup.

- NHK Cup (Go), Japanese professional Go tournament
- NHK Cup (shogi), Japanese professional shogi tournament
- NHK Mile Cup, Japanese horse race
- NHK Trophy, figure skating competition
- NHK Cup New Year's Day Soccer(ja:NHK杯元日サッカー), football competition, formerly NHK Cup played in the 1967 season
