= Chikako Nagasawa =

Japanese shogi player (born 1964)

- Native name: 長沢千和子
- Born: June 18, 1964 (age 61)
- Hometown: Matsumoto, Nagano

Career
- Achieved professional status: August 1, 1979 (aged 15)
- Badge Number: W-5
- Rank: Women's 5-dan
- Teacher: Shigeyuki Matsuda (8-dan)
- Tournaments won: 1

Websites
- JSA profile page

Chikako Nagasawa (長沢 千和子, Nagasawa Chikako; born June 18, 1964) is a Japanese women's professional shogi player ranked 5-dan.

== Women's shogi professional ==
=== Promotion history ===
Nagasawa's promotion history is as follows.

- 2-kyū: August 1, 1979
- 1-dan: February 26, 1980
- 2-dan: April 7, 1994
- 3-dan: May 22, 1989
- 4-dan: April 1, 2000
- 5-dan: November 11, 2024

Note: All ranks are women's professional ranks.

=== Titles and other championships ===
Nagasawa has appeared in women's major title matches twice, but has yet to win a major title. She was the challenger for the 6th Women's Ōshō title in 1983 and the 11th Women's Meijin title in 1984, but lost each time. She has, however, won one non-major title women's tournament: the 9th Ladies Open Tournament in 1995.

=== Awards and honors ===
Nagasawa received the Japan Shogi Association's received the "25 Years Service Award" in recognition of being an active professional for twenty-five years in 2004.
