= Saki Kawamata =

Japanese shogi player (born 1996)

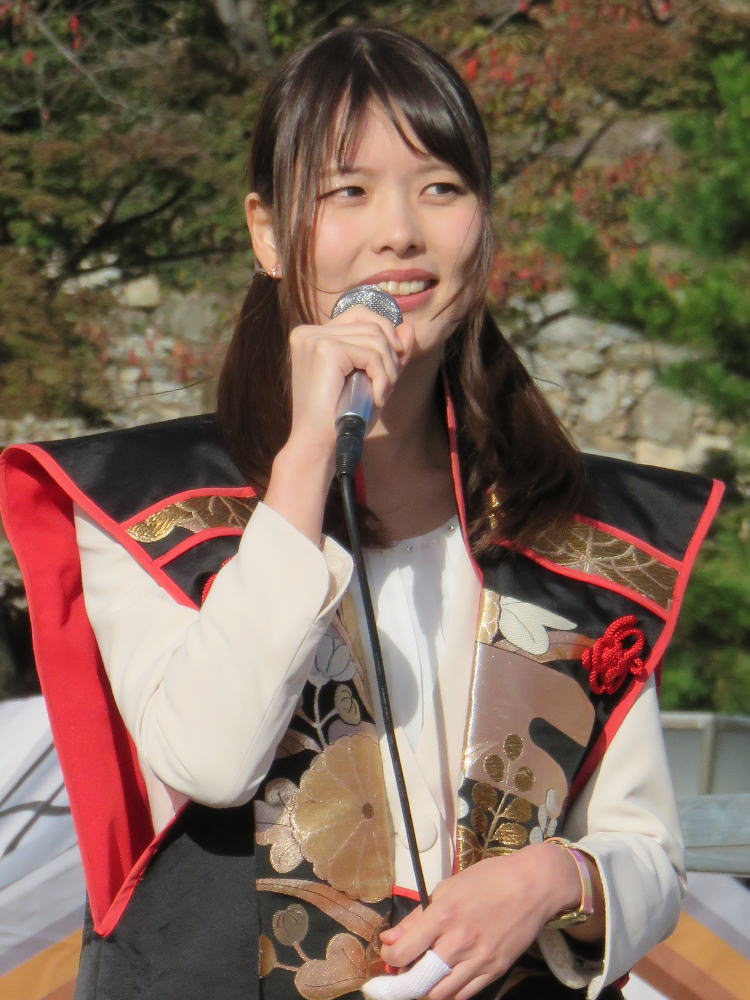
- Kawamata at a human shogi event in November 2017
- Native name: 川又咲紀
- Maiden name: Satomi (里見)
- Born: April 28, 1996 (age 29)
- Hometown: Izumo, Shimane

Career
- Achieved professional status: April 27, 2016 (aged 19)
- Badge Number: W-56
- Rank: Women's 2-dan
- Teacher: Keiji Mori (9-dan)
- Tournaments won: 1

Websites
- JSA profile page

Saki Kawamata (川又 咲紀, Kawamata Saki; (née Satomi (里見)) born April 28, 1996) is a Japanese women's professional shogi player ranked 2-dan. Her older sister Kana is also a women's professional shogi player.

== Early life ==
Kawamata (née Satomi (里見)) was born on April 28, 1996, in Izumo, Shimane. She became interested in because her older brother and older sister both played the game.

In August 2011 when she was a third-grade junior high school student, Satomi finished third in the 3rd Junior High School Student Girl's Meijin Tournament. The following year, she was accepted into Japan Shogi Association (JSA) Kansai Branch's training group system. She was awarded the provisional women's professional rank of 3-kyū in February 2016 under the sponsorship of shogi professional Keiji Mori, and obtained the rank of women's professional 2-kyū and full women's professional status two months later in April 2016.

== Women's shogi professional ==
=== Promotion history ===
Kawamata's promotion history is as follows:

- 3-kyū: February 22, 2016
- 2-kyū: April 27, 2016
- 1-kyū: July 4, 2016
- 1-dan: April 1, 2017
- 2-dan: October 28, 2025

Note: All ranks are women's professional ranks.

== Personal life ==
Kawamata and her sister Kana are the third pair of sisters to be awarded women's professional shogi status by the JSA.

At the end of March 2022, the Japan Shogi Association announced that Kawamata had gotten married and would be no longer competing under her maiden name "Satomi".
