= Yūjirō Takahashi =

Japanese shogi player

- Native name: 高橋佑二郎
- Born: July 9, 1999 (age 27)
- Hometown: Funabashi,Chiba Prefecture, Japan

Career
- Achieved professional status: October 1, 2024 (aged 25)
- Badge number: 342
- Rank: 4-dan
- Teacher: Jun'ichi Kase (7-dan)
- Tournaments won: 1
- Meijin class: C2
- Ryūō class: 6

Websites
- JSA profile page

Yūjirō Takahashi (高橋 佑二郎, Takahashi Yūjirō; July 9, 1999) is a Japanese professional shogi player ranked 4-dan.

== Early life and amateur shogi ==
Takahashi was born in Funabashi, Chiba Prefecture, on July 9, 1999. Takahashi became interested in shogi after seeing is father and older brother playing the game. In September 2011, he entered the Japan Shogi Association's apprentice school at the rank of 6-kyū under the sponsorship of shogi professional Jun'ichi Kase. He was promoted to the rank of apprentice professional 3-dan in September 2020, and obtained regular professional status and the rank of 4-dan in April 2024 after finishing second in the 74th 3-dan League (October 2023 – March 2024) with a record of 14 wins and 4 losses. Takahashi became the first person from Funabashi in 39 years to become a professional shogi player and just the second overall. (Note: Kazuharu Shoshi, who was born in Tokyo but raised in Funabashi, became the first in 1985.)

== Shogi professional ==
Takahashi's debut as a professional began with two consecutive wins in the 1st preliminary round of the 96th Kisei tournament on May 21, 2024: first he defeated Hideyuki Takano in the morning session and then he defeated Kei Honda in the afternoon session. His winning streak, however, ended at two when he lost to apprentice professional 3-dan Naoki Koreeda in the first round of 14th Kakogawa Seiryū Tournament on June 8, 2024; the pair actually played two games: the first one ended in impasse and Takahashi lost the replay game in 130 moves.

In September 2024, Takahashi was chosen to be the opponent for women's shogi professional Tomoka Nishiyama in Game One of her Professional Admission Test; he lost the game in 132 moves.

=== Promotion history ===
The promotion history for Takahashi is as follows.

- 6-kyū: September 2011
- 3-dan: September 2020
- 4-dan: October 1, 2024
