= Hirofumi Itō =

Japanese shogi player

- Native name: 伊藤博文
- Born: February 8, 1960 (age 65)
- Hometown: Yamatotakada, Nara
- Nationality: Japanese

Career
- Achieved professional status: August 1, 1984 (aged 24)
- Badge Number: 166
- Rank: 7-dan
- Retired: May 26, 2020 (aged 60)
- Teacher: Yasuo Date (8-dan)
- Notable students: Tomoka Nishiyama; Nana Fujii

Websites
- JSA profile page

Hirofumi Itō (伊藤 博文, Itō Hirofumi; February 8, 1960) is a Japanese retired professional shogi player who achieved the rank of 7-dan.

== Shogi professional ==
On June 8, 2020, the Japan Shogi Association announced on its website that Itō had retired from professional shogi. His official retirement date was given as May 26, 2020.

=== Promotion history ===
The promotion history for Itō was as follows:

- 6-kyū: 1974
- 1-dan: 1978
- 4-dan: April 1, 1974
- 5-dan: April 8, 1991
- 6-dan: April 1, 2002
- 7-dan: April 1, 2017
- Retired: May 26, 2020

=== Awards and honors ===
In 2009, Itō received the Japan Shogi Association's "25 Years Service Award" for being an active professional for twenty-five years.
