= Sakio Chiba =

Japanese shogi player

- Native name: 千葉幸生
- Born: February 11, 1979 (age 46)
- Hometown: Machida, Tokyo

Career
- Achieved professional status: October 1, 2000 (aged 21)
- Badge Number: 237
- Rank: 7 dan
- Teacher: Shigeru Sekine (9-dan)
- Meijin class: C2
- Ryūō class: 5

Websites
- JSA profile page

Sakio Chiba (千葉 幸生, Chiba Sakio; born February 11, 1979) is a Japanese professional shogi player ranked 7-dan. He is also an executive director of the Japan Shogi Association.

== Early life and apprenticeship ==
Chiba was born on February 11, 1979, in Machida, Tokyo. He entered the Japan Shogi Association's apprentice school when he was a junior high school ninth-grade student in 1993 under the guidance of shogi professional Shigeru Sekine at the rank of 6-kyū. He was promoted to 1-dan in 1995 and obtained full professional status and the rank of 4-dan in October 2000 after winning the 27th 3-dan league (April 2000 – September 2000).

== Shogi professional ==
=== Promotion history ===
Chiba's promotion history is as follows:

- 6-kyū: 1993
- 1-dan: 1995
- 4-dan: October 1, 2000
- 5-dan: April 1, 2004
- 6-dan: September 16, 2010
- 7-dan: February 6, 2018

== JSA director ==
Chiba was elected an executive director of the JSA at its 76th General Meeting in June 2025.

== Personal life ==
Chiba's wife, Ryōko is a female shogi professional. The couple married in May 2003, and have two daughters.
