= Hiroe Nakai =

Japanese professional shogi player (born 1969)

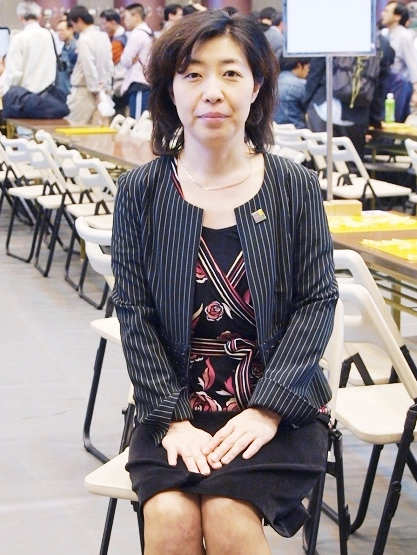
- Nakai in 2009
- Native name: 中井広恵
- Born: June 24, 1969 (age 56)
- Hometown: Wakkanai, Hokkaido

Career
- Achieved professional status: April 1, 1981 (aged 11)
- Badge Number: JSA W-7; LPSA W-7
- Rank: Women's 6-dan
- Teacher: Yūji Sase (9-dan)
- Lifetime titles: Queen Meijin
- Major titles won: 19
- Tournaments won: 12

Websites
- Hiroe Nakai on Twitter

Hiroe Nakai (中井 広恵, Nakai Hiroe) (born June 24, 1969, in Wakkanai, Hokkaido) is a Japanese women's professional shogi player ranked 6-dan. She is a former women's shogi professional major title holder, having won 19 major titles throughout her career, and has been awarded the lifetime title of Queen Meijin, and also was the first women's professional to beat a regular shogi professional in an official game, the first women's professional to win an official game against a Class A professional, and the first women's professional to win a game in the NHK Cup TV Shogi Tournament.

Nakai also is a former representative director of the Ladies Professional Shogi-player's Association of Japan (LPSA).

== Early life ==
Nakai started playing shogi at the age of 4. She finished second in the Elementary Student Meijin Tournament in 1981 at the age of 11. In 1983, she entered the Japan Shogi Association's apprentice school and reached the rank of 2-kyū before deciding to leave in 1990.

== Women's shogi professional ==
Nakai was awarded the rank of women's professional 2-kyū by the Japan Shogi Association in April 1981 at the age of 11 as a protegee of Yūji Satō.

In 1993, Nakai became the first women's professional to defeat a regular professional in an official game when she beat Shūichi Ikeda in a Ryūō tournament game.

Nakai was 16 years old when she won her first major title in 1985 by defeating the reigning Women's Meijin Naoko Hayashiba three games to one to win the Women's Meijin title. The following year the roles were reversed with Nakai successfully defending her title against the challenger Kobayashi three games to two.

In 2003, Nakai became the first women's professional to win a NHK Cup TV Shogi Tournament game. She won her round 1 game of the 53rd NHK Cup (2003) against Mamoru Hatakeyama and then in round 2 won against Teruichi Aono (who was in Class A at the time). She lost in round 3 to Makoto Nakahara. The following year Nakai also qualified for the 54th NHK Cup (2004) and beat Shūji Satō in round 1. In round 2, Nakai faced Yasumitsu Satō who was the reigning Kisei title holder. Nakai obtained an advantageous position against Satō, but was unable to convert it into a win. Nakai is still the only women's professional to have won a NHK Cup game.

In April 2009, Nakai became the first women's professional to win 500 official games, and then became the first women's professional to win 600 official games in January 2015.

In August 2010, Nakai defeated Sayuri Honda in the quarterfinals of the Kurashiki Tōka Cup to win her nineteenth official game in a row and set a new record for consecutive wins by a women's professional.

In October 2020, Nakai at 51 years and 3 months old became the oldest challenger for a women's major title when she defeated Sakura Ishimoto in the finals of the challenger tournament for the 28th Kurashiki Tōka Cup. The win advanced Nakai to a women's major title match for the first time in 16 years and it also broke the previous record for oldest title challenger of 49 years and 8 months set two years earlier by Ichiyo Shimizu. Nakai's challenge, however, was unsuccessful as she lost the 48th Kurashiki Tōka Cup title match against Kana Satomi 2 games to none.

=== Promotion history ===
Nakai has been promoted as follows.

- 2-kyū: April 1, 1981
- 1-dan: March 10, 1983
- 2-dan: April 1, 1983
- 3-dan: April 1, 1986
- 4-dan: April 1, 1989
- 5-dan: April 1, 1992
- 6-dan: November 25, 2002

Note: All ranks are women's professional ranks.

=== Titles and other championships ===
Nakai has appeared in major title matches a total of 44 times and has won a total of 19 titles. She has won the Women's Meijin title nine times and has been awarded the title of Queen Meijin. She has also won the Women's Ōshō title four times, the Women's Ōi title three times and the Kurashiki Tōka Cup three times. In addition to major titles, Nakai has won 17 other shogi championships.

==== Major titles ====
Title	Years	Number of times overall
Women's Meijin	1985-86, 1988, 1991–93, 1999, 2001–02	9
Women's Ōshō	1995, 2002–04	4
Women's Ōi	1990-92	3
Kurashiki Tōka Cup	2000-03	3

==== Other championships ====
Tournament	Years	Number of times
^{*}Daiwa Securities Strongest Women's Professional Cup	2008-10	3
^{*}Ladies Open Tournament	1988, 1990, 1994, 1996	4
^{*}Kajima Cup	1998, 2001, 2003	3
^{*}Tenga Cup	2008, 2010	2
^{*}Ladies Invitation Cup	2007-08, 2010–12	5

Note: Tournaments marked with an asterisk (*) are no longer held or currently suspended.

=== Awards and honors ===
Nakai received a number of Japan Shogi Association Annual Shogi Awards and other awards in recognition of her accomplishments in shogi and contributions made to Japanese society.

==== Annual Shogi Awards ====
- 13th Annual Awards (April 1985 – March 1986): Women's Professional Award
- 14th Annual Awards (April 1986 – March 1987): Women's Professional Award
- 16th Annual Awards (April 1888 – March 1989): Women's Professional Award
- 20th Annual Awards (April 1992 – March 1993): Women's Professional Award
- 27th Annual Awards (April 1999 – March 2000): Women's Professional Award
- 29th Annual Awards (April 2001 – March 2002): Women's Professional of the Year
- 30th Annual Awards (April 2002 – March 2003): Women's Professional of the Year
- 31st Annual Awards (April 2003 – March 2004): Women's Professional Award
- 22nd Annual Awards (April 2004 – March 2005): Women's Professional Award
- 38th Annual Awards (April 2010 – March 2011): Women's Professional Most Games Played
- 40th Annual Awards (April 2012 – March 2012): Women's Professional Most Games Played

==== Other awards ====
- 1986, February: Wakkanai, Hokkaido Meritorious Citizen Award

== LPSA representative director ==
Nakai was selected to be the first representative director of The Ladies Professional Shogi-player's Association of Japan (LPSA) after it was established in 2007, and served in that capacity until 2010.

== Personal life ==
Nakai is married to retired shogi professional Yoshiyuki Ueyama. The couple have three daughters. She served as a member of the Warabi, Saitama board of education from 2003 to 2015 and was named a "Warabi City PR Ambassador" in May 2016.

== Gallery ==
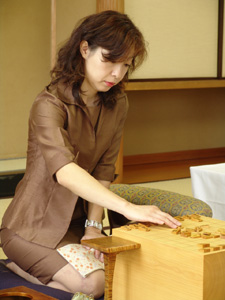
Nakai in February 2013

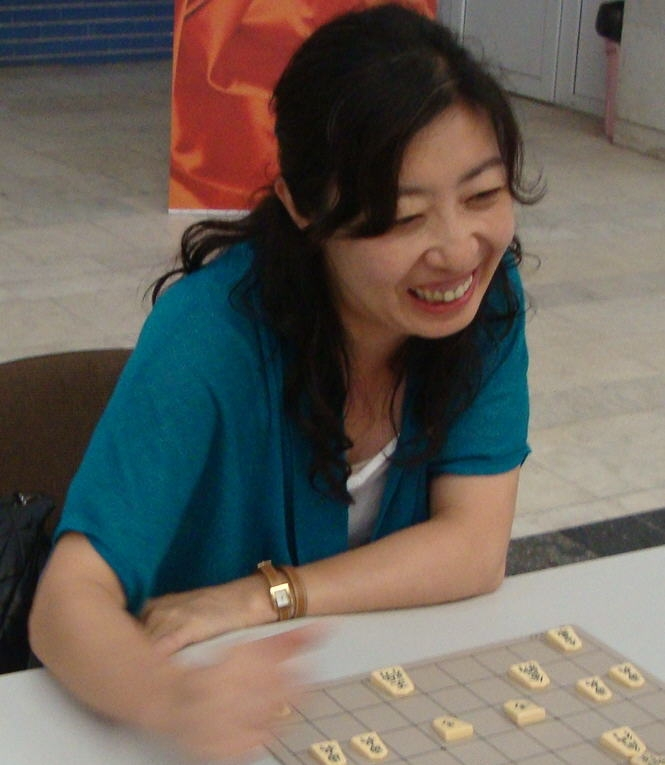
Nakai at the European/World Open Shogi Championships in July 2013
