= Marika Nakamura =

Japanese shogi player

- Native name: 中村真梨花
- Born: May 20, 1987 (age 38)
- Hometown: Fujisawa, Kanagawa

Career
- Achieved professional status: April 1, 2003 (aged 15)
- Badge Number: W-30
- Rank: Women's 4-dan
- Teacher: Yoshimasa Saeki (9-dan)

Websites
- JSA profile page

Marika Nakamura (中村 真梨花, Nakamura Marika; born May 20, 1987) is a Japanese women's professional shogi player ranked 4-dan.

== Women's professional shogi player ==
=== Promotion history ===
Nakamura's promotion history is as follows.

- 2-kyū: April 1, 2003
- 1-kyū: April 1, 2004
- 1-dan: April 1, 2005
- 2-dan: February 25, 2009
- 3-dan: May 4, 2015
- 4-dan: May 13, 2023

Note: All ranks are women's professional ranks.

=== Titles and other championships ===
Nakamura has appeared in women's major title match three times, but has yet to win a major title. She was the challenger for the 17th Kurashiki Tōka Cup title in 2009, the 34th Women's Ōshō title in 2012 and the 40th Women's Meijin title in 2013.

== Personal life ==
Nakamura is married to professional shogi player Shōta Chida. The pair got married in September 2023. In September 2025, Nakamura announced that she had given birth to the couple's first child, a daughter.
