= Harue Tanikawa =

Japanese shogi player (born 1954)

- Native name: 谷川治恵
- Born: February 9, 1954 (age 71)
- Hometown: Saitama Prefecture, Japan
- Nationality: Japanese

Career
- Achieved professional status: September 23, 1976 (aged 22)
- Badge Number: W-2
- Rank: Women's 5-dan
- Retired: April 30, 2002 (aged 48)
- Teacher: Yūji Sase (9-dan)

Websites
- JSA profile page

Harue Tanikawa (谷川 治恵, Tanikawa Harue; born February 9, 1954) is a Japanese retired women's professional shogi player who achieved the rank of 5-dan.

== Early life ==
Tanikawa was born on February 9, 1954, in Saitama Prefecture.

== Women's shogi professional ==
=== Promotion history ===
Tanikawa's promotion history is as follows:

- 1976, September 23: 1-kyū
- 1978, September 10: 1-dan
- 1981, March 19: 2-dan
- 1989, May 22: 3-dan
- 2000, June 28: 4-dan
- 2011, April 1: 5-dan

Note: All ranks are women's professional ranks.

=== Titles and other championships ===
Tanikawa's only major title appearance came in 1980 when she challenged Akiko Takojima for the 3rd Women's Ōshō title. She lost the match 2 games to none.

=== Awards and honors ===
Tanikawa received the Tokyo Shogi Journalists' Association's Annual Shogi Award for the April 2009 – March 2010 shogi year.

== JSA director and other offices ==
Tanikawa was elected to Japan Shogi Association's board of directors as a non-executive director in May 2011, and was reelected to the same position in June 2013 and June 2015.

She also served as the president of the Women's Shogi Professionals' Association from May 2001 until May 2003 and from June 2007 until March 2009.

== Personal life ==
Tanikawa is a graduate of Aoyama Gakuin University.
