= Haruko Saida =

Japanese shogi player (born 1966)

- Native name: 斎田晴子
- Born: December 4, 1966 (age 59)
- Hometown: Yokosuka, Kanagawa Prefecture

Career
- Achieved professional status: April 1, 1986 (aged 19)
- Badge number: W-7
- Rank: Women's 5-dan
- Retired: July 7, 2025 (aged 58)
- Teacher: Yoshimasa Saeki (9-dan)
- Major titles won: 4
- Tournaments won: 2
- Career record: 486–382 (.560)

Websites
- JSA profile page

Haruko Saida (斎田 晴子, Saida Haruko; born December 4, 1966) is a Japanese retired women's professional shogi player who acchieved the rank of 5-dan. She is a former Women's Meijin, Women's Ōshō and Kurashiki Tōka title holder. She is a non-executive director of the Japan Shogi Association.

== Women's shogi professional ==
On April 1, 2025, the JSA announced Saida had met the conditions for mandatory retirement for women's shogi professionals and her retirement would become official upon completion of her final scheduled game of the 2025–2026 shogi season. Saida's retirement became official upon losing to Mikoto Umezu on July 7, 2025, in a Hakurei Class D ranking league game. She finished her career with a record of 486 wins and 382 losses for a winning percentage of 0.560. Saida also finished her career with a record of 9 wins and 28 losses for a winning percentage of 0.242 against regular shogi professionals.

=== Promotion history ===
Saida's promotion history is as follows.

- Women's Professional Apprentice League: 1984
- 3-kyū: April 1, 1986
- 1-kyū: April 1, 1987
- 1-dan: April 1, 1988
- 2-dan: March 20, 1991
- 3-dan: April 1, 1995
- 4-dan: February 27, 2001
- 5-dan: June 9, 2011
- Retired: July 7, 2025

Note: All ranks are women's professional ranks.

=== Titles and other championships ===
Saida has appeared in major title matches twelve times and has won a total of four titles. In addition to major titles, Saida has won two other shogi championships.

==== Major titles ====
| Title | Years | Number of times overall |
|---|---|---|
| Women's Ōshō | 1994, 1997 | 2 |
| Women's Meijin | 2000 | 1 |
| Kurashiki Tōka Cup | 2006 | 1 |

==== Other championships ====
| Tournament | Years | Number of times |
|---|---|---|
| ^{*}Ladies Open Tournament | 2001, 2004 | 2 |

Note: Tournaments marked with an asterisk (*) are no longer held or currently suspended.

=== Awards and honors ===
Saida received the Japan Shogi Association's "Women's Professional" Annual Shogi Award for the April 2000 – March 2001 shogi year. She received the JSA's "25 Years Service Award" in recognition of being an active professional for twenty-five years in 2010.

== JSA director ==
At the JSA's 70th General Meeting held in June 2019, Saida was elected as a non-executive director to the association's board of directors. She was reelected to the same position in June 2021, June 2023 and June 2025.
