= Rieko Yauchi =

Japanese shogi player (born 1980)

Reiko Yauchi
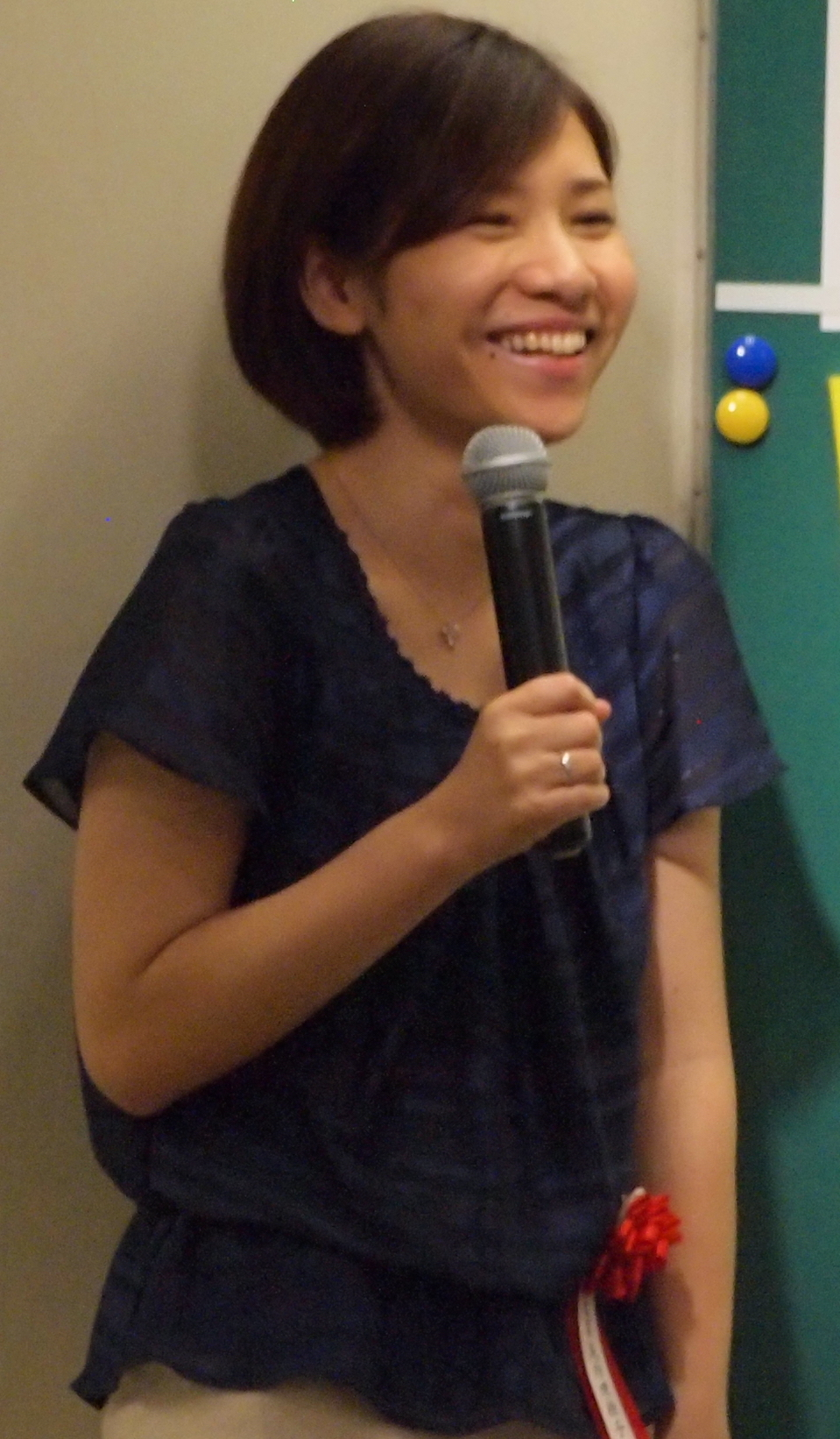
- Yauchi in 2013
- Native name: 矢内理絵子
- Born: January 10, 1980 (age 46)
- Hometown: Gyōda, Saitama Prefecture

Career
- Achieved professional status: April 1, 1993 (aged 13)
- Badge Number: W-16
- Rank: Women's 5-dan
- Teacher: Shigeru Sekine (9-dan)
- Major titles won: 6
- Tournaments won: 2

Websites
- JSA profile page
- Rieko Yauchi on Twitter

Rieko Yauchi (矢内 理絵子, Yauchi Rieko; born January 10, 1980) is a Japanese women's professional shogi player ranked 5-dan. She is a former Women's Meijin, Ōi and Jo-Ō title holder.

== Women's shogi professional ==
=== Promotion history ===
Yauchi's promotion history is as follows.

- Women's Professional Apprentice League: 1990
- 2-kyū: April 1, 1993
- 1-kyū: April 1, 1995
- 1-dan: July 10, 1995
- 2-dan: April 1, 1997
- 3-dan: October 27, 1997
- 4-dan: August 3, 2004
- 5-dan: February 21, 2014

Note: All ranks are women's professional ranks.

=== Titles and other championships ===
Yauchi has appeared in major title matches eighteen times and has won a total of six titles. In addition to major titles, Yauchi has won two other shogi championships.

==== Major titles ====
Title	Years	Number of times overall
Women's Ōi	1997	1
Women's Meijin	2005–07	3
Jo-Ō	2008–09	2

==== Other championships ====
Tournament	Years	Number of times
^{*}Ladies Open Tournament	1998, 2006	2

Note: Tournaments marked with an asterisk (*) are no longer held or currently suspended.

=== Awards and honors ===
Yauchi has received a number of Japan Shogi Association Annual Shogi Awards and other awards in recognition of her accomplishments in shogi and contributions made to Japanese society.

==== Annual shogi awards ====
- 33rd Annual Awards (April 2005 – March 2006): Woman's Professional of the Year
- 34th Annual Awards (April 2006 – March 2007): Women's Professional of the Year
- 35th Annual Awards (April 2007 – March 2008): Women's Professional Award

==== Other awards ====
- 2007, February: 2nd Saitama Kagayaki Ogino Ginko Award
- 2008, July: City of Gyōda Tourism Ambassador
