= Akiko Takojima =

- Native name: 蛸島彰子
- Born: March 19, 1946 (age 80)
- Hometown: Suginami, Tokyo

Career
- Achieved professional status: October 31, 1974 (aged 28)
- Badge number: JSA W-1; LPSA W-1
- Rank: Women's 6-dan
- Retired: February 16, 2018 (aged 71)
- Teacher: Toshio Takayanagi (Honorary 9-dan)
- Major titles won: 7
- Career record: 333–328 (.504)

Websites
- LPSA profile page

Akiko Takojima (蛸島 彰子, Takojima Akiko; born March 19, 1946) is a Japanese retired women's professional shogi player ranked 6-dan. She was the first female to be accepted into the Japan Shogi Association's apprentice school and is also a former Women's Meijin and Ōshō title holder.

== Apprenticeship ==
Takojima was the first female to be accepted into the Japan Shogi Association's apprentice school.

=== Apprentice professional promotion history ===
- 1961: 7-kyū
- 1966: 1-dan

Note: The above are apprentice professional ranks.

== Women's shogi professional ==
Takojima holds the record for being the oldest women's professional to win an official game at 71 years and 9 months.

=== Promotion history ===
Takojima's promotion history is as follows.

- 2-dan: 1967
- 3-dan: October 31, 1974
- 4-dan: November 26, 1976
- 5-dan: November 17, 1988
- 6-dan: May 21, 2017

Note: The above are women's professional ranks.

=== Major titles ===
Takojima appeared in major title matches a total of eleven times and won a total of seven titles. She won the Women's Meijin title four times (1974–76, 1981) and the Women's Ōshō title three times (1978–1980).

=== Awards and honors ===
Takojima won the Japan Shogi Association's "Women's Professional" Annual Shogi Award in 1980 and 1981.
