= Sae Itō =

Japanese shogi player (born 1993)

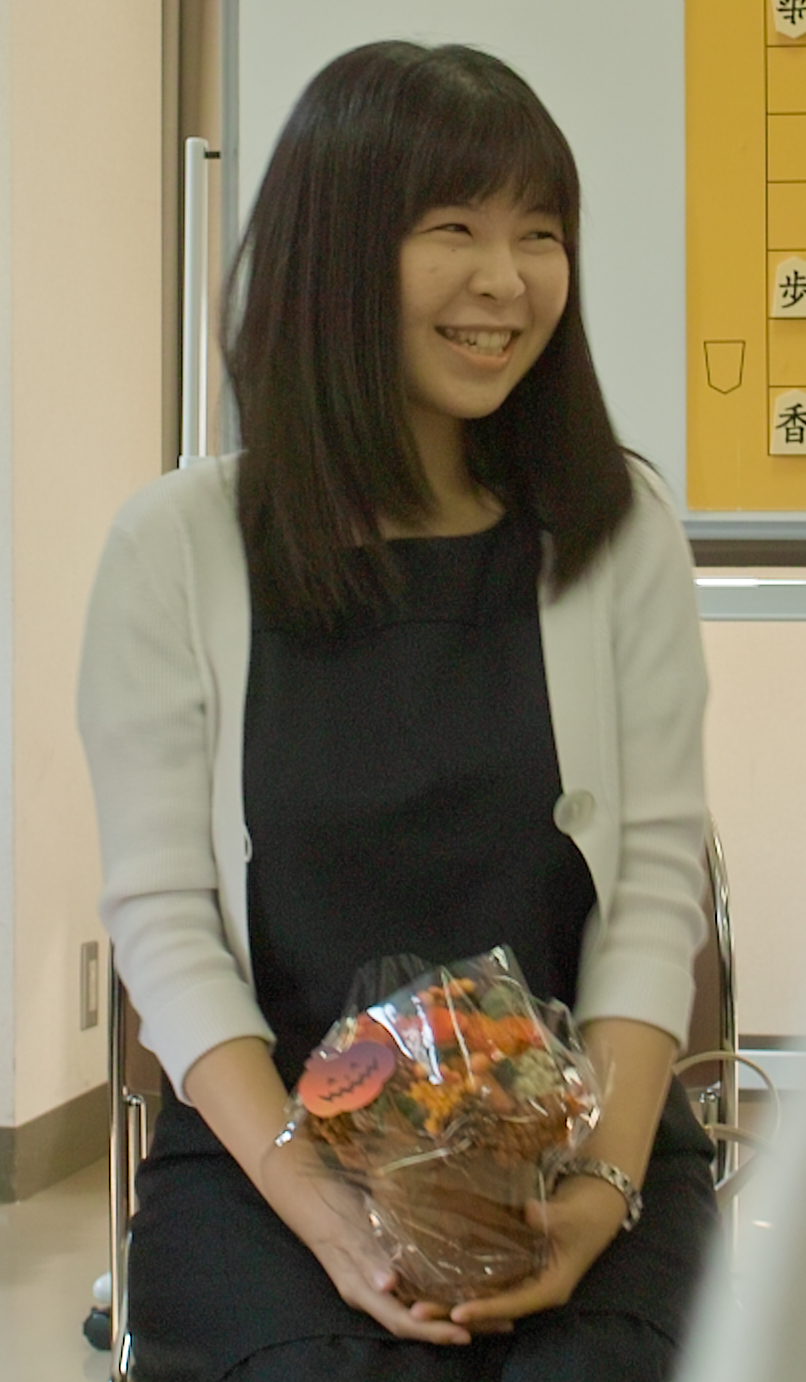
- Itō at an event in October 2016.
- Native name: 伊藤 沙恵
- Born: October 6, 1993 (age 32)
- Hometown: Musashino, Tokyo

Career
- Achieved professional status: October 1, 2014 (aged 20)
- Badge Number: W-52
- Rank: Women's 4-dan
- Teacher: Nobuyuki Yashiki (9-dan)
- Major titles won: 1

Websites
- JSA profile page

Sae Itō (伊藤 沙恵, Itō Sae; born October 6, 1993) is a Japanese women's professional shogi player ranked 4-dan. She is a former holder of the Women's Meijin title.

== Early life and amateur shogi ==
Itō was born in Musashino, Tokyo on October 6, 1993, and learned how to play shogi from her older brother.

As a fifth-grade elementary school student, Itō finished third in the 29th Elementary School Student Meijin Tournament in April 2004. Itō defeated future shogi professional and major title holder Takuya Nagase in her Round 1 game of the Championship Tournament and won two more games to advance to the semi-finals where she lost to another future shogi professional and eventual tournament winner Yūki Sasaki. Itō was the only girl to qualify for the Championship Tournament, and the field included seven boys who would eventually become professional shogi players, including three who would also become major title holders. (Note: The seven were Yūki Sasaki (the tournament winner), Tatsuya Sugai (who finished runner up), Tatsuya Sanmaidō, Takuya Nagase, Shintarō Saitō, Daichi Sasaki and Kōhei Hasabe.) In September 2004, Itō was accepted into the Japan Shogi Association's apprentice school at the rank of 6-kyū under the guidance of shogi professional Nobuyuki Yashiki.

== Women's professional shogi ==
In February 2022, Itō defeated Kana Satomi 3 games to 1 in the 48th Women's Meijin title match (January – February 2022) to capture her first women's major title. In February of the following year, however, she was unable to successfully defend her Meijin title, losing the 49th Women's Meijin title match to Tomoka Nishiyama 3 games to 1.

In April – June 2023, Ito challenged Satomi for the latter's Women's Ōi title, but lost the 34th Women's Ōi title match 3 games to 1.

Itō challenged Fukuma (née Satomi) for the Kurashiki Tōka title in the 32nd Kurashiki Tōka Cup (February – March 2025) title match, but Fukuma won the match 2 games to none to defend her title. The match was originally scheduled to take place in November 2024, but was rescheduled due to Fukuma going on maternity leave. Itō and Fukuma faced each other again in the 36th Women's Ōi title match (April–June 2025), but Fukuma won the match 3 games to 2 to defend her Women's Ōi title. Itō had actually lost to Nishiyama in the finals of the challenger determination tournament in March but was selected to replace Nishiyama after the latter withdrew due to illness the day before the title match was scheduled to begin.

Itō advanced to 33rd Kurashiki Tōka Title Match to challenge Fukuma for the Kurashiki Tōka Title in November 2025 but lost the best-of-three match 2 games to 1.

=== Promotion history ===
Ito's promotion history is as follows.

- 1-dan: October 1, 2014
- 2-dan: September 11, 2015
- 3-dan: April 26, 2019
- 4-dan: April 18, 2023

Note: All ranks are women's professional ranks.

=== Major titles ===
Itō has appeared in a women's professional shogi major title fourteen times and has won one title.

=== Awards and honors ===
Itō received the Japan Shogi Association's Annual Shogi Awards for "Excellent Women's Professional" twice (2017 and 2019), "Most Games Played by a Women's Professional" four times (2017, 2018, 2019 and 2022) and "Women's Professional Game of the Year" once (2022).
