= Ayaka Ōshima =

Japanese shogi player

- Native name: 大島綾華
- Born: January 31, 2003 (age 23)
- Hometown: Hiroshima, Japan

Career
- Achieved professional status: May 1, 2021 (aged 18)
- Badge number: W-74
- Rank: Women's 2-dan
- Teacher: Nobuo Mori (7-dan)

Websites
- JSA profile page

Ayaka Ōshima (大島 綾華, Ōshima Ayaka; born January 31, 2003) is a Japanese women's professional shogi player ranked 2-dan.

== Early life and becoming a women's shogi professional ==
Ōshima was born in Hiroshima, Japan on January 31, 2003. She learned how to play shogi from her father.

Ōshima entered the Japan Shogi Association's training group system under the guidance of shogi professional Nobuo Mori. She satisfied the criteria for the rank of women's professional 2-kyū upon obtaining promotion to Training Group B2. She petitioned the JSA to be allowed to become a women's professional, and the JSA announced that she would be awarded women's professional status and the rank of 2-kyū on April 30, 2021.

== Women's shogi professional ==
In March 2024, Ōshima defeated Keika Kitamura in the finals of the 17th Women's Mynavi Open challenger tournament to earn the right to challenge Tomoka Nishiyama for the Jo-Ō title; Oshima's first appearance in a major title match, however, was unsuccessful as she lost the best-of-five title match (April 2024 – May 2024) against Nishiyama 3 games to 0.

Ōshima qualified for her second major title match in March 2026 when she defeated Yui Isoya in the finals of the 37th Women's Ōi Tournament's challenger league; Ōshima, however, lost the 37th Women's Ōi Title Match (April–May 2026) to Women's Ōi Kana Fukuma 3 games to none.

=== Promotion history ===
Ōshima's promotion history is as follows:

- 2-kyū: May 1, 2021
- 1-kyū: June 26, 2021
- 1-dan: April 1, 2022
- 2-dan: March 4, 2024

Note: All ranks are women's professional ranks.

=== Titles and other championships ===
Ōshima has appeared in a women's professional shogi major title match twice but has yet to win a major title.
