= Hatsumi Ueda =

Japanese Shogi player

- Native name: 上田初美
- Born: November 16, 1988 (age 37)
- Hometown: Kodaira, Tokyo

Career
- Achieved professional status: April 1, 2001 (aged 12)
- Badge number: W-26
- Rank: Women's 5-dan
- Teacher: Hatasu Itō (8-dan)
- Major titles won: 2
- Tournaments won: 1

Websites
- JSA profile page

Hatsumi Ueda (上田 初美, Ueda Hatsumi; born November 16, 1988) is a Japanese women's professional shogi player ranked 5-dan. She is a former Women's Jo-Ō title holder.

== Women's shogi professional ==
=== Promotion history ===
Ueda's promotion history is as follows.

- 2-kyū: April 1, 2001
- 1-kyū: April 1, 2002
- 1-dan: April 1, 2003
- 2-dan: June 30, 2008
- 3-dan: May 10, 2011
- 4-dan: May 21, 2018
- 5-dan: October 2, 2025

Note: All ranks are women's professional ranks.

=== Titles and other championships ===
Ueda has appeared in major title matches nine times and has won a total of two titles: she won the Women's Jo-Ō title in 2011 and 2012. In addition to major titles, Ueda has won one other shogi championships: the 6th Daiwa Securities Strongest Women's Professional Cup in 2012.

=== Awards and honors ===
Ueda has received a number of Japan Shogi Association Annual Shogi Awards: "Women's Professional Most Games Played" (2009); "Women's Professional Award" and "Game of the Year Special Prize" (2012); "Women's Professional Award" and "Game of the Year Special Prize" (2016); and "Game of the Year Special Prize" (2018).

== Personal life ==
Ueda is married to shogi professional Takuma Oikawa. The couple were married in June 2013 and have two daughters as of October 2018.
