= Yuki Muroya =

Japanese Shogi player

- Native name: 室谷由紀
- Born: March 6, 1993 (age 32)
- Hometown: Ōsakasayama, Osaka

Career
- Achieved professional status: July 17, 2010 (aged 17)
- Badge Number: W-42
- Rank: Women's 3-dan
- Teacher: Nobuo Mori (7-dan)

Websites
- JSA profile page

Yuki Muroya (室谷 由紀 Muroya Yuki, born March 6, 1993) is a Japanese women's professional shogi player ranked 3-dan.

== Women's shogi professional ==
=== Promotion history ===
Muroya's promotion history is as follows.

- 3-kyū: October 1, 2009
- 2-kyū: July 17, 2010
- 1-kyū: July 17, 2010
- 1-dan: April 1, 2011
- 2-dan: August 25, 2015
- 3-dan: December 27, 2019

Note: All ranks are women's professional ranks.

=== Titles and other championships ===
Muroya has appeared in major titles match five times, but has yet to win a major title. She was the challenger for the 9th MyNavi Women's Open Jo-Ō title in 2016, the 24th and 26th Kurashiki Tōka Cup titles in 2016 and 2018, the 46th Women's Meijin title in 2020 and the 42nd Ōshō title also in 2020.

=== Awards and honors ===
Muroya received the Japan Shogi Association's "Women's Professional" and "Women's Professional Most Games Played" Annual Shogi Awards for the April 2015 – March 2016 shogi year, and the "Women's Professional Most Games Played" award for the April 2016 – March 2017 shogi year.

== Personal life ==
In March 2018, Muroya announced that she had gotten married on her 25th birthday and would be competing under her married name Taniguchi (谷口).

In February 2020, Muroya announced she had divorced and would return to using Muroya as her name.

Muroya remarried in January 2021, but this time decided to keep competing under her maiden name.
