= Tomomi Kai =

Japanese shogi player (born 1983)

- Native name: 甲斐智美
- Born: May 30, 1983 (age 42)
- Hometown: Nanao, Ishikawa

Career
- Achieved professional status: April 1, 1997 (aged 13)
- Badge Number: W-21
- Rank: Women's 5-dan
- Retired: July 3, 2023 (aged 40)
- Teacher: Makoto Nakahara (16th Lifetime Meijin)
- Major titles won: 7
- Tournaments won: 2
- Career record: 360–221 (.620)

Websites
- JSA profile page

Tomomi Kai (甲斐 智美, Kai Tomomi; born May 30, 1983) is a retired Japanese women's professional shogi player who achieved the rank of 5-dan. She is a former Women's Ōi, Kurashiki Tōka Cup, and Jo-Ō title holder.

== Apprentice professional ==
In September 1998, Kai took a leave of absence from women's professional shogi to enter the Japan Shogi Association's apprentice school at the rank of 6-kyū. She remained in the apprentice school until August 2003 when she expressed her intention to return to women's professional play. She was awarded the rank of women's professional 1-dan upon reinstatement.

== Women's shogi professional ==
=== Promotion history ===
Kai has been promoted as follows.

- 2-kyū: April 1, 1997
- 1-kyū: April 1, 1998
- 1-dan: September 1, 2003
- 2-dan: September 18, 2006
- 3-dan: April 19, 2010
- 4-dan: June 29, 2011
- 5-dan: November 23, 2014

Note: All ranks are women's professional ranks.

=== Titles and other championships ===
Kai has appeared in major title matches 14 times and has won a total of 7 titles. She has won the Women's Ōi title four times (2010–11, 2013–14), the Kurashiki Tōka Cup title twice (2013–14), and the Jo-Ō title once (2010). In addition to major titles, Kai has won two other shogi championships: the 11th Women's Kashima Cup Shogi Tournament in 2006 and the 1st Daiwa Securities Cup Women's Internet Tournament in 2007.

=== Awards and honors ===
Kai has received the following Japan Shogi Association Annual Shogi Awards: "Women's Professional Award" in 2010 and 2013, and "Women's Professional of the Year" in 2014.

=== Retirement ===
The Japan Shogi Association announced on March 7, 2023, on its official website that Kai was going to retire from women's professional shogi for personal reasons once she completed her current schedule of official games. Kai's retirement became official on July 3, 2023. Kai finished her career with a record of 360 wins and 221 losses for a winning percentage of 62 percent.
