= Ichiyo Shimizu =

Japanese shogi player (born 1969)

- Native name: 清水市代
- Born: January 9, 1969 (age 57)
- Hometown: Higashimurayama, Tokyo

Career
- Achieved professional status: April 1, 1985 (aged 16)
- Badge number: W-7
- Rank: Women's 7-dan
- Teacher: Toshio Takayanagi (9-dan)
- Lifetime titles: Queen Meijin; Queen Ōshō; Queen Ōi; Queen Kurashiki Tōka
- Major titles won: 43
- Tournaments won: 11
- Notable students: Sachio Ishibashi

Websites
- JSA profile page

Ichiyo Shimizu (清水 市代, Shimizu Ichiyo; born January 9, 1969) is a Japanese women's professional shogi player ranked 7-dan. In May 2017, Shimizu became the first woman to be elected as an executive director to the Japan Shogi Association's board of directors. In June 2025, she became the first woman to be elected the association's president.

== Early life and apprentice women's shogi professional ==
Shimizu was born on January 9, 1969, in Higashimurayama, Tokyo. In 1983, she won the 15th Amateur Women's Meijin Tournament while she was a junior high school student. That same year, she entered the Japan Shogi Association's Women's Professional Apprentice League under the guidance of shogi professional Toshio Takayanagi. She achieved the rank of women's professional 2-kyū in April 1985, thus becoming the first apprentice to graduate from the Women's Professional Apprentice League system.

== Women's shogi professional ==
In October 2000, Shimizu became the first women's professional to be promoted to the rank of women's 6-dan.

In November 2016, Shimizu defeated Tomomi Kai in a women's meijin league game to become the second women's professional to win 600 official games.

As of January 2018, Shimizu's career record versus male professionals in official games is 29 wins and 156 losses.

=== Promotion history ===
Shimizu has been promoted as follows.

- 2-kyū: April 1, 1985
- 1-dan: January 17, 1986
- 2-dan: September 21, 1987
- 3-dan: February 8, 1988
- 4-dan: April 1, 1992
- 5-dan: April 1, 1995
- 6-dan: October 1, 2000
- 7-dan: April 1, 2020

Note: All ranks are women's professional ranks.

=== Titles and other championships ===
Shimizu has appeared in major title matches a total of 70 times and has won a total of 43 titles. She has won the Women's Meijin title ten times, the Women's Ōshō title nine times, the Women's Ōi title fourteen times and the Kurashiki Tōka Cup ten times. She has been awarded the lifetime titles of Queen Meijin, Queen Ōshō, Queen Ōi and Queen Kurashiki Tōka. In addition to major titles, Shimizu has won 11 other shogi championships.

==== Major titles ====
Title	Years	Number of times
Women's Meijin	1987, 1989, 1994–98, 2003–04, 2008	10
Women's Ōshō	1991, 1993, 1996, 1998, 2000–01, 2007–09	9
Women's Ōi	1993–96, 1998–2006, 2009	14
Kurashiki Tōka Cup	1994–2000, 2004–05, 2007	10

==== Other championships ====
Tournament	Years	Number of times
^{*}Daiwa Securities Strongest Women's Professional Cup	2011	1
^{*}Ladies Open Tournament	1987, 1991–1993, 1997, 2003, 2003	7
^{*}Kajima Cup	1997, 1999, 2004	3

Note: Tournaments marked with an asterisk (*) are no longer held or currently suspended.

=== Awards and honors ===
Shimizu has received a number of Japan Shogi Association Annual Shogi Awards and other awards in recognition of her accomplishments in shogi and contributions made to Japanese society.

==== Annual Shogi Awards ====
- 15th Annual Awards (April 1987 – March 1988): Women's Professional Award
- 19th Annual Awards (April 1991 – March 1992): Women's Professional Award
- 21st Annual Awards (April 1993 – March 1994): Women's Professional Award
- 22nd Annual Awards (April 1994 – March 1995): Women's Professional Award
- 23rd Annual Awards (April 1995 – March 1996): Women's Professional Award
- 24th Annual Awards (April 1996 – March 1997): Women's Professional Award, Special Award
- 25th Annual Awards (April 1997 – March 1998): Women's Professional Award
- 26th Annual Awards (April 1998 – March 1999): Women's Professional Award
- 28th Annual Awards (April 2000 — March 2001): Women's Professional of the Year
- 29th Annual Awards (April 2001 — March 2002): Women's Professional Award
- 31st Annual Awards (April 2003 — March 2004): Women's Professional of the Year
- 32nd Annual Awards (April 2004 — March 2005): Women's Professional of the Year
- 35th Annual Awards (April 2007 — March 2008): Women's Professional of the Year
- 36th Annual Awards (April 2008 — March 2009): Women's Professional of the Year
- 37th Annual Awards (April 2009 — March 2010): Women's Professional of the Year
- 38th Annual Awards (April 2010 — March 2011): Women's Professional Most Games Played
- 39th Annual Awards (April 2011 — March 2012): Women's Professional Award, Women's Professional Most Games Played
- 42nd Annual Awards (April 2014 — March 2015): Women's Professional Most Games Played

==== Other awards ====
- 1996, June: Minister of Education Award
- 1997, February: Tokyo Resident Culture Honor Award (Awarded by the Governor of Tokyo in recognition of cultural achievements by a Tokyoite)
- 2000, November: Higashimurayama, Tokyo Resident Honor Award
- 2008, August: Kurashiki Shogi Culture Honor Award
- 2009: 25 Years Service Award (Awarded by the JSA in recognition of being an active professional for twenty-five years)

== JSA executive ==
In May 2017, Shimizu became the first woman to be elected as an executive director to the Japan Shogi Association's board of directors. She was re-elected to additional two-year terms in June 2019, June 2021 and June 2023. On June 6, 2025, Shimizu became the first woman elected president of the association.
