= Reo Koyama =

Japanese shogi player

- Native name: 小山怜央
- Born: July 2, 1993 (age 32)
- Hometown: Kamaishi, Iwate, Japan

Career
- Achieved professional status: April 1, 2023 (aged 29)
- Badge Number: 335
- Rank: 4-dan
- Teacher: Tadao Kitajima (7-dan)
- Ryūō class: 6

Websites
- JSA profile page

Reo Koyama (小山 怜央, Koyama Reo; July 2, 1993) is a Japanese professional shogi player ranked 4-dan. He is the third person since the end of World War II to be awarded professional status by the Japan Shogi Association (JSA) for passing the Professional Admission Test and the first to do so who was not a former member of the JSA's apprentice school. Koyama is also the first person from Iwate Prefecture to be awarded professional shogi player status.

== Early life, education and amateur shogi ==
Koyama was born in Kamaishi, Iwate, on July 2, 1993. He learned how to play shogi when he was a second-grade elementary school student. As a junior high school student, he finished third in the 27th All-Japan Junior High School Student Invitational Shogi Tournament in 2006 and third in the 33rd Junior High School Student Shogi Meijin Tournament in 2008. In 2008, while still a third-grade junior high school student, he took the admission test for the JSA's apprentice school but did not pass.

In 2011, Koyama and his family were forced to evacuate their home and move into temporary housing due to the 2011 Tōhoku earthquake and tsunami. A second-grade senior high school student at the time, Koyama continued living in temporary housing until graduating from high school, and mainly played shogi online. As a third-grade university student at Iwate Prefectural University in 2014, Koyama won the 70th All-Japan University Student Meijin Tournament, and he won the 69th All-Japan Amateur Meijin Tournament the following year (2015) as a fourth-grade university student.

On June 17, 2016, the JSA posted on its official website that it had accepted Koyama's application to take its apprentice school 3-dan League Admission Test stating that Koyama satisfied the criteria for taking the test by winning the All-Japan Amateur Meijin Tournament the previous year, and also by being sponsored for the test by shogi professional Tadao Kitajima. The JSA stated that Koyama would be allowed to participate in apprentice professional school games starting in August 2016 as an apprentice professional 2-dan, and his test would consist of eight games against other apprentice professionals; Koyama would need to win six games to pass the test in order to participate in the 60th 3-dan League season scheduled to begin in October 2016. On September 3, 2016, the JSA announced that Koyama had failed to pass the test after losing for the third time in five games. Even though he failed in his attempt to enter the apprentice professional 3-dan League, Koyama still continued to perform at a high level in national amateur shogi tournaments, including winning the 33rd All-Japan Amateur Ōshō Tournament in December 2016 while still at university, and the 5th Red Flag Meijin Tournament in November 2017.

Koyama graduated from Iwate Prefectural University's Faculty of Software and Informational Science in March 2017. After graduation, he began working as a systems engineer for Ricoh, a company known for having a strong shogi team, in April 2018. While working for Ricoh, Koyama continued to perform in national amateur shogi tournaments both as an individual and as a member of Ricoh's shogi team in 2018 and 2019, but the Japanese government's declaration of a state of emergency in response to the COVID-19 pandemic in April 2020 led to the cancellation of most amateur shogi in-person tournaments for the unforeseeable future. Although he was able to work from home during the state of emergency, Koyama's desire to become a professional shogi player was still strong, Koyama decided to quit his job in February 2021 so as to be able to study shogi full-time with the goal of qualifying for the JSA's Professional Admission Test before turning 30 years old. After quitting his job, Koyama earned money as a part-time shogi teacher and also lived off his unemployment insurance and personal savings; he also continued to perform well in amateur shogi tournaments, winning the 50th East-Japan JSA Shogi Club Meijin Tournament in April 2021 and the 35th Amateur Ryūō Tournament in June 2022. Finishing first or second in major national amateur tournaments allowed Koyama to qualify for certain professional shogi tournaments for which several spots were reserved for top amateur players over the years. From July 2010 (when he was 17 years old) until November 2022 (when he was 29 years old), Koyama qualified to participate in professional shogi tournaments 15 times and achieved a record of 16 wins against 15 losses.

=== Professional Admission Test ===
On September 30, 2022, the JSA posted on its official website that it had received an application from Koyama on September 28 asking to be allowed to take the Professional Admission Test. The JSA approved Koyama's application stating that he satisfied the qualifications of the test after winning his September 13 game in the 16th Asahi Cup Open tournament. (Note: The Asahi Cup Open is an annual professional shogi tournament in which amateur players who have won or performed well at national amateur tournaments during the same year may be allowed to participate. The results are considered official tournament results for professional players.) The victory gave Koyama 10 wins in his most recent 15 games in official professional tournaments, which allowed him to satisfy the test's requirements of 10 or more wins and a winning percentage of 0.650 or greater is such games. Koyama became the fourth person to qualify to take the test since it was established. (Note: The other three were amateur Kenji Imaizumi, amateur Shōgo Orita and women's professional Kana Fukuma; a fifth person, women's professional Tomoka Nishiyama qualified for the test in 2024 but did not pass.)

The JSA announced that Koyama's test would begin in November 2022, and that it would consist of a best-of-five series a games against the five professional players to most recently have obtained regular professional status. Koyama would play one game a month at either the JSA headquarters in Tokyo or its Kansai Branch Office, and his five opponents (in order) would be Kenshi Tokuda, Reo Okabe, Mikio Kariyama, Tomoki Yokoyama and Akihiro Takada, with the test ending as soon as Koyama won or lost three out of the five games.

Koyama defeated Tokuda in Game 1 of the test in 166 moves on November 28 at the Kansai Branch Office, and then defeated Okabe in Game 2 in 111 moves at the JSA headquarters in Tokyo on December 12 to win the first two games of the test. He lost Game 3 to Kariyama in 165 moves on January 20, 2023 at the Kansai Branch Office for his first loss of the test, which meant he needed to win one of his next two games to pass. Game 4 against Yokoyama was played on February 13 at the Kansai Branch Office. Koyama won the game in 133 moves for his third win in four games and passed the test. Koyama became the first person who was not a former member of the JSA's apprentice school to be awarded regular professional status, and the third person to obtain such status via the Professional Admission Test since the test was established. (Note: Kenji Imaizumi passed the test in December 2014, and Shōgo Orita passed the test in February 2020.) He also became the first person from Iwate Prefecture to become a professional shogi player. The JSA announced after the game that Koyama would officially be awarded regular professional status and the rank of 4-dan on April 1, 2023.

== Shogi professional ==
Koyama became the twelfth professional overall since the end of World War II and the first who never attended the JSA's apprentice professional school to meet the qualifications for moving out of Free Class play and into Class C2 of Meijin Ranking Tournament play when he defeated Kōji Tanigawa in Round 2 of the 74th NHK TV Shogi Tournament in July 2024.

=== Promotion history ===
The promotion history for Koyama is as follows.

- 4-dan: April 1, 2023

=== Awards and honours ===
Koyama received the Tokyo Shogi Reporters' Association (東京将棋記者会 (Tōkyō Shōgi Kisha Kai)) award for 2023.
