= 1... R-32 opening =

1... R-32 opening
☖ pieces in hand: –

9	8	7	6	5	4	3	2	1
香	桂	銀	金	王	金	銀	桂	香	1
						飛	角		2
歩	歩	歩	歩	歩	歩	歩	歩	歩	3
									4
									5
		歩							6
歩	歩		歩	歩	歩	歩	歩	歩	7
	角						飛		8
香	桂	銀	金	玉	金	銀	桂	香	9

☗ pieces in hand: –
1. R-78 opening
☖ pieces in hand: –

9	8	7	6	5	4	3	2	1
香	桂	銀	金	王	金	銀	桂	香	1
	飛						角		2
歩	歩	歩	歩	歩	歩	歩	歩	歩	3
									4
									5
									6
歩	歩	歩	歩	歩	歩	歩	歩	歩	7
	角	飛							8
香	桂	銀	金	玉	金	銀	桂	香	9

☗ pieces in hand: –

In shogi, 1... R-32 (2手目☖3二飛 niteme san-ni hi) is a Third File Rook opening in which White's rook is positioned on the 32 square on White's first move.

When played by Black, the opening is known as 1. R-78 (初手7八飛 shote nana-hachi hi).

== Characteristics of this strategy ==
After Black's first move ▲7-six Pawn, if White aims for the Ishida Style, traditionally White would play 2nd move △3-four Pawn, followed by ▲2-six Pawn, △3-five Pawn, and so on. However, research showed that White often ended up with a disadvantageous position. Therefore, a new approach was devised where White deploys the Rook to the 3rd file on the 2nd move, aiming for the Ishida Style (see diagram 1). Subsequently, the game progresses with ▲2-six Pawn, △6-two King, ▲2-five Pawn, △3-four Pawn, and so forth. In this position, Black has the option of exchanging the Bishop with ▲2-two Bishop Takes, △Same Silver, and then playing ▲6-five Bishop (see diagram 2), allowing the creation of a Horse. Initially, this was considered disadvantageous for Black, but further research showed that Black also had promising moves, leading to the attention of professionals on the 2nd move 3-2 Flying Rook as a new strategy.

As a countermeasure from the Black side, there's a tactic of advancing the pawn to 9-six on the 3rd move. The exchange with △9-four Pawn is commonly believed to put Black in a slightly difficult position. From Black's perspective, allowing White to occupy the 9-fifth square is one possible development. Additionally, there's a strategy of playing ▲7-seven Bishop on the 3rd move, aiming for a Double Wing Rook formation. According to Kubo Toshiaki, as of 2011, there isn't a straightforward sequence that makes White's position significantly better.

=== History ===
- The originator of this strategy is Kenji Imaizumi, who was an amateur player before being admitted through the third dan league entrance exam into the Kansai Shogi Association. It was then transmitted to the Kanto region through Kubo Toshiaki. Hiroshi Tanigawa became acquainted with this playing style through Kubo's guidance during study sessions.
- In actual games, Yuya Nagaoka first used this strategy in an official match against Amahiko Sato during the Ryuo Tournament 6th Group on December 11, 2007 (resulting in Amahiko Satoh's victory). Subsequently, Kubo attracted attention by using it in the A-Class Ranking Tournament, while Yoshiharu Habu employed it in the semifinals of the Asahi Cup. Due to this strategy, Imaizumi became the first recipient of the 35th Masuda Kozo Award as a recommendation member. In the final tournament of the Ryuo Tournament in 2010, Kubo attempted it again against Tadahisa Maruyama, resulting in a repetition of moves. Since Kubo introduced "Kubo's Ishida Style" in 2011, research and examples of practical application have continued, with new variations also emerging.
- In the 2011 Ryuo Tournament 1st Group, Yasumitsu Satoh displayed a new move with the 2nd move △3-two Flying Rook, followed by the 4th move △4-two Silver, securing a victory against Kazuki Kimura. In the 2018 Ryuo Tournament 1st Group, 5th place playoff, Satoh Yasu also defeated Tetsuro Itodani using this same strategy. In the 2011 A-Class Ranking Tournament, Koji Tanigawa defeated Akira Watanabe. In the 4th game of the 2012 Oza Tournament, Yoshiharu Habu adopted this strategy against Akira Watanabe, resulting in a repetition of moves.
- In 2015, Koji Tosa employed this strategy against Kazuki Kimura and emerged victorious. In 2017, Bungo Fukusaki and Tatsuya Sugai also adopted it but were defeated. Hiroshi Miyamoto also used it against Ryo Shimamoto; however, he found himself in a disadvantageous position with his Rook being confined to his own camp, leading to a strategic disadvantage. Nonetheless, he managed to stage a comeback victory due to a oversight by his opponent in the endgame.
- In 2018, Takanori Anyouji utilized this strategy against Yoshikazu Minami but suffered a defeat. In 2019, Daisuke Suzuki employed it against Keita Inoue.

=== Evaluation ===
- Yasumitsu Satoh has stated that he initially thought 2nd move 3-2 Flying Rook was "logically impossible".
- Toshiyuki Moriuchi has described it as "a big discovery akin to Columbus's egg".
- Takeshi Fujii has stated, "Actually, I have studied this move in the past". Fujii considers it powerful if it leads to the Ishida Style, but he would not play it if Black starts with ▲2-six Pawn.

In "The Chess View of Image and Reading," Hiroshi Tanigawa mentions an instance where he received this move from Toshiaki Kubo during a study session. In that game, it led to a sequence where ultimately White couldn't criticize Black's moves, and it ended up in mutual territorial enclosures. Tanigawa also expressed admiration after observing other official games. Akira Watanabe suggests that even though he sets up for the Ishida Style, in one game of shogi, since the Rook doesn't need to block the Bishop's diagonal, he doesn't have to play that move, but he admits that he struggles with whether to execute △3-two Flying Rook in the sequence ▲2-six Pawn, △6-two King, ▲2-five Pawn, △3-four Pawn, ▲2-two Bishop Takes, △Same Silver, ▲6-five Bishop, △7-four Bishop, ▲4-three Bishop Promoted, △4-seven Bishop Promoted, ▲5-eight Gold Right, △7-four Horse. Takeshi Fujii also regards this sequence as surprisingly challenging. Additionally, in the 2008 Oza Tournament, Yoshiharu Habu actually adopted it, with the result in professional games until August 2008 being 5 wins, 7 losses, and 1 repetition.

== Beginner's 7 Eight Flying Strategy ==
See also " Angle exchange rook #first move 7 eight flies (△3 two flies) angle exchange type "

- The 7th-file Rook strategy, initially employed by Kubo Toshiaki in the 66th Osho Title Match in 2016, resulted in a victory against Masataka Goda. Kubo attempted it again in the 11th round of the 76th A-Class Meijin League in 2017 against Fukaura Koichi but suffered a defeat. He also used it in the 7-game Osho Title Match in the 68th Osho Tournament against Watanabe Akira, transitioning to a Right Fourth File Rook after setting up a Left Mino Castle, displaying a strategy reminiscent of a Flank Pawn-Advantage Rook.
- Among professional players, it's attributed to Kazuo Manabe as the first adopter. Additionally, Koji Tosa used it in the Galaxy Tournament, securing a victory by either advancing ▲76 Pawn followed by ▲77 Rook to defend the 8th file, (Note: Even if the corner road on the back side is open, the corner rook exchange will proceed in the order of advantage to the first player .) (Note: The mechanism of △8 six steps, same step, and same fly from the draw is ▲7 eight gold, with multiple strings attached to the two big pieces, giving the first player an advantage (Tosa's explanation in other games, November 12, 2020)) or after advancing ▲77 Bishop followed by ▲59 Bishop to the bottommost row, often leading to an early Ishida formation.
- In 2017, Yamamoto Hiroshi (at the time 3-dan), Tatsuya Sugai in the Oza Title Match, and Takeuchi Yugo in the Asahi Cup all attempted it
- Keita Kadokura frequently adopts it (specializing in the ▲77 Knight to ▲85 Knight jumping order), (Note: Kadokura himself calls it "8 Gokatsura Pon" (commentary of the actual score of "Shogi World"). The direction, timing, and aim of bouncing are different from Ponpon Katsura, a rook with a similar name .) and it was elucidated as the "Cat Trick Strategy (Revolutionary First Move 7-8 Rook Strategy)" in the October 2013 issue of "Shogi World." (Note: ^ This tactic is also described in the 9th episode of "Etotama", "Kacho Fugetsu", which was supervised by Kadokura.) In recent years, Nishida Takuya and Yuta Komori have commonly used it, with Nishida employing it in multiple matches, including the Meijin Title Match surpassing ten games (1000th move) [Note 4], and Furumori in the Ryuo Title Match exceeding 15 games.
- In 2018, Satomi Kana used it against Shimamoto Ryo, and Sasaki Shin used it against Tatsuya Sanmaido, but both ended in defeat. Sasaki is also known for frequently employing this strategy and has showcased it to viewers in televised shogi matches. Murata Akihiro has also utilized it several times.
- In 2019, Nishiyama Tomoka employed it against Yamamoto Hiroshi, who often utilized this strategy in the Shogi Training Group, resulting in a loss. Yamamoto himself has used it against Sanmaidou Tatsuya and others. Nishiyama continued to experiment with it against several players in 2020.
- In 2021, Kiyozumi Kiriyama adopted the strategy in a high-stakes match where defeat would mean retirement. While the game was evenly matched until the middle game, he secured victory in the attacking phase, ensuring at least one more year of active play.

== See also ==
- Third File Rook
- Ranging Rook

== Bibliography ==
- 長岡, 裕也. 2008. 2手目の革新: 3二飛車戦法. 毎日コミュニケーションズ.
- 佐藤, 康光. 2010. 佐藤康光の石田流破り. 日本将棋連盟.
- 久保, 利明. 2011. 久保の石田流. 日本将棋連盟.
