= R32 =

R32 may refer to:

== Automobiles ==
- BMW R32, a motorcycle
- Nissan Skyline (R32), a mid-size car
- Nissan Skyline GT-R (R32), a sports car
- Volkswagen Golf Mk4 R32, a 2003 compact car
- Volkswagen Golf Mk5 R32, a 2005 compact car

== Other uses ==
- R32 (airship), of the Royal Navy
- R32 (New York City Subway car)
- 1... R-32 opening, a shogi opening
- Difluoromethane, a refrigerant labelled R-32
- R32: Contact with acids liberates very toxic gas, a risk phrase
- Small nucleolar RNA R32/R81/Z41
- R32 (space group), number 155
