= Ishida (shogi) =

Major variation in Third File Rook openings of the Japanese game of shōgi

Ishida vs Static Rook
☖ pieces in hand: –

9	8	7	6	5	4	3	2	1
香	桂				金		桂	香	1
	飛			金			王		2
		歩	銀	歩	歩	角	銀		3
歩			歩			歩	歩	歩	4
	歩	歩							5
歩		飛	歩	銀				歩	6
角	歩	桂		歩	歩	歩	歩		7
				金		銀	玉		8
香					金		桂	香	9

☗ pieces in hand: –
(with Mino castle)

The Ishida Opening (石田流三間飛車 ishida-ryū sankenbisha or shorter form 石田流 ishida-ryū) is a major variation in Third File Rook openings of the Japanese game of shōgi.

In the Ishida Opening, in contrast to other Third File Rook openings, the seventh file pawn is advanced to the fifth rank if played by Black (P-75), or the third file pawn if played by White (P-35). This allows the rook to move up to the 76 square (Black) or 34 square (White).

== History ==
Hironiwa vs Ishida 1649
☖ pieces in hand: 歩

9	8	7	6	5	4	3	2	1
香	桂	銀	金				桂	王	1
		王		金			角		2
歩	歩	歩	歩	歩	銀		歩		3
					歩	飛		歩	4
									5
歩		歩	歩	歩				歩	6
	歩				歩	歩	歩		7
	角	銀		飛	銀	金	玉		8
香	桂		金				桂	香	9

☗ pieces in hand: –

The variation is said to have originated with a blind shōgi player named Kengyo Ishida in the early Edo period. Although records of Ishida's actual games still exist, all of them end in Ishida's loss. An extant game record of a Double Ranging Rook game in 1649 featuring an Ishida position played by Kengyo Ishida is shown in the diagram.

A renaissance of the Ishida variation occurred in the 1970s through the development of an original strategy by the well-known shōgi master Kōzō Masuda, in what is now called Masuda's Ishida (升田式石田流 Masuda-shiki Ishida-ryū). Further developments occurred in the 2000s with professional player Daisuke Suzuki creating the New Quick Ishida variation in 2004, Kenji Imaizumi developing the 1... R-32 opening in 2007, and Toshiaki Kubo adding new moves in 2008. These strategies have attracted renewed interest among professional players since 2011.

== Development ==
Real Ishida formation
☖ pieces in hand: –

9	8	7	6	5	4	3	2	1
									1
									2
									3
									4
		歩							5
歩		飛	歩						6
角	歩	桂							7
									8
									9

☗ pieces in hand: –

The Ishida variation of Third File Rook uses a particular piece formation not found in other Third File Rook openings. In this structure, an early bishop exchange is prevented. It is therefore known as a slow game (持久戦 jikyūsen).

This contrasts with the Quick Ishida (haya ishida) where the possibility of a bishop exchange remains throughout the opening – a rapid attack game (急戦 kyūsen). When referring specifically to the slow Ishida variant, the term 石田流本組 ishida-ryū hongumi is used in Japanese, which is translated as Real Ishida by Fairbairn and Ishida Plenary Formation by Kawasaki (Kitao 2011). Hosking refers to this simply as the Ishida, while the fast game is called the Ishida Quick Attack.

With the rook at 76 (or at 34 for White), the knight will be placed behind the rook to help build up the position. The bishop usually moves to the edge from its starting position, as shown in the diagram, while the left silver is often brought to the center.

Said to be the ideal formation for Ranging Rook, it appears also in cases where the rook does not move to the third file from the start (as in Fourth File Rook or Twisting Rook). The Ishida Opening is also considered the ideal formation in a game with a Lance handicap.

The Ishida is also popular as a potent countermeasure against Static Rook Anaguma due to the versatility of its attack, with the left gold moving to 78 to improve the build up and to reinforce the weak points created by attacking from the seventh file.

Ishida vs Static Rook Anaguma
☖ pieces in hand: –

9	8	7	6	5	4	3	2	1
香	桂				金	金	桂	王	1
			銀				銀	香	2
		歩	歩		歩	角	歩	歩	3
歩	飛	歩		歩		歩			4
	歩								5
		飛	歩	歩					6
歩	歩	桂	銀	角	歩	歩	歩	歩	7
		金				銀	玉		8
香					金		桂	香	9

☗ pieces in hand: –
Ishida vs Static Rook Anaguma
☖ pieces in hand: –

9	8	7	6	5	4	3	2	1
香	桂		金		金		桂	王	1
	飛						銀	香	2
		歩	歩	銀	歩	角	歩	歩	3
歩				歩		歩			4
	歩	歩							5
		飛	歩						6
歩	歩	桂	銀	歩	歩	歩	歩	歩	7
			角			銀	玉		8
香			金		金		桂	香	9

☗ pieces in hand: –
Ishida, B68 variation

== See also ==
- Quick Ishida
- Third File Rook
- Ranging Rook

== Bibliography ==
- Fairbairn, John (1986). Shogi for beginners (2nd ed.). Ishi Press. ISBN 978-4-8718-720-10.
- Hosking, Tony (1996). The art of shogi. The Shogi Foundation. ISBN 978-0-95310-890-9.
- Kitao, Madoka (2011). Joseki at a glance. Translated by Kawasaki, Tomohide. Nekomado. ISBN 978-4-9052-2501-0.
- Kitao, Madoka (2013). Sabaki at a glance. Translated by Kawasaki, Tomohide. Nekomado. ISBN 978-4-9052-2510-2.
- 勝又清和 (2003). 消えた戦法の謎 (文庫版 ed.). 毎日コミュニケーションズ. ISBN 4-8399-1091-X. - 1995年のものの加筆・文庫版
- 久保利明 (2011). 久保の石田流. 日本将棋連盟. ISBN 978-4-8399-3725-6.
- 森下卓 (1997). 将棋基本戦法 振り飛車編. 日本将棋連盟. ISBN 4-8197-0334-X.
- 鈴木大介 (2011). 勝てる石田流. 創元社. ISBN 978-4-422-75133-7.
- 小倉久史 (2006). 下町流三間飛車 居飛穴攻略の新研究. 毎日コミュニケーションズ. ISBN 4-8399-2052-4.
