= Konan University =

University in Kobe, Japan

- 甲南大学
- Type: Private
- Established: 1919 (as Konan Gakuen Middle School); 1951 (Konan University opens)
- Students: 8,889
- Location: Kobe, Japan; 34°43′47.05″N 135°16′4.79″E
- Campus: Urban
- Website: www.konan-u.ac.jp (English)

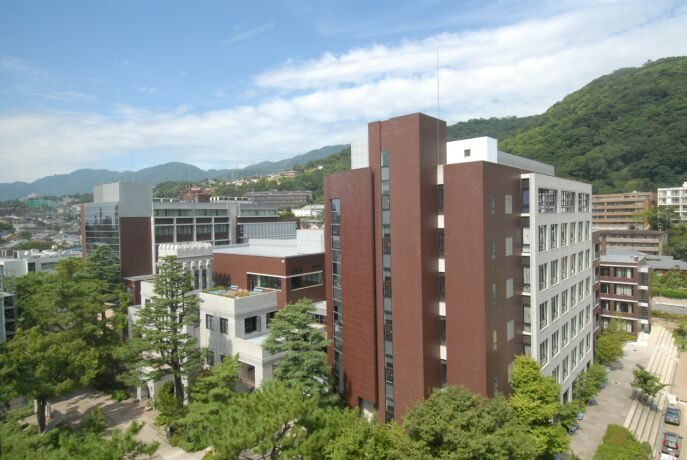
Konan University

Konan University (甲南大学, Kōnan Daigaku) is a university on the slopes of Mount Rokkō in Higashinada-ku, Kobe, Japan. It was founded by business tycoons of major companies for their children. A private university with approximately 10,000 students, it offers a wide variety of programs to Japanese students, as well as an international exchange program through the Konan International Exchange Center.

Of Konan University's graduates, 2,536 are active as presidents (as of 2019), which, given the size of the university, is one of the highest rates of becoming CEOs among universities in the country.

== History ==
Konan University was founded in 1951. The university traces its origin to 1919 when Konan Gakuen School was founded in Okamoto, Kobe, Japan. One of the founders is Hachisaburō Hirao, 45th Minister of Education in the days of Meiji Constitution, former senior managing director of Tokio Marine Insurance, and founder of Konan Hospital (See also List of Japanese politicians). The formation of the school is based on the ideals of character building (personality development), physical fitness, and respect for the individual. Konan University offers undergraduate and graduate programs (Master's and Ph.D.). All programs are accredited by Japan's Ministry of Education, Culture, Sports, Science and Technology.

== Campus ==
Konan University has three campuses in Hyogo prefecture, Japan: Okamoto Campus (the main campus), Nishinomiya Campus (Hirao School of Management), and the Port Island Campus (Science, Medicine & Engineering Research). Okamoto Campus is on the eastern edge of Kobe City in Okamoto, a renowned residential area between Osaka and Kobe.

== Undergraduate education ==
Seven faculties and one school provide undergraduate education.

- Faculty of Letters (similar to a Faculty of Arts and Social Sciences in North American universities)
- Faculty of Science and Engineering
- Faculty of Economics
- Faculty of Law
- Faculty of Business Administration
- Faculty of Intelligence and Informatics
- Faculty of Frontiers of Innovative Research in Science and Technology
- Hirao School of Management

== Graduate education ==
Graduate education is provided by five schools.

- Graduate School of Humanities (Japanese Literature and Language, Applied Sociology, Human Sciences)
- Graduate School of Natural Science (Physics, Chemistry, Biology, Information Science and Systems Engineering)
- Graduate School of Social Science (Economics, Management)
- Graduate School of Law
- Graduate School of Accounting

== Notable alumni ==
- Shin Ashida（Founder and CEO, JCR Pharma）
- Eikichi Ito（Chairman, Itochu Corporation, Later graduated from Cambridge University in UK）
- Norio Ichikawa（CEO, Zojirushi Corporation）
- Toshimasa Iue (Former CEO, Sanyo Electronics, Later graduated from Boston University MBA)
- Kazuyasu Ueshima (Former CEO, UCC UESHIMA COFFEE CO., LTD., Later graduated from Buckingham University)
- Tatsushi Ueshima (Former CEO, UCC UESHIMA COFFEE CO., LTD.)
- Gota Ueshima (CEO, UCC Capital Co., Ltd.)
- Eisuke Ueyama (Dainihon Jochugiku Company, Limited, aka "Kincho"）
- Hiroaki Otani（CEO, YKK Corporation）
- Yoshiro Obayashi（CEO, OBAYASHI CORPORATION）
- Reiko Okutani（Founder and CEO, The R Co., Ltd.）
- Michikatsu Ochi（Founder and Chairman, en Japan Inc.）
- Genichi Kawakami（Former CEO of Yamaha Corporation, Founder of Yamaha Motor Co., Ltd.）
- Hajime Kawagoe（Former CEO, Royal Hotel)
- Hidekuni Kuroda（CEO, KOKUYO CO., LTD., Later graduated from Lewis & Clark College）
- Ryuhei Sadoshima（CEO, Safie, Inc.）
- Motozo Shiono (CEO, SHIONOGI & CO., LTD. Vice chairman of The Federation of Pharmaceutical Manufacturers' Associations of JAPAN）
- Keizo Sekiguchi（Dentist, Chairman of Saitama Dental Association）
- Daisuke Sekine（Founder and CEO, Open Door, Inc.）
- Shunichi Takahata（CEO, Takahata Electric）
- Kunio Takeda（Chairman and CEO, Takeda Pharmaceutical Company Limited. Vice Chairman of Japan Business Federation）
- Toichi Takenaka（Chairman, TAKENAKA CORPORATION. Later graduated from Michigan State University MBA）
- Renichi Takenaka（Former Chairman, TAKENAKA CORPORATION. Later graduated from Waseda University）
- Hitoshi Tada（Chairman, Nomura Securities Co., Ltd.）
- Shingo Torii（Vice Chairman, Santory Holdings Limited）
- Norio Nishikawa（Chairman, Mitsuboshi Belting Ltd.）
- Kazuhiro Chuzawa（Board member, Sapporo Breweries Limited.）
- Saburo Hirao（Vice President, TOYOBO CO., LTD. Later graduated from Kyoto University）
- Kenji Fukuoka（CEO, Swift Xi Inc., Vice president of Kobe Institute of Computing; Graduate School of Information Technology）
- Atsushi Horiba（CEO, HORIBA, Ltd.）
- Masao Horiba (Chairman, HORIBA, Ltd.）
- Mitsuru Honma（CEO and Chairma, Japan Display Inc.）
- Isao Matsuoka（Chairman, TOHO CO., LTD）
- Masato Mizuno（Former Chairman, Mizuno Corporation, Vice president of Japan Olympic committee）
- Yasushi Morishita（CEO, Morishita Jintan Co., Ltd.）
- Sachiko Yuki (Former CEO, Kiccho)
- Toshiaki Yoshino（CEO, ROHTO Pharmaceutical Co., Ltd.）
- Ichiji Ishii（Member in House of Councillors）
- Hajime Ishii (Member in the House of Representatives)
- Toru Okutani (Member in the House of Representatives, Parliamentary Vice-Minister

for the Environment)

- Yutaka Oda（Mayor, Nagaoka City）
- Hiroyuki Kada (Member in the House of Representatives)
- Yasushi Morishita（Member in House of Councillors）
- Hiro Matsushita - Businessman, former driver in Champ Car series, Chairman of Swift Engineering & Swift Xi
- Tomoki Yokoyama - Professional shogi player
- Mai Mihara - Figure skater
- Shun Okamoto - Professional baseball player for Hiroshima Toyo Carp

== Academic rankings ==
The university ranking of the ratio of "president and chief executive officer of listed company"
| | Ranking |
|---|---|
| all universities in Japan | 20th out of all the 744 universities which existed as of 2006 |
| Source | 2006 Survey by Weekly Diamond 〈ja〉 on the ranking of the universities which produced the high ratio of the graduates who hold the position of "president and chief executive officer of listed company" to all the graduates of each university |

=== Overall rankings ===
- QS University Rankings: Asia 2013: not included
- Webometrics Ranking of World Universities 2014: (World Rank) 2,574; (Country Rank) 134
- Webometrics Ranking of World Universities, July 2012: (World Rank) 2,553
- Top organizations: Rankings on SSRN (Social Science Research Network):
  - 5th among Business Schools in Japan (①Kobe U., ②Keio U., ③Hitotsubashi U., ④Hosei U., ⑤Konan U.)
  - Konan University - Graduate School of Business and Accounting

== International students ==
Konan offers a program for international students through the Konan International Exchange Center or KIEC. This program runs from September through May for students from North America and Europe, and from January to December for students from Australia and New Zealand. The program, which is usually made up of between 30 and 45 students, includes rigorous language study, Japanese studies classes on topics of Japanese culture, business, and society, and a homestay in which the student lives with a Japanese family. In previous years the homestay was a mandatory part of the program, however, due to increasing numbers of international students in the academic year 2008–2009, a dormitory option was made available for non-Illinois Consortium for International Studies and Programs students.

Konan offers exchange opportunities with the following universities:

- Australia
  - Murdoch University
  - Edith Cowan University
- Canada
  - Carleton University
  - University of Victoria
- China
  - Northwest University
  - Beijing University of Posts and Telecommunications
- France
  - François Rabelais University, Tours
  - Jean Moulin University Lyon 3
- Germany
  - Humboldt-Universität zu Berlin
  - Cologne Business School, Köln
- Korea
  - Hanyang University
- New Zealand
  - University of Waikato
- Taiwan
  - National Taipei University
  - Tunghai University
- United Kingdom
  - Leeds University
- United States of America
  - University of Illinois at Urbana–Champaign
  - University at Buffalo, The State University of New York

In addition, students from the Illinois Consortium are welcome. This includes the University of Hawaii, the University of Arizona, and the University of Pittsburgh.

== Notable faculty ==
- Ueno, Susumu: representative director of the Asia-Pacific Management Accounting Association (APMAA); chief editor of Asia Pacific Management Accounting Journal (APMAJ); the 2014 Japanese Association of Management Accounting Special Award Recipient.

== See also ==
- Lycée Konan: Japanese boarding school in France operated from 1991 to 2013 under the Konan Foundation
