= Halicardia =

Scientific classification
- Domain: Eukaryota
- Kingdom: Animalia
- Phylum: Mollusca
- Class: Bivalvia
- Superorder: Anomalodesmata
- Superfamily: Verticordioidea
- Family: Verticordiidae
- Genus: Halicardia; Dall, 1895

Genus of molluscs

Halicardia Dall, 1895 is a genus of bivalves in the family Verticordiidae.

== Species ==
- Halicardia angulata (Jeffreys, 1882)
- Halicardia carinifera (Locard, 1898)
- Halicardia flexuosa (A. E. Verrill and S. Smith, 1881)
- Halicardia gouldi (Dall, Bartsch and Rehder, 1938)
- Halicardia houbricki (Poutiers & F.R. Bernard, 1995)
- Halicardia maoria (Dell, 1978)
- Halicardia nipponensis (Okutani, 1957)
- Halicardia perplicata (Dall, 1890)
- Halicardia phillippinensis (Poutiers, 1981)
