= Hirotoshi Ueno =

Japanese shogi player (born 2003)

- Native name: 上野裕寿
- Born: May 5, 2003 (age 23)
- Hometown: Kakogawa, Hyōgo, Japan

Career
- Achieved professional status: October 1, 2023 (aged 23)
- Badge number: 340
- Rank: 6-dan
- Teacher: Keita Inoue (9-dan)
- Tournaments won: 2
- Meijin class: C1
- Ryūō class: 6

Websites
- JSA profile page

Hirotoshi Ueno (上野 裕寿, Ueno Hirotoshi; May 5, 2003) is a Japanese professional shogi player ranked 6-dan.

== Early life, amateur shogi and apprentice professional ==
Ueno was born in Kakogawa, Hyōgo on May 5, 2003. He learned how to play shogi from his father at the age of five, and began taking classes taught by shogi professional Keita Inoue at the Kakogawa Shogi Club as a first-grade elementary school student. As a third-grade elementary school student, he won the lower division (Grades 1 to 3) of the 11th All Japan Elementary School Student Kurashiki Ōshō Tournament (August 2012). As a sixth-grade elementary school student, he finished tied for third place in the 40th Elementary School Student Meijin Tournament (April 2015) and was runner up in the 4th J:Com Cup All Japan Kids Tournament (August 2015). The following month, Ueno was accepted into the Japan Shogi Association's (JSA) apprentice school under the sponsorship of Inoue at the rank of 6-kyū.

Ueno obtained full professional status and the corresponding rank of 4-dan in September 2023 after finishing second in the 73rd 3-dan League (April 2023 – September 2023) with a record of 14 wins and 4 losses.

== Shogi professional ==
In October 2023, Ueno defeated Nagisa Fujimoto 2 games to 1 to win 54th Shinjin-Ō tournament. Ueno's win came in only third game since obtaining professional status, making him the fastest ever to win an official tournament since turning professional.

In October 2024, Ueno defeated Reo Okabe 2 games to none to win the 14th Kakogawa Seiryū tournament.

Ueno was one of the five professionals assigned by the JSA to be opponents for women's shogi professional Tomoka Nishiyama during her Professional Admission Test. Ueno faced Nishiyama in Game 3 of her test on November 8, 2024, and won the game in 109 moves.

=== Promotion history ===
The promotion history for Ueno is as follows.

- 3-dan: October 2018
- 4-dan: October 1, 2023
- 5-dan: March 11, 2025
- 6-dan: May 21, 2026

=== Titles and other championships ===
Ueno has yet to appear in a major title match, but he has won two non-title tournaments.

=== Awards and honours ===
In January 2024, Ueno was named an "Ambassador for Tourism" by the Kakogawa City Tourism Association.
