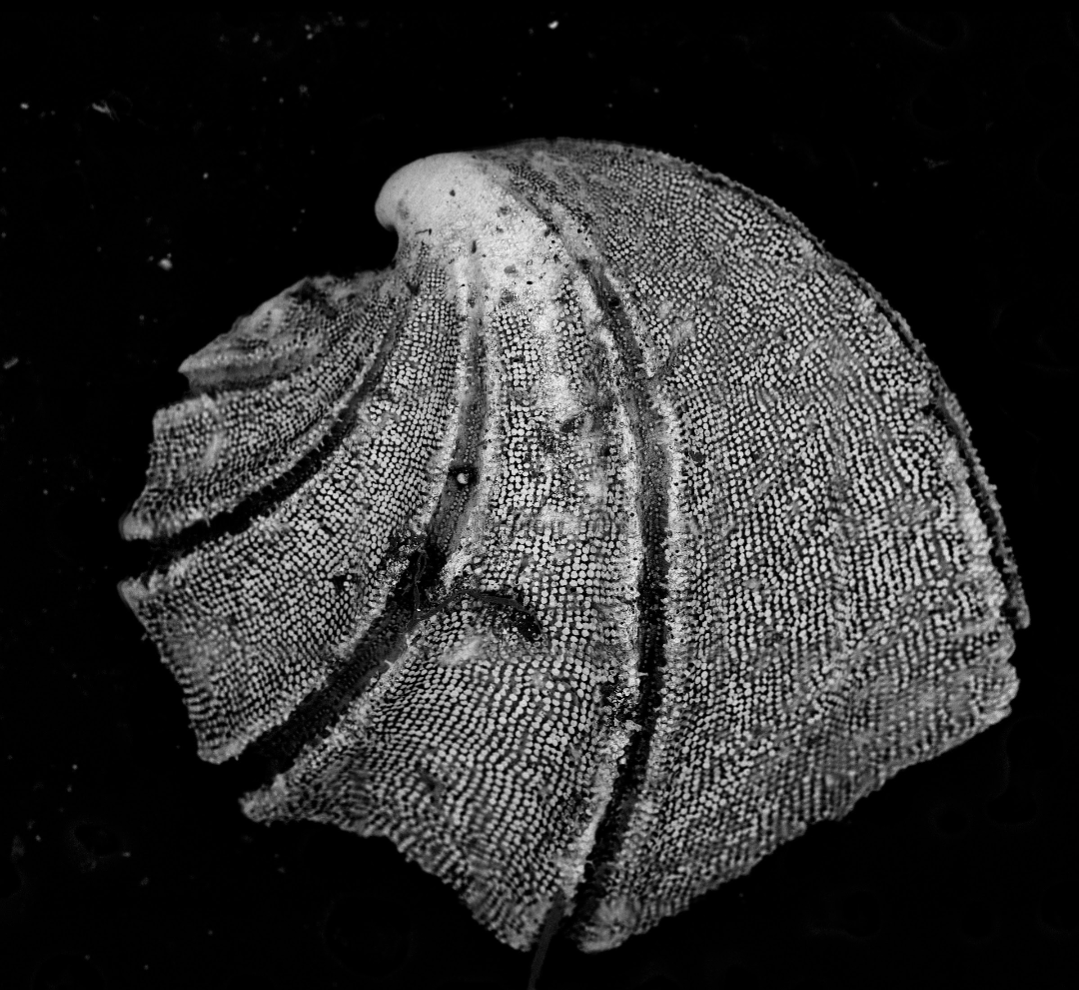
- A specimen of Trigonulina canaliculata

Scientific classification
- Kingdom: Animalia
- Phylum: Mollusca
- Class: Bivalvia
- Family: Verticordiidae
- Genus: Trigonulina
- Species: T. canaliculata

Binomial name
- Trigonulina canaliculata P. Callomon, Tagliaferro & L. D. Campbell, 2023

= Trigonulina canaliculata =

Species of mollusc

Trigonulina canaliculata is a carnivorous bivalve in the family Verticordiidae. It is native to the western Atlantic Ocean near Charleston, South Carolina, USA at depths of at least 200 meters below the surface. It has 5 deep channels or "canals", hence the name "canal-iculata", and has been observed as 1.74-2.75 millimeters in size. The shell experior is a grainy white while the interior is "smooth and nacreous". It has distinct mushroom-shaped pedestals on its shell sculpture which are also present on T. ornata; these are hypothesized to aid these organisms in staying buried in substrate, whether by holding onto grains of sand directly or enhancing the ability for byssal threads to cling to sand.
