= Trigonulina novemcostata =

Scientific classification
- Kingdom: Animalia
- Phylum: Mollusca
- Class: Bivalvia
- Family: Verticordiidae
- Genus: Trigonulina
- Species: T. novemcostata

Binomial name
- Trigonulina novemcostata (A. Adams & Reeve, 1850)

Synonyms
- Hippagus novemcostatus A. Adams & Reeve, 1850; Trigonulina hancocki (F. R. Bernard, 1969); Trigonulina pacifica P. Jung, 1996; Verticordia (Trigonulina) hancocki F. R. Bernard, 1969; Verticordia hancocki F. R. Bernard, 1969; Verticordia novemcostata (A. Adams & Reeve, 1850)

Species of mollusc

Trigonulina novemcostata is a carnivorous bivalve in the family Verticordiidae. It is native to the South China Sea with 7–8 prominent ribs on its surface and ranges from about 0.7-5 millimeters in size in accordance with the unaccepted genus Hippagus it was originally described as. It is the only currently known species in the genus Trigonulina that lives outside of the western Atlantic Ocean, being found in the South China Sea and Pacific Ocean. This species has been observed between California and Peru as well as in Costa Rica. Malacologists currently debate if T. novemcostata is a separate species or a variant of T. ornata due to their similar appearances and habitat overlap.
