= Tateishi Fourth File Rook =

Shogi opening

Tateishi Fourth File Rook
☖ pieces in hand: –

9	8	7	6	5	4	3	2	1
									1
									2
									3
									4
		歩	歩						5
								歩	6
歩	歩			歩	歩	歩	歩		7
	角	金	飛			銀	玉		8
香	桂	銀			金		桂	香	9

☗ pieces in hand: –

Tateishi Fourth File Rook (立石流四間飛車 tateishi-ryū shikenbisha) is a Fourth File Rook strategy that incorporates characteristics of the Ishida (a variation of Third File Rook) opening.

It was named after an amateur player named Tateishi 立石. However, the opening has been used by professional players as well as amateurs. Tateishi received the Special Kōzō Masuda Award in 2004 as a recognition to its development.

Starting from Black's turn, the rook will move to R-68, hence making a Fourth File Rook formation, and then push the vanguard pawn with P-75, and then P-65. From there the rook can move to R-66 and then R-76, so in the end it often settles into an Ishida opening.

From the opening, the major pieces (rook and bishop) can move a lot, but since the bishops can be exchanged at any point, with such a formation the side playing Ishida will end up with golds and silvers being separated. Nevertheless, since often the golds and silvers in the Static Rook side's formation would lean towards one side (particularly when aiming at Static Rook Anaguma), the other side can aim for a rook exchange on the Static Rook's unprepared gaps.

This opening attracted attention as a countermeasure for Static Rook Anaguma, and was played by many Ranging Rook professional players. In particular, shogi player Kenji Kobayashi researched the system as combined with his own "Super Fourth File Rook," in which came to be called "Super Tateishi," and which allowed him to win the Speed Shogi Tournament of 1994.

As a result of the developments in Static Rook countermeasures like moving a gold on the first rank, the Tateishi opening has become progressively rare among professional players.

== Development ==
Tateishi Fourth File
☖ pieces in hand: –

9	8	7	6	5	4	3	2	1
香	桂	銀	金	王	金	銀	桂	香	1
					飛		角		2
歩	歩	歩	歩	歩			歩	歩	3
					歩	歩			4
									5
		歩					歩		6
歩	歩		歩	歩	歩	歩		歩	7
	角				銀		飛		8
香	桂	銀	金	玉	金		桂	香	9

☗ pieces in hand: –
3...R-42

Tateishi Fourth File
☖ pieces in hand: –

9	8	7	6	5	4	3	2	1
香	桂	銀	金		金	銀	桂	香	1
	王				飛		角		2
歩	歩	歩	歩	歩			歩	歩	3
					歩	歩			4
									5
		歩		歩			歩		6
歩	歩		歩		歩	歩		歩	7
	角	玉			銀		飛		8
香	桂	銀	金		金		桂	香	9

☗ pieces in hand: –
4. K-68 K-62

5. K-78 K-72

6. P-56 K-82

Tateishi Fourth File
☖ pieces in hand: –

9	8	7	6	5	4	3	2	1
香	桂		金		金	銀	桂	香	1
	王	銀			飛		角		2
歩	歩	歩	歩	歩			歩	歩	3
					歩	歩			4
									5
		歩		歩			歩		6
歩	歩		歩		歩	歩		歩	7
	角	玉		金	銀		飛		8
香	桂	銀	金				桂	香	9

☗ pieces in hand: –
7. G49-58 S-72
Tateishi Fourth File
☖ pieces in hand: –

9	8	7	6	5	4	3	2	1
香	桂		金		金	銀	桂	香	1
	王	銀			飛		角		2
	歩	歩	歩	歩			歩	歩	3
歩					歩	歩			4
									5
歩		歩		歩			歩		6
	歩		歩		歩	歩		歩	7
	角	玉		金	銀		飛		8
香	桂	銀	金				桂	香	9

☗ pieces in hand: –
8. P-96 P-94

Tateishi Fourth File
☖ pieces in hand: –

9	8	7	6	5	4	3	2	1
香	桂		金		金	銀	桂	香	1
	王	銀			飛		角		2
	歩	歩	歩	歩			歩	歩	3
歩					歩	歩			4
									5
歩	歩	歩		歩			歩		6
			歩		歩	歩		歩	7
	角	玉		金	銀		飛		8
香	桂	銀	金				桂	香	9

☗ pieces in hand: –
9. P-86
Tower Mino castle
☖ pieces in hand: –

9	8	7	6	5	4	3	2	1
									1
									2
									3
									4
									5
歩	歩	歩							6
	玉		歩	歩					7
	角	銀		金					8
香	桂		金						9

☗ pieces in hand: –

Tateishi Fourth File
☖ pieces in hand: –

9	8	7	6	5	4	3	2	1
香	桂		金		金	銀	桂	香	1
	王	銀			飛		角		2
	歩	歩	歩	歩			歩	歩	3
歩						歩			4
					歩				5
歩	歩	歩		歩			歩		6
			歩		歩	歩		歩	7
	角	玉		金	銀		飛		8
香	桂	銀	金				桂	香	9

☗ pieces in hand: –
9...P-45
Tateishi Fourth File
☖ pieces in hand: –

9	8	7	6	5	4	3	2	1
香	桂		金		金	銀	桂	香	1
	王	銀			飛		角		2
	歩	歩	歩	歩			歩	歩	3
歩						歩			4
					歩				5
歩	歩	歩		歩			歩		6
			歩	銀	歩	歩		歩	7
	角	玉		金			飛		8
香	桂	銀	金				桂	香	9

☗ pieces in hand: –
10. S-57

Tateishi Fourth File
☖ pieces in hand: –

9	8	7	6	5	4	3	2	1
香	桂		金		金	銀	桂	香	1
	王	銀			飛		角		2
	歩	歩	歩	歩			歩	歩	3
歩									4
					歩	歩			5
歩	歩	歩		歩			歩		6
			歩	銀	歩	歩		歩	7
	角	玉		金			飛		8
香	桂	銀	金				桂	香	9

☗ pieces in hand: –
10...P-35
Tateishi Fourth File
☖ pieces in hand: –

9	8	7	6	5	4	3	2	1
香	桂		金			銀	桂	香	1
	王	銀			飛	金	角		2
	歩	歩	歩	歩			歩	歩	3
歩									4
					歩	歩	歩		5
歩	歩	歩		歩					6
			歩	銀	歩	歩		歩	7
	角	玉		金			飛		8
香	桂	銀	金				桂	香	9

☗ pieces in hand: –
11. P-26 G-32

Tateishi Fourth File
☖ pieces in hand: –

9	8	7	6	5	4	3	2	1
香	桂		金			銀	桂	香	1
	王	銀			飛	金	角		2
	歩	歩	歩	歩			歩	歩	3
歩									4
				歩	歩	歩	歩		5
歩	歩	歩							6
			歩	銀	歩	歩		歩	7
	角	玉		金			飛		8
香	桂	銀	金				桂	香	9

☗ pieces in hand: –
12. P-55
Tateishi Fourth File
☖ pieces in hand: –

9	8	7	6	5	4	3	2	1
香	桂		金			銀	桂	香	1
	王	銀				金	角		2
	歩	歩	歩	歩			歩	歩	3
歩					飛				4
				歩	歩	歩	歩		5
歩	歩	歩							6
			歩	銀	歩	歩		歩	7
	角	玉		金			飛		8
香	桂	銀	金				桂	香	9

☗ pieces in hand: –
12...R-44

Tateishi Fourth File
☖ pieces in hand: –

9	8	7	6	5	4	3	2	1
香	桂		金			銀	桂	香	1
	王	銀				金	角		2
	歩	歩	歩	歩			歩	歩	3
歩					飛				4
				歩	歩	歩	歩		5
歩	歩	歩		銀					6
			歩		歩	歩		歩	7
	角	玉		金			飛		8
香	桂	銀	金				桂	香	9

☗ pieces in hand: –
13. S-56
Tateishi Fourth File
☖ pieces in hand: –

9	8	7	6	5	4	3	2	1
香	桂		金			銀		香	1
	王	銀				金	角		2
	歩	歩	歩	歩		桂	歩	歩	3
歩					飛				4
				歩	歩	歩	歩		5
歩	歩	歩		銀					6
			歩		歩	歩		歩	7
	角	玉		金			飛		8
香	桂	銀	金				桂	香	9

☗ pieces in hand: –
13...N-33

Tateishi Fourth File
☖ pieces in hand: –

9	8	7	6	5	4	3	2	1
香	桂		金					香	1
	王	銀			銀	金	角		2
	歩	歩	歩	歩		桂	歩	歩	3
歩					飛				4
				歩	歩	歩	歩		5
歩	歩	歩		銀					6
	玉		歩		歩	歩		歩	7
	角			金			飛		8
香	桂	銀	金				桂	香	9

☗ pieces in hand: –
14. K-87 S-42
Tateishi Fourth File
☖ pieces in hand: –

9	8	7	6	5	4	3	2	1
香	桂		金					香	1
	王	銀			銀	金	角		2
	歩	歩	歩	歩		桂	歩	歩	3
歩					飛				4
				歩	歩	歩	歩		5
歩	歩	歩		銀					6
	玉		歩		歩	歩		歩	7
	角	銀		金			飛		8
香	桂		金				桂	香	9

☗ pieces in hand: –
15. S-78

Tateishi Fourth File
☖ pieces in hand: –

9	8	7	6	5	4	3	2	1
香	桂		金					香	1
	王	銀				金	角		2
	歩	歩	歩	歩	銀	桂	歩	歩	3
歩					飛				4
				歩	歩	歩	歩		5
歩	歩	歩		銀					6
	玉		歩		歩	歩		歩	7
	角	銀		金			飛		8
香	桂		金				桂	香	9

☗ pieces in hand: –
15...S-43

Tateishi Fourth File
☖ pieces in hand: –

9	8	7	6	5	4	3	2	1
香	桂		金			角		香	1
	王	銀				金			2
	歩	歩	歩	歩	銀	桂	歩	歩	3
歩					飛				4
			歩	歩	歩	歩	歩		5
歩	歩	歩		銀					6
	玉				歩	歩		歩	7
	角	銀		金			飛		8
香	桂		金				桂	香	9

☗ pieces in hand: –
16. P-66 B-31
17. P-65

== Bibliography ==
- 将棋世界編集部 (2016). 立石流四間飛車. マイナビ出版.
