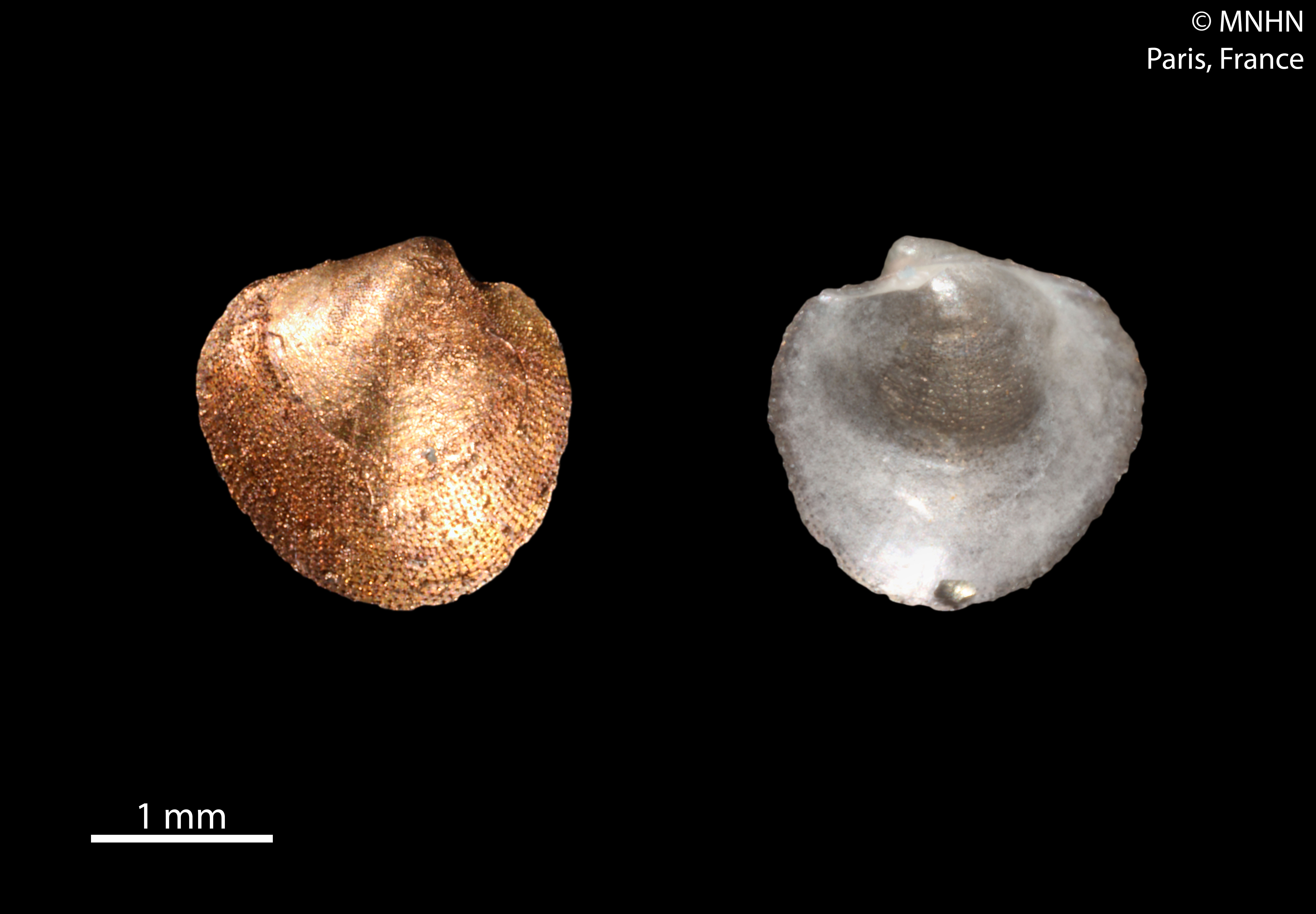
- Verticordia ouricuri

Scientific classification
- Kingdom: Animalia
- Phylum: Mollusca
- Class: Bivalvia
- Superorder: Anomalodesmata
- Superfamily: Verticordioidea
- Family: Verticordiidae; Stoliczka, 1871

= Verticordiidae =

Family of bivalves

Verticordiidae is a family of benthic marine bivalves in the superorder Anomalodesmata. These clams range from 2 - 200 millimeters in length and are mainly found in coastal waters surrounding Australia and the Americas, though a few species within this family such as Haliris mediopacifica are found in the middle of the ocean. Verticordiidae is known for being a family of septibranchs, or predatory bivalves, rather than filter feeders. Clams dig vertical burrows in substrate and use papillae around the edges of their inhalant siphons to detect microscopic prey. Some clams in this family, specifically in the genus Trigonulina, have distinct extended circular formations on their shells.

== Genera and species ==
Genera and species within the family Verticordiidae include:

- Halicardia Dall, 1895
  - Halicardia angulata (Jeffreys, 1882)
  - Halicardia carinifera (Locard, 1898)
  - Halicardia flexuosa (A. E. Verrill and S. Smith, 1881)
  - Halicardia gouldi (Dall, Bartsch and Rehder, 1938)
  - Halicardia houbricki (Poutiers & F.R. Bernard, 1995)
  - Halicardia maoria (Dell, 1978)
  - Halicardia nipponensis (Okutani, 1957)
  - Halicardia perplicata (Dall, 1890)
  - Halicardia phillippinensis (Poutiers, 1981)
- Haliris Dall, 1886
  - Haliris accessa (Iredale, 1930)
  - Haliris aequacostata (A.D. Howard, 1950)
  - Haliris berenicensis (Sturany, 1896)
  - Haliris crebrilirata (Prashad, 1932)
  - Haliris fischeriana (Dall, 1881)
  - Haliris granulata (G. Seguenza, 1860)
  - Haliris jaffaensis (Cotton & Godfrey, 1938)
  - Haliris lamothei (Dautzenberg & H. Fischer, 1897)
  - Haliris makiyamai (Habe, 1952)
  - Haliris mediopacifica (Kosuge, 1979)
  - Haliris multicostata (A. Adams, 1862)
  - Haliris pygmaea (Kuroda, 1952)
  - Haliris setosa (Hedley, 1907)
  - Haliris teporis Poutiers & F.R. Bernard, 1995
  - Haliris trapezoidea (G. Seguenza, 1876)
- Laevicordia G. Sequenza, 1876
  - Laevicordia abscissa (Pelseneer, 1911)
- Simplicicordia Kuroda & Habe, 1971
  - Simplicicordia trigonata (Yokoyama, 1922)
- Spinosipella Iredale, 1930
  - Spinosipella acuticostata (Philippi, 1844)
  - Spinosipella agnes Simone & C. Cunha, 2008
  - Spinosipella costeminens (Poutiers, 1981)
  - Spinosipella deshayesiana (P. Fischer, 1862)
  - Spinosipella tinga Simone & C. Cunha, 2008
  - Spinosipella xui J.-X. Jiang, Y.-Q. Huang, Q.-Y. Liang & J.-L. Zhang, 2019
- Trigonulina d'Orbigny, 1842
  - Trigonulina canaliculata (Callomon, Tagliaferro, Campbell, 2023)
  - Trigonulina novemcostata (A. Adams & Reeve, 1850)
  - Trigonulina ornata (d'Orbigny, 1842)
- Vertambitus Iredale, 1930
  - Vertambitus affinis (Jaeckel & Thiele, 1931)
  - Vertambitus cuneatus (Kuroda, 1952)
  - Vertambitus excoriatus (Poutiers, 1984)
  - Vertambitus torridus (Hedley, 1906)
  - Vertambitus triangularis (Locard, 1898)
  - Vertambitus vadosus (Hedley, 1907)
- Verticordia J. de C. Sowerby, 1844
  - Verticordia australiensis E.A. Smith, 1885
  - Verticordia bordaensis Cotton & Godfrey, 1938
  - Verticordia expansa Prashad, 1932
  - Verticordia granulifera (Verrill, 1885)
  - Verticordia guineensis Thiele, 1931
  - Verticordia inornata Jaeckel & Thiele, 1931
  - Verticordia ouricuri Oliviera & Absalão, 2010
  - Verticordia perversa Dall, 1886
  - Verticordia quadrata E.A. Smith, 1885
  - Verticordia seguenzae Dall, 1886
  - Verticordia tasmanica May, 1915
  - Verticordia tenerrima Jaeckel & Thiele, 1931
  - Verticordia woodii E. A. Smith, 1885
- Vertisphaera Iredale, 1930
  - Vertisphaera cambrica Iredale, 1930
