= R78 =

R78 may refer to:

- 1.R-78 opening, a shogi opening
- HMS Wessex (R78), a destroyer of the Royal Navy
- Régimen del 78, a nickname given to the government of Spain
