= Katsuhiko Murooka =

Japanese shogi player (born 1959)

- Native name: 室岡克彦
- Born: March 21, 1959 (age 67)
- Hometown: Arakawa, Tokyo

Career
- Achieved professional status: December 16, 1981 (aged 22)
- Badge number: 153
- Rank: 8-dan
- Retired: June 18, 2024 (aged 65)
- Teacher: Yūji Sase (Honorary 9-dan)
- Career record: 454–642 (.414)
- Notable students: Ryūma Yoshiike

Websites
- JSA profile page
- Official website

Katsuhiko Murooka (室岡 克彦, Murooka Katsuhiko; born March 21, 1959) is a Japanese retired professional shogi player who achieved the rank of 8-dan.

== Shogi professional ==
In April 2024, the JSA posted on its official website that Murooka had met the requirements for mandatory retirement for "Free Class" players and that his retirement would become official upon completion of his last scheduled official game of his current playing schedule. On June 19, 2024, the JSA announced that Murooka's retirement became official the prior day after his loss to Reo Okabe in a 37th Ryūō Group 6 game. Murooka finished his career with a record of 454 wins and 642 losses for a winning percentage of 0.414.

=== Promotion history ===
Murooka's promotion history is as follows:

- 6-kyū: 1973
- 1-dan: 1977
- 4-dan: December 16, 1981
- 5-dan: April 1, 1985
- 6-dan: May 22, 1989
- 7-dan: May 30, 1997
- 8-dan: April 1, 2023
- Retired: June 18, 2024
