= Shōko Kubo =

Japanese shogi player (born 2006)

- Native name: 久保 翔子
- Born: January 12, 2006 (age 19)
- Hometown: Osaka, Japan

Career
- Achieved professional status: October 1, 2022 (aged 16)
- Badge Number: W-82
- Rank: Women's 1-kyū
- Teacher: Toshiaki Kubo (9-dan)

Websites
- JSA profile page

Shōko Kubo (久保 翔子, Kubo Shōko; born January 12, 2006) is a Japanese women's professional shogi player ranked 1-kyū.

== Early life and becoming a women's professional shogi player ==
Kubo was born in Osaka, Japan on January 12, 2006. Since her father Toshiaki is also a shogi professional, she was exposed to the game from an early age. Under the guidance of her father, she entered the Kansai branch of Japan Shogi Association's training group system in October 2019 when she was a first-year junior high school student. She qualified for women's professional status in September 2022 after being promoted to training group B2.

== Women's shogi professional ==
=== Promotion history ===
Kubo's promotion history is as follows.

- 2-kyū: October 1, 2022
- 1-kyū : July 8, 2024

Note: All ranks are women's professional ranks.
