= Laevicordia =

Scientific classification
- Kingdom: Animalia
- Phylum: Mollusca
- Class: Bivalvia
- Family: Verticordiidae
- Genus: Laevicordia; G. Seguenza, 1876

Synonyms
- Verticordia (Laevicordia) G. Seguenza, 1876

Genus of bivalves

Laevicordia is a genus of small carnivorous bivalves in the family Verticordiidae. It currently contains the single extant species L. abscissa and the fossil species L. orbiculata.
