= Simplicicordia =

Scientific classification
- Kingdom: Animalia
- Phylum: Mollusca
- Class: Bivalvia
- Family: Verticordiidae
- Genus: Simplicicordia; Kuroda & Habe, 1971
- Species: S. trigonata

Binomial name
- Simplicicordia trigonata (Yokoyama, 1922)

Genus of bivalves

Simplicicordia is a genus of small carnivorous bivalves in the family Verticordiidae. It contains the single species S. trigonata.
