= Haliris =

Scientific classification
- Kingdom: Animalia
- Phylum: Mollusca
- Class: Bivalvia
- Superorder: Anomalodesmata
- Superfamily: Verticordioidea
- Family: Verticordiidae
- Genus: Haliris; Dall, 1886

Genus of bivalves

Haliris is a genus of the class Bivalvia of the family Verticordiidae.

== Species ==
- Haliris accessa (Iredale, 1930)
- Haliris aequacostata (A.D. Howard, 1950)
- Haliris berenicensis (Sturany, 1896)
- Haliris crebrilirata (Prashad, 1932)
- Haliris fischeriana (Dall, 1881)
- Haliris granulata (G. Seguenza, 1860)
- Haliris jaffaensis (Cotton & Godfrey, 1938)
- Haliris lamothei (Dautzenberg & H. Fischer, 1897)
- Haliris makiyamai (Habe, 1952)
- Haliris mediopacifica (Kosuge, 1979)
- Haliris multicostata (A. Adams, 1862)
- Haliris pygmaea (Kuroda, 1952)
- Haliris setosa (Hedley, 1907)
- Haliris teporis Poutiers & F.R. Bernard, 1995
- Haliris trapezoidea (G. Seguenza, 1876)
