= Vertisphaera =

Scientific classification
- Kingdom: Animalia
- Phylum: Mollusca
- Class: Bivalvia
- Family: Verticordiidae
- Genus: Vertisphaera; Iredale 1930
- Species: V. cambrica

Binomial name
- Vertisphaera cambrica Iredale 1930

Genus of molluscs

Vertisphaera is a genus of small carnivorous bivalves in the family Verticordiidae. It contains the single species V. cambrica. Vertisphaera was named in 1930 by Iredale, who differentiated it from Verticordia.
