= Trigonulina =

Scientific classification
- Kingdom: Animalia
- Phylum: Mollusca
- Class: Bivalvia
- Family: Verticordiidae
- Genus: Trigonulina d'Orbigny, 1853

Synonyms
- Verticordia (Trigonulina) d'Orbigny, 1853

Genus of molluscs

Trigonulina is a genus of small carnivorous bivalves in the family Verticordiidae. It was first named by Alcide d'Orbigny with the type taxon T. ornata in 1853, though T. novemcostata was named first originally as Hippagus novemcostatus in 1850 which is now unaccepted. Trigonulina shells are known to be extremely small, ranging from about 1-3.6 millimeters long. They live at depths of 18-850 meters below the ocean's surface and burrow under sand to feed on microscopic crustaceans using adapted inhalant siphons. T. canaliculata and T. ornata live in the western Atlantic Ocean while T. novemcostata is native to the South China Sea.

== Species ==
- Trigonulina canaliculata (P. Callomon, T. Tagliaferro, L.D. Campbell, 2023)
- Trigonulina novemcostata (A. Adams & Reeve, 1850)
- Trigonulina ornata (d'Orbigny, 1853)
