= Kanta Masegi =

Japanese shogi player

- Native name: 柵木幹太
- Born: February 18, 1998 (age 28)
- Hometown: Nishio, Aichi, Japan

Career
- Achieved professional status: April 1, 2023 (aged 25)
- Badge number: 338
- Rank: 5-dan
- Teacher: Yūji Masuda (7-dan)
- Meijin class: C2
- Ryūō class: 5

Websites
- JSA profile page

Kanta Masegi (柵木 幹太, Masegi Kanta; February 18, 1998) is a Japanese professional shogi player ranked 5-dan.

== Early life and amateur shogi ==
Masegi was born in Nishio, Aichi Prefecture on February 18, 1998. He learned how to play shogi from his father.

Masegi entered the Japan Shogi Association (JSA) apprentice professional school at the rank of 6-kyū in September 2009 as a student of shogi professional Yūji Masuda. He was promoted to the rank of apprentice professional 3-dan in April 2016 and qualified to play in the JSA's 59th 3-dan League (April–September 2016); Masegi's first season in the 3-dan League, however, did not go well as he finished dead last out of 29 players with a record of 4 wins and 14 losses. Masegi finished the 69th 3-dan League (April–September 2021) in third place with a record of 13 wins and 5 losses to earn a promotion point towards regular professional status. (Note: The first and second place finishers of the 69th 3-dan League also finished with a record of 13 wins and 5 losses but were awarded regular professional status due to being higher seeded.) Masegi earned a second promotion point after finishing 3rd in the 72nd 3-dan League (October 2022 – March 2023) with a record of 13 wins and 5 losses to earn a second promotion point; (Note: As before, Masegi finished league play with the same record as the first and second place finishers but did not qualify for automatic promotion due to his lower seed.) this gave him the option to enter the professional ranks as a Free Class player which he elected to do.

== Shogi professional ==
Masegi was one of the five most recently promoted regular professionals selected to be the for women's professional shogi player Tomoka Nishiyama during her best-of-five Professional Admission Test. Masegi was Nishiyama's opponent in Game 5 of the test played on January 22, 2025, at the JSA's Kansai Branch office. A win by Nishiyama would mean that she would become the first woman to be awarded regular professional status by the JSA, but Masegi won the game in 135 moves. Masegi and Nishiyama faced each five times in apprentice professional 3-dan League play, with Masegi winning each game; however, Masegi reviewed the game scores from those games as part of his preparation and found that he had gotten a bit lucky and could have easily lost each game. He was impressed by how strong Nishiyama was in fighting back from disadvantageous positions. At the post-game press conference, Masegi stated he felt some pressure and was nervous before the game started but settled down once the game began. He also stated that moving first allowed him to steer the game into a long drawn out positional battle as he had planned, allowing to him to obtain an advantageous position in the early part of the game; however, he then made some bad moves and ended up in an endgame where both sides had chances to win. Masegi told the Asahi Shimbun in January 2026 (almost a year after the game) that defeating Nishiyama in such an important game completely changed things for him as a shogi professional, and he began to play much better and achieve better results. (Note: Masegi had a winning percentage or around 0.500 prior to the Nishiyama game, but he had improved it to 0.735 by the time of the January 2026 Asahi Shimbun article. By the end of July 2026, his winning percentage had improved to 0.769 (50 wins and 15 losses) since beating Nishiyama.)

Masegi was promoted to Class C2 of the Meijin Ranking League from the Free Class for the 85th Meijin League (April 2026 – March 2027) in April 2025 after defeating Yoshikazu Minami in a 38th Ryūō Tournament Class 6 game. The win allowed Masegi to meet the criteria for promotion from the Free Class by posting a winning percentage of 0.650 or greater over a span of 30 games. Masegi's win over Minami was his twentieth win over a span of 30 games and gave him a winning percentage of 0.667.

In October 2025, Masegi advanced to the finals of the 15th Kakogawa Seiryū Tournament against Ryūma Yoshiike but lost the best-of-three championship match 2 games to 1.

In July 2026, Masegi defeated Takuya Nagase in the semi-finals of the 39th Ryūō Challenger Determination Tournament to advance the best-of-three final round against Shin'ichirō Hattori with the winner becoming the challenger to the reigning Ryūō Sōta Fujii. Game 1 was played on August 4, 2026, at the JSA's Kansai Branch Office; Masegi won the game in 71 moves. Hattori tied the match by winning Game 2 held at the JSA headquarters in Tokyo on August 13, 2026; Game 2 was actually two games: the "first" game, with Hattori as sente, ended in sennichite after 98 moves, and Hattori won the replay-game (with sente/gote reversed) in 113 moves. Game 3 played on August 24, 2026, at the JSA Headquarters in Tokyo was won by Hattori in 129 moves, and the loss meant that Masegi not only failed to qualify as the 39th Ryūō challenger but also missed out on being "leapfrog" promoted from 5-dan to 7-dan since challengers for the Ryūō title satisfy the criteria for immediate promotion to the rank of 7-dan. (Note: Had Masegi won the game and become the Ryūō challenger, he would have earned immediate promotion to the rank of 7-dan from 5-dan, thus "leapfrogging" over the rank of 6-dan. He would have been the first shogi professional to achieve such a feat since the JSA established its new promotion criteria in 2005.)

=== Promotion history ===
The promotion history for Masegi is as follows.

- 6-kyū: September 2009
- 3-dan: April 2016
- 4-dan: April 1, 2023
- 5-dan: May 20, 2026

=== Playing style ===
In the 39th Ryūō Tournament player profile of Masegi on its official website, The Yomiuri Shimbun, the main sponsor of the Ryūō Tournament, describes Masegi as having mastered a wide-range of opening strategies and possessing a deep knowledge of the opening. It also calls him a fighter-type of professional who plays with lots of intensity and plays boldly in the endgame.

=== Awards and honors ===
Masegi's first book published as a shogi professional, Gendai Aiibisha no Kōzō (｢現代相居飛車の構造｣, Modern Symmetrical Static Rook Structures; Mynavi Publishing November 2024), won the 37th Shōgi Pen Club Award for technical writing in July 2025.

== Personal life ==
Masegi graduated from Nagoya University's School of Engineering. He subsequently enrolled in Nagoya University's Graduate School of Engineering but decided to leave school before finishing his degree to focus on becoming a shogi professional. He is the first professional shogi player to graduate from the university.
