= Ryūma Yoshiike =

Japanese shogi player

- Native name: 吉池隆真
- Born: November 8, 2004 (age 21)
- Hometown: Arakawa, Tokyo, Japan

Career
- Achieved professional status: October 1, 2024 (aged 19)
- Badge number: 344
- Rank: 4-dan
- Teacher: Katsuhiko Murooka (8-dan)
- Tournaments won: 1
- Meijin class: C2
- Ryūō class: 6

Websites
- JSA profile page

Ryūma Yoshiike (吉池 隆真, Yoshiike Ryūma; November 8, 2004) is a Japanese professional shogi player ranked 4-dan.

== Early life and amateur shogi ==
Yoshiike was born in Arakawa, Tokyo, on November 8, 2004. Yoshiike learned how to play shogi from a friend when he was an elementary school first grade student, and subsequently started attending a shogi school in Arakawa run by shogi professional Katsuhiko Murooka. Yoshiike entered the Japan Shogi Association's apprentice school at the rank of 6-kyū as a student of Murooka in September 2015 and was promoted to the rank of apprentice professional 3-dan in October 2021. He obtained regular professional status and the rank of 4-dan in October 2024 after finishing second in the 75th 3-dan League (April–October 2024) with a record of 14 wins and 4 losses.

== Shogi professional ==
In October 2025, Yoshiike defeated Kanta Masegi 2 games to 1 to win the 15th Kakogawa Seiryū tournament. This was the second appearance for Yoshiike in Kakogawa Seiryū tournament finals: he lost to Nagisa Fujimoto 2 games to none two years earlier in the finals of the 13th Kakogawa Seiryū tournament when he was still an apprentice professional 3-dan.

=== Promotion history ===
The promotion history for Yoshiike is as follows.

- 6-kyū: September 2015
- 3-dan: October 2021
- 4-dan: October 1, 2024

=== Titles and other championships ===
Yoshiike has yet to appear in a major title match, but he has won one non-title tournament.
