= Nana Sakaki =

Japanese shogi player (born 2003)

- Native name: 榊 菜吟
- Born: November 12, 2003 (age 21)
- Hometown: Osaka, Japan

Career
- Achieved professional status: May 1, 2022 (aged 18)
- Badge Number: W-77
- Rank: Women's 2-kyū
- Teacher: Toshiaki Kubo (9-dan)

Websites
- JSA profile page

Nana Sakaki (榊 菜吟, Sakaki Nana; born November 12, 2003) is a Japanese women's professional shogi player ranked 2-kyū.

== Early life and becoming a women's professional shogi player ==
Sakaki was born in Osaka on November 12, 2003. She learned how to play shogi as elementary school student when a friend asked her to play. Under the guidance of shogi professional Toshiaki Kubo, she entered the Kansai branch of the Japan Shogi Association's training group system and subsequently qualified for women's professional status after being promoted to training group B2 in April 2022.

== Women's shogi professional ==
=== Promotion history ===
Sakaki's promotion history is as follows.

- 2-kyū: May 1, 2022

Note: All ranks are women's professional ranks.
