= Spinosipella =

Scientific classification
- Kingdom: Animalia
- Phylum: Mollusca
- Class: Bivalvia
- Family: Verticordiidae
- Genus: Spinosipella; Iredale, 1930

Genus of bivalves

Spinosipella is a genus of small carnivorous bivalves in the family Verticordiidae.

== Species ==
- Spinosipella acuticostata (Philippi, 1844)
- Spinosipella agnes Simone & C. Cunha, 2008
- Spinosipella costeminens (Poutiers, 1981)
- Spinosipella deshayesiana (P. Fischer, 1862)
- Spinosipella tinga Simone & C. Cunha, 2008
- Spinosipella xui J.-X. Jiang, Y.-Q. Huang, Q.-Y. Liang & J.-L. Zhang, 2019
