= Nanami Naka =

Japanese shogi player (born 1998)

- Native name: 中七海
- Born: August 7, 1998 (age 28)
- Hometown: Kobe, Japan

Career
- Achieved professional status: November 1, 2024 (aged 26)
- Badge number: W-91
- Rank: Women's 3-dan
- Teacher: Keita Inoue (9-dan)

Websites
- JSA profile page

Nanami Naka (中 七海, Naka Nanami; born August 7, 1998) is a Japanese women's professional shogi player ranked 3-dan.

== Early life, amateur shogi and apprentice professional ==
Naka was born on August 7. 1998, in Kobe, Japan. She learned how to play shogi from her older brother when she was a first-grade elementary school student. While in elementary school, Naka was Hyōgo Prefecture's representative in several national elementary school tournaments for girls, and won the All-Japan Elementary Student Girl's Meijin Tournament in 2008 as a fourth-grade student and in 2009 as a fifth-grade student. She also represented Hyōgo Prefecture in the Elementary School Student Meijin Tournament (for boys and girls) in 2008 (33rd Elementary School Student Meijin Tournament), 2009 (34th Elementary School Student Meijin Tournament) and 2010 (35th Elementary School Student Meijin Tournament), finishing tied for third in the 2010 tournament after losing to future professional shogi player Taiki Yamakawa in the tournament's semi-finals.

Naka entered the JSA's apprentice professional school in September 2011 at the rank of apprentice professional 6-kyū as a first-year junior high school student under the mentorship of shogi professional Keita Inoue. She was promoted to apprentice professional 1-dan in 2018, and apprentice professional 2-dan in February 2020. In September 2020, Naka become the third female overall and the first in five years to be promoted to apprentice professional 3-dan. (Note: Kana Fukuma was promoted to apprentice professional 3-dan in December 2013 and Tomoka Nishiyama was promoted to apprentice professional 3-dan in December 2015.) Naka participated in the JSA's apprentice professional 3-dan League for eight seasons from the 68th 3-dan League (October 2020 – March 2021) until the 75th 3-dan League (April 2024 – September 2024), but was required to leave the apprentice school after turning 26 years old due to apprentice professional school age requirements. (Note: Apprentice professionals who reach the rank of 3-dan are required to obtain promotion to full-professional status before turning 26 years old per JSA rules. Those who turn 26 years old during 3-dan League play are allowed to finish out the league, but must finish with a winning record in order to be eligible to continue playing in the next scheduled league season. Naka turned 26 years old during the 75th 3-dan League but finished league play with a record of 8 wins and 10 losses; so, she was required to leave the apprentice professional school.)

Female apprentice professionals ranked 2-kyū or higher who leave the apprentice professional school but otherwise satisfy the criteria for women's professional status are given two weeks to notify the JSA of their intention to become a women's professional. On October 4, 2024, the JSA posted on its official website that Naka had made such a request, and that it had been approved. The JSA also posted that Naka would be awarded the rank of women's professional 3-dan in accordance with its rules regarding such matters since that was the highest rank she achieved as an apprentice professional, and also that her change in status would become official on November 1, 2024.

== Women's shogi professional ==
Naka's debut game as a women's professional came on December 19, 2024, when she faced Saki Kawamata in a Women's Meijin league preliminary round game; Naka won the game in 92 moves. Naka won her next five games before losing to Yui Isoya in the semi-finals of a 52nd Women's Meijin preliminary block tournament on February 19, 2025.

On September 13, 2025, Naka defeated women's professional 6-crown title holder Kana Fukuma in the finals of the challenger determination round for the 47th Women's Ōshō tournament to advance to a major title match for the first time. (Note: The game between Naka and Fukuma was actually played on August 12, 2025; the Women's Osho challenger determination round games, however, are recorded for later broadcast on the Igo & Shogi Channel, and the results are not made public until after a game has been broadcast.) In the best-of-three 47th Women's Ōshō title match (October 2025) against Tomoka Nishiyama, Naka won the first game but lost the next two to lose the match 2 games to 1.

For the second year in a row, Naka won the Women's Ōshō challenger tournament to advance to the main title against Nishiyama. Like the year before, Naka won Game 1 of the match, but once again lost the next two games to lose the 48th Women's Ōshō title match (October 2026) 2 games to 1.

=== Playing style ===
Naka has stated she does not really have a favorite shogi opening, but her mentor Inoue has described her as having an attacking-style and being an "all-rounder" who is proficient in both Ranging Rook and Static Rook openings.

=== Promotion history ===
The promotion history for Naka is given below.

- 3-dan: November 1, 2024

Note: All ranks are women's professional ranks.

=== Titles and other championships ===
Naka has appeared in a women's professional shogi major title match twice but has yet to win a major title.
