= Hisashi Ogura =

Japanese shogi player (born 1968)

- Native name: 小倉久史
- Born: May 15, 1968 (age 58)
- Hometown: Tokyo Metropolis

Career
- Achieved professional status: October 1, 1988 (aged 20)
- Badge number: 188
- Rank: 8-dan
- Retired: April 30, 2026 (aged 60)
- Teacher: Makoto Nakahara (9-dan)
- Career record: 570–565 (.502)
- Notable students: Hiroshi Yamamoto; Yūto Kawamura

Websites
- JSA profile page

Hisashi Ogura (小倉 久史, Ogura Hisashi; born May 15, 1968) is a Japanese retired professional shogi player who achieved the rank of 8-dan.

== Shogi professional ==
On April 1, 2026, the JSA announced Ogura had met the conditions for mandatory retirement for "Free Class" players and his retirement would become official upon completion of his final scheduled game of the 2026–2027 shogi season. Ogawa's retirement became official upon losing to Masakazu Kondō on April 30, 2026, in a 39th Ryūō Group 6 game. He finished his career with a record of 570 wins and 565 losses for a winning percentage of 0.502.

=== Promotion history ===
The promotion history for Ogura is as follows:

- 6-kyū: 1982
- 1-dan: 1986
- 4-dan: October 1, 1988
- 5-dan: October 28, 1992
- 6-dan: May 20, 1998
- 7-dan: October 24, 2005
- 8-dan: April 1, 2022
- Retired: April 30, 2026
