= Aya Uchiyama =

Japanese shogi player (born 2004)

- Native name: 内山 あや
- Born: May 22, 2004 (age 21)
- Hometown: Belfast, Northern Ireland, United Kingdom

Career
- Achieved professional status: December 1, 2020 (aged 16)
- Badge Number: W-71
- Rank: Women's 1-dan
- Teacher: Tadao Kitajima (7-dan)

Websites
- JSA profile page

Aya Uchiyama (内山 あや, Uchiyama Aya; born May 22, 2004) is a Japanese women's professional shogi player ranked 1-dan.

== Early life and amateur shogi ==
As a junior high school seventh-grade student in 2017, Ushiyama finished third in the 42nd Junior High School Student Meijin Tournament. Two years later in October 2019, she finished fourth in the 51st Women's Amateur Meijin Tournament, losing in the semi-finals to Miran Nohara.

== Women's shogi professional ==
=== Promotion history ===
Uchiyama's promotion history is as follows:

- 2-kyū: December 1, 2020
- 1-kyū: April 1, 2022
- 1-dan: March 9, 2023

Note: All ranks are women's professional ranks.
