= Vertambitus =

Scientific classification
- Kingdom: Animalia
- Phylum: Mollusca
- Class: Bivalvia
- Family: Verticordiidae
- Genus: Vertambitus; Iredale, 1930

Genus of bivalve molluscs

Vertambitus is a genus of the bivalves in the family Verticordiidae.

== Species ==
- Vertambitus affinis (Jaeckel & Thiele, 1931)
- Vertambitus cuneatus (Kuroda, 1952)
- Vertambitus excoriatus (Poutiers, 1984)
- Vertambitus torridus (Hedley, 1906)
- Vertambitus triangularis (Locard, 1898)
- Vertambitus vadosus (Hedley, 1907)
