= Nagisa Fujimoto =

Japanese shogi player (born 2005)

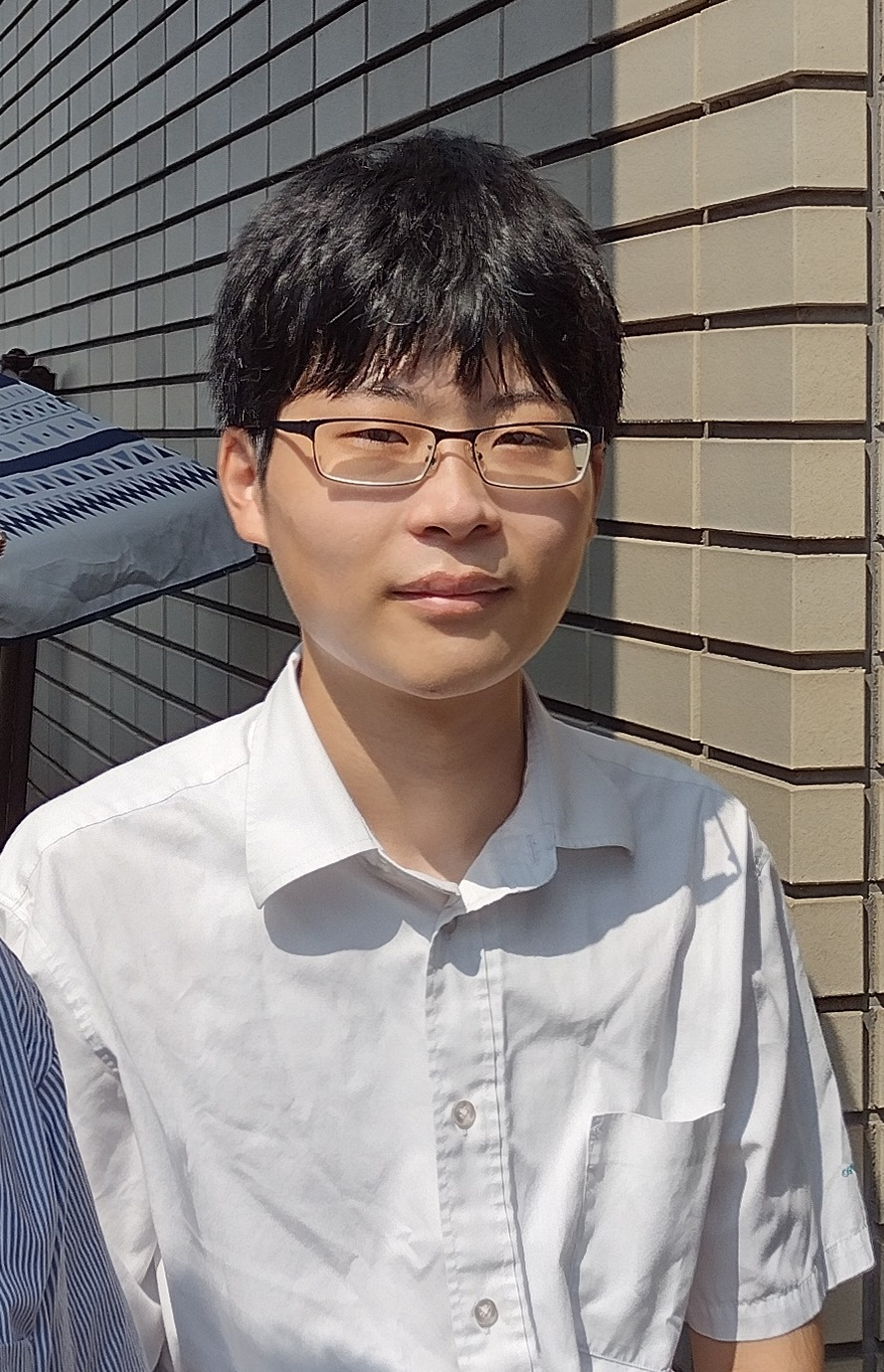
- Fujimoto in September 2023
- Native name: 藤本渚
- Born: July 18, 2005 (age 21)
- Hometown: Takamatsu, Kagawa, Japan

Career
- Achieved professional status: October 1, 2022 (aged 17)
- Badge number: 333
- Rank: 7-dan
- Teacher: Keita Inoue (9-dan)
- Tournaments won: 1
- Meijin class: B1
- Ryūō class: 5

Websites
- JSA profile page

Nagisa Fujimoto (藤本 渚, Fujimoto Nagisa; July 18, 2005) is a Japanese professional shogi player ranked 7-dan.

== Early life, education, amateur shogi and apprenticeship ==
Nagisa Fujimoto was born in Takamatsu, Kagawa on July 18, 2005. He learned how to play shogi at the age of six after receiving a plastic shogi set from his parents as a birthday present, and had obtained the rank of amateur 3-dan by the fall of his first year of elementary school. As a third-year elementary school student, he won the Kagawa Prefectural qualifying tournament for 27th Amateur Ryūō Tournament in April 2014 when he was eight years old to become the youngest winner in the tournament's history. Fujimoto also won Kagawa Prefecture's Amateur Ōza Tournament twice (2014 and 2015) and the prefecture's Amateur Ōi tournament in February 2016.

Fujimoto was accepted into the Japan Shogi Association's (JSA) apprentice school at the rank of 6-kyū under the tutelage of shogi professional Keita Inoue in September 2016.

Fujimoto was promoted to the rank of apprentice professional 3-dan in 2021. He obtained full professional status and the corresponding rank of 4-dan in September 2022 after tying for first with Yuya Saitō in the 71st 3-dan League (April 2022 – September 2022) with a record of 13 wins and 5 losses. He is only the second person from Kagawa Prefecture to become a professional shogi player and the first to do so in 47 years since Kenji Kobayashi did so in 1975.

Fujimoto attended elementary and junior high school in Takamatsu. After graduating junior high school, his family moved to Osaka to make it easier for him to participate in the JSA's apprentice school. As of September 2022, Fujimoto is attending high school in Osaka.

== Shogi professional ==
Fujimoto won his first six official games as a professional before losing by forfeit to Hiroshi Kamiya. Fujimoto's Class 6 Ryūō game against Kameya was scheduled to take place at the JSA Headquarters in Tokyo on February 6, 2023. The game was scheduled for Tokyo per Ryūō rules due to Kamiya being the higher rated player and being based out of Tokyo. Even though both players were notified on the game site in advance, Fujimoto mistakenly thought the game was scheduled to be played at the JSA's Kansai Branch in Osaka instead. By the time he realized his mistake, it was too late for him to get to Tokyo within the required time to play the game, and Kameya was, therefore, declared the winner by forfeit. Fujimoto later apologized to Kamiya over the phone for his mistake and Kamiya told him not to dwell on it but be more careful in the future. Kamiya also stated that it was unfortunate that Fujimoto's winning streak had to end in such a way.

In October 2023, Fujimoto advanced to the finals of the 54th Shinjin-Ō tournament, but lost the best-of-three championship match to Hirotoshi Ueno 2 games to 1. The following month, Fujimoto won his first tournament as a professional by defeating apprentice professional 3-dan Ryūma Yoshiike 2 games to none in the finals of the 13th Kakogawa Seiryū tournament to become the youngest ever to do so.

=== Promotion history ===
The promotion history for Fujimoto is as follows.

- 6-kyū: September 2016
- 3-dan: October 2021
- 4-dan: October 1, 2022
- 5-dan: March 12, 2024
- 6-dan: March 4, 2025
- 7-dan: November 10, 2025

=== Titles and other championships ===
Fujimoto has yet to appear in a major title match, but he has won one non-title tournament.

=== Awards and honors ===
Fujimoto won the JSA's Annual Shogi Awards for "Best New Player" and "Most Games Won" for the April 2023 – March 2024 season, (Note: Fujimoto and Takumi Itō each won 51 games to share the award.) and "Most Consecutive Games Won" for the April 2024 – March 2025 shogi season. (Note: Fujimoto and Reo Okabe each won 17 consecutive games to share the award.)
