= Yūji Masuda =

Japanese shogi player (born 1971)

- Native name: 増田裕司
- Born: February 7, 1971 (age 55)
- Hometown: Gose, Nara

Career
- Achieved professional status: October 1, 1997 (aged 26)
- Badge number: 225
- Rank: 7-dan
- Retired: April 23, 2025 (aged 54)
- Teacher: Nobuo Mori (8-dan)
- Career record: 359–378 (.487)
- Notable students: Kanta Masegi

Websites
- JSA profile page

Yūji Masuda (増田 裕司, Masuda Yūji; February 7, 1971) is a Japanese retired professional shogi player who achieved the rank of 7-dan.

== Shogi professional ==
On April 1, 2025, the JSA announced Masuda had met the conditions for mandatory retirement for "Free Class" players and his retirement would become official upon completion of his final scheduled game of the 2025–2024 shogi season. Masuda's retirement became official upon losing to Yūya Saitō on April 23, 2025, in a 38th Ryūō Group 6 game. He finished his career with a record of 359 wins and 378 losses for a winning percentage of 0.487.

=== Promotion history ===
Masuda's promotion history is as follows:

- 6-kyū: 1985
- 1-dan: 1989
- 4-dan: October 1, 1997
- 5-dan: November 19, 2002
- 6-dan: September 11, 2009
- 7-dan: April 1, 2024
- Retired: April 23, 2025
