= Natsuko Iwasaki =

Japanese shogi player (born 2011)

- Native name: 岩崎 夏子
- Born: July 20, 2011 (age 15)
- Hometown: Ikoma, Nara, Japan

Career
- Achieved professional status: April 1, 2024 (aged 12)
- Badge number: W-90
- Rank: Women's 1-dan
- Teacher: Tadao Kitajima (7-dan)

Websites
- JSA profile page

Natsuko Iwasaki (岩崎 夏子, Iwasaki Natsuko; born July 20, 2011) is a Japanese women's professional shogi player ranked 1-dan.

== Early life ==
Iwasaki was born on July 20, 2011, in Ikoma, Nara. She became interested in shogi after playing Dōbutsu shōgi at her nursery center. At her mother's recommendation, she subsequently began attending a local shogi school after entering elementary school.

On September 24, 2023, she entered the Kantō branch of the Japan Shogi Association's training group system under the guidance of shogi professional Tadao Kitajima and qualified for women's professional status after being promoted to training group B2 in March 2024.

== Apprentice professional ==
Iwasaki entered the JSA's apprentice professional school in September 2025 at the rank of apprentice professional 6-kyū.

== Promotion history ==
Iwasaki's promotion history is as follows.

- 2-kyū: April 1, 2024
- 1-kyū: September 29, 2025
- 1-dan: March 2, 2026

Note: All ranks are women's professional ranks.
