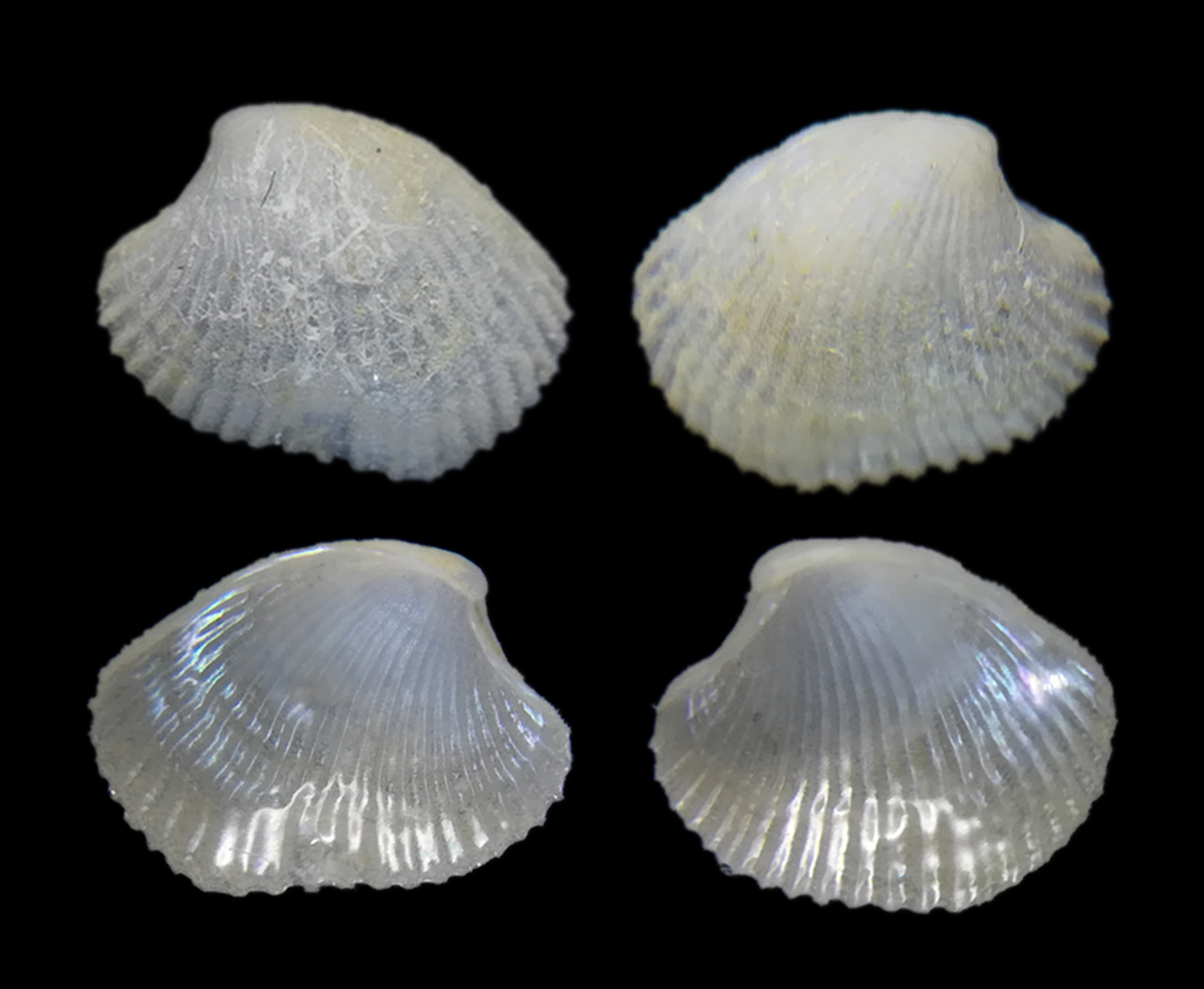
- Haliris pygmaea

Scientific classification
- Kingdom: Animalia
- Phylum: Mollusca
- Class: Bivalvia
- Superfamily: Verticordioidea
- Family: Verticordiidae
- Genus: Haliris
- Species: H. pygmaea

Binomial name
- Haliris pygmaea (Kuroda, 1952)

= Haliris pygmaea =

Species of bivalve

Haliris pygmaea is a species of saltwater clams in the family Verticordiidae.

== Distribution ==
This species is recorded in the Philippines.
