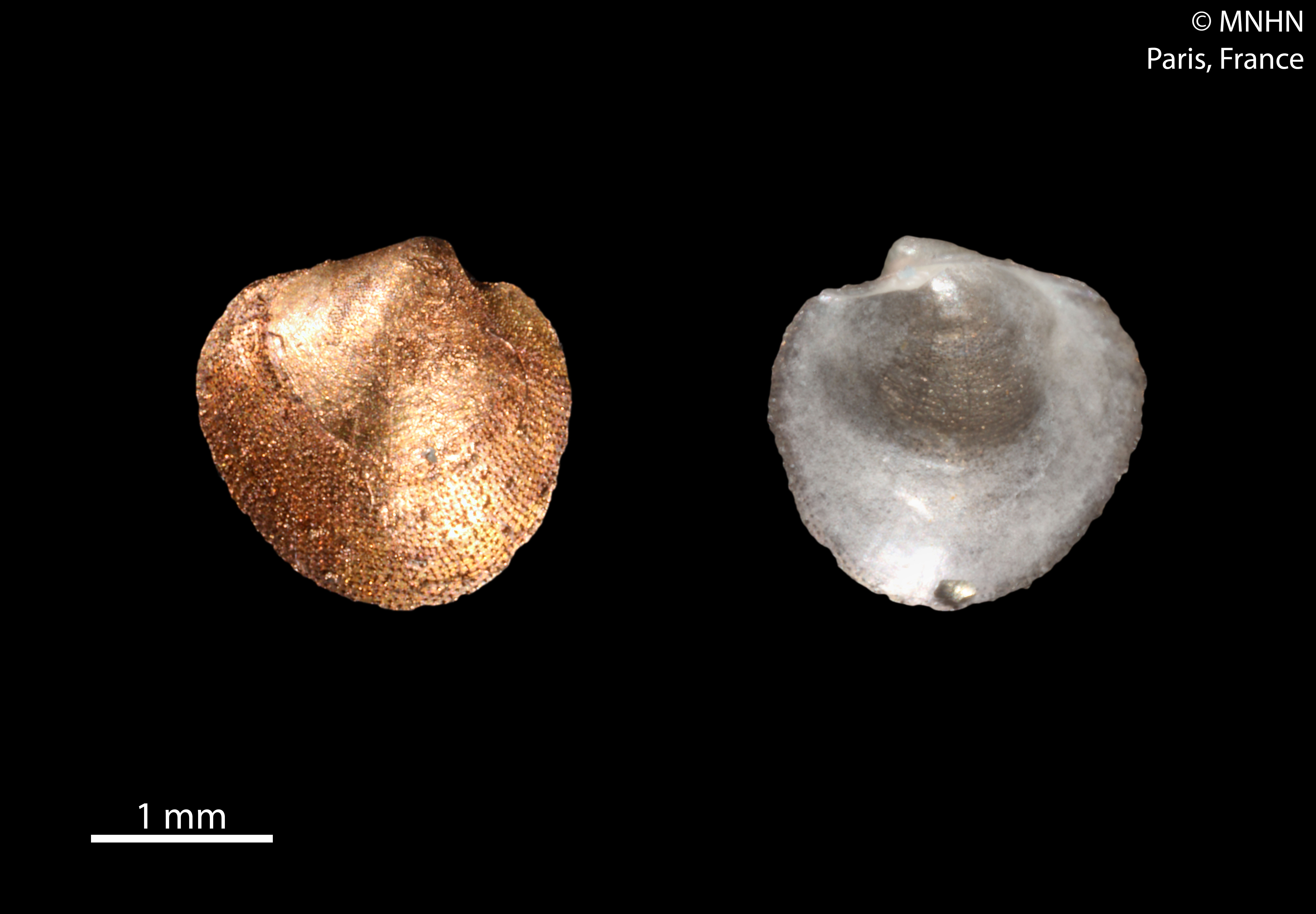
- Verticordia ouricuri (paratype at MNHN, Paris)

Scientific classification
- Kingdom: Animalia
- Phylum: Mollusca
- Class: Bivalvia
- Superorder: Anomalodesmata
- Superfamily: Verticordioidea
- Family: Verticordiidae
- Genus: Verticordia; J.C.Sowerby

Species
- See text.

= Verticordia (bivalve) =

Genus of bivalves

Verticordia is a genus of marine bivalve molluscs in the family Verticordiidae.

They are mostly small, live in deep water and have roughly equal-sized, well-inflated, fragile shells which are pearly inside.

== Species ==
The following is a list of species according to the World Register of Marine Species:

- Verticordia australiensis E.A.Smith
- Verticordia bordaensis Cotton & Godfrey
- † Verticordia cardiiformis J.C.Sowerby
- † Verticordia densicostata P. Marshall
- † Verticordia excavata Pritchard, 1901
- Verticordia expansa Prashad
- Verticordia granulifera (Verrill)
- Verticordia guineensis Thiele
- Verticordia inornata Jaeckel & Thiele
- Verticordia neozelanica (extinct) (Suter)
- Verticordia ouricuri Oliveira & Absalão
- † Verticordia parisiensis Deshayes, 1856
- † Verticordia pectinata Tate, 1887
- Verticordia perversa Dall
- Verticordia quadrata E.A.Smith
- † Verticordia rhomboidea Tate, 1887
- Verticordia seguenzae Dall
- Verticordia tasmanica May
- Verticordia tenerrima Jaeckel & Thiele
- Verticordia woodii E.A.Smith
