= Hiroshi Yamamoto (shogi) =

Japanese shogi player

- Native name: 山本博志
- Born: August 13, 1996 (age 29)
- Hometown: Kōtō

Career
- Achieved professional status: October 1, 2018 (aged 22)
- Badge Number: 316
- Rank: 5-dan
- Teacher: Hisashi Ogura (7-dan)
- Meijin class: C2
- Ryūō class: 5

Websites
- JSA profile page

Hiroshi Yamamoto (山本 博志, Yamamoto Hiroshi; August 13, 1996) is a Japanese professional shogi player ranked 5-dan.

== Early life and apprenticeship ==
Yamamoto was born in Kōtō, Tokyo, on August 13, 1996. He learned how to play shogi from his father when he was a first-grade elementary school student, and began playing at shogi clubs, etc. to improve. When he was elementary school fourth-grade student, Yamamoto began studying under shogi professional Hisashi Ogura, who also lived in Kōtō, and as an eleven-year old in March 2008, he was accepted into the Japan Shogi Association (JSA) apprentice school at the rank of 6-kyū with Ogura as his sponsor.

Yamamoto was promoted to apprentice professional 3-dan in October 2015, and obtained full professional status and the rank of 4-dan on October 1, 2018, after finishing second the 63rd 3-dan League (April–September 2018) with a record of 13 wins and 5 losses.

== Shogi professional ==
=== Promotion history ===
Yamamoto's promotion history is as follows.

- 6-kyū: March 2008
- 3-dan: October 2015
- 4-dan: October 1, 2018
- 5-dan: April 17, 2023
