= Takuya Nishida =

Japanese shogi player (born 1991)

- Native name: 西田拓也
- Born: August 25, 1991 (age 34)
- Hometown: Kyoto, Japan

Career
- Achieved professional status: April 1, 2017 (aged 25)
- Badge number: 309
- Rank: 6-dan
- Teacher: Nobuo Mori (7-dan)
- Tournaments won: 1
- Meijin class: B2
- Ryūō class: 6

Websites
- JSA profile page

Takuya Nishida (西田 拓也, Nishida Takuya; born August 25, 1991) is a Japanese professional shogi player ranked 6-dan.

== Early life, amateur shogi and apprenticeship ==
Nishida was born in Kyoto, Japan on August 25, 1991. He learned how to play shogi from a book that his parent bought for him, and made it to the semi-finals of the 28th Elementary School Student Meijin Tournament as a sixth-grade elementary school student in 2003 before losing to future fellow shogi professional and eventual tournament winner Kazuo Sugimoto.

Nishida entered the Japan Shogi Association's apprentice school at the rank of 6-kyū as a student of shogi professional Nobuo Mori in April 2005. He was promoted to the rank of 3-dan in October 2008 and obtained professional status and the rank of 4-dan in April 2017 after winning the 60th 3-dan League (October 2016 – March 2017) with a record of 15 wins and 3 losses.

== Shogi professional ==
In October 2017, Nishida defeated defending champion Junpei Ide 2 games to 1 to win the 7th Kakogawa Seiryū Tournament.

=== Promotion history ===
The promotion history for Nishida is as follows:

- 6-kyū: April 2005
- 3-dan: October 2008
- 4-dan: April 1, 2017
- 5-dan: February 19, 2021
- 6-dan: June 17, 2025

=== Titles and other championships ===
Nishida has yet to appear in a major title match, but has won one non-title shogi tournament.
