= Asia-Pacific Management Accounting Association =

The Asia-Pacific Management Accounting Association (APMAA) was founded in 2004. It is an academic organization that supports members for their research and practices on management accounting in the Asia-Pacific region.

== Overview ==
APMAA was organized by members whose activities and/or research interests relate to management accounting in the Asia-Pacific region. The association is recognized as an international organization and is listed in the Yearbook of International Organizations by the Union of International Associations (UIA).

== Objectives ==
The Asia-Pacific Management Accounting Association provides a platform for management accounting academics and practitioners mainly in the Asia-Pacific region to improve their contribution to global scholarship and to the lives of the people of the region. APMAA accomplishes the above purpose through fostering worldwide connections of communication, learning and sharing of management accounting knowledge in the areas of education, research, and practice.

== Annual conference ==
Since its inception, the APMAA has held annual conferences across the region to promote research and collaboration. The 2016 (12th) annual conference was hosted by National Taipei University, Taiwan. The 15th annual conference was hosted in Doha, Qatar in 2019, focusing on global management accounting challenges. Subsequent meetings, such as the 2024 conference in Vietnam, have addressed sustainable development for enterprises.

=== List of past annual conferences ===
The 2020 Annual Conference was suspended due to the COVID-19 pandemic.

- The 2019 Annual Conference was hosted by Qatar University, Qatar.
- The 2018 Annual Conference was hosted by APMAA and Waseda University, Tokyo, Japan.
- The 2017 Annual Conference was hosted by Shanghai Jiao Tong University, China.
- The 2016 Annual Conference was hosted by National Taipei University, Taiwan.
- The 2015 Annual Conference was hosted by a consortium of six universities in Indonesia: University of Merdeka Malang, Udayana University, Warmadewa University, Hasanudin University, Mercubuana University, and Trisakti University.
- The 2014 Annual Conference was hosted by Chulalongkorn University, Thailand.
- The 2013 Annual Conference was hosted by APMAA Japan.
- The 2012 Annual Conference was hosted by University of Xiamen, China.
- The 2011 Annual Conference was hosted by Universiti Teknologi MARA, Malaysia.
- The 2010 Annual Forum was hosted by National Taiwan University.
- The 2009 Annual Forum was hosted by Beppu University, Japan.
- The 2007 Annual Forum was hosted by Southwestern University of Finance and Economics, China.
- The 2006 Annual Forum was held in Fukuoka, Japan.
- The 2004 Annual Forum was held in Malaysia.
- The 2002 Annual Forum was held in Fukuoka, Japan.

== Journal ==
The association publishes the Asia-Pacific Management Accounting Journal (APMAJ) three times a year. The journal serves as a platform for disseminating research findings in management accounting within the region. It is indexed in several academic databases, and past issues are archived on the official university hosting platform.

== APMAA News ==
APMAA News is the electronic newsletter of the Asia-Pacific Management Accounting Association. It is published online three times per year in English. The newsletter reports on relevant APMAA events, professional activities, and announcements involving members and their associates.
