= Japanese Association of Management Accounting =

Professional association

The Japanese Association of Management Accounting (JAMA; Japanese: 日本管理会計学会) was founded in 1991 and has devoted to promote studies and practices of management accounting.

== About JAMA ==
JAMA was preceded by the Association of Quantitative Accounting founded by Dr. Yoichi Kata-oka, JAMA, is an academic organization of management accounting researchers, educators, and professional. Currently, JAMA has approximately 800 members.

== Objectives ==
JAMA provides a variety of services to its members and the profession, including:

- Annual meetings
- Forums
- Research seminars
- Journals, e.g. The Journal of Management Accounting (管理会計学) ISSN 0918-7863
- Accounting books and monographs
