= Reiko Okutani =

Japanese businesswoman (born 1950)

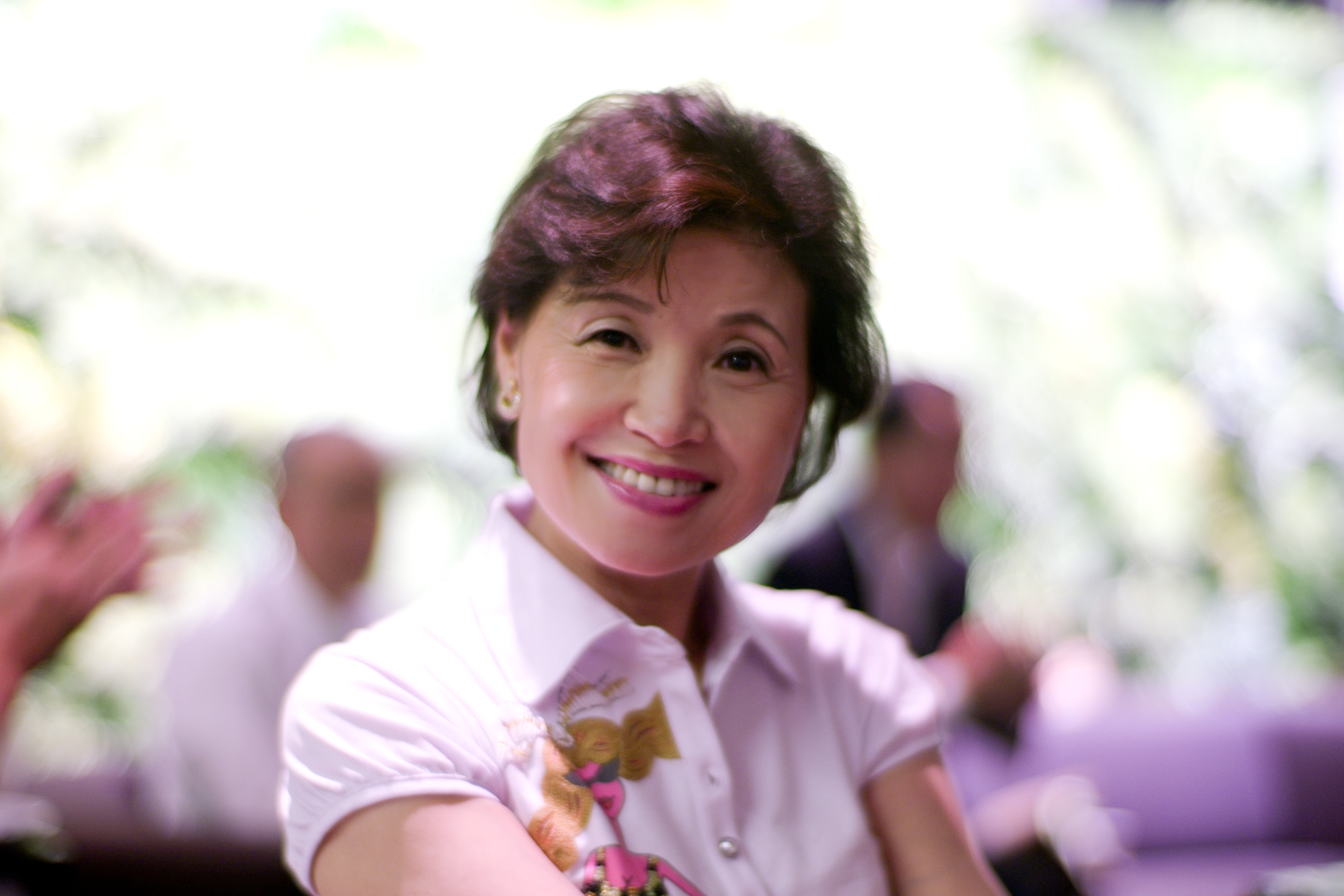
Reiko Okutani, Jun. 2009

Reiko Okutani (奥谷 禮子, Okutani Reiko; born April 4, 1950 in Kobe, Hyōgo) is a Japanese businesswoman, founder and chief executive of the temporary personnel service company The R. She serves on the board of Culture Convenience Club Co., Ltd. A graduate of Konan University, she is best known for her criticism of "gap-widening society".

She also presented the 120th GRIPS Forum on the challenges for Japanese women in the workforce.
