= Mikio Kariyama =

Japanese shogi player (born 2001)

- Native name: 狩山幹生
- Born: November 12, 2001 (age 23)
- Hometown: Kurashiki, Japan

Career
- Achieved professional status: October 1, 2021 (aged 19)
- Badge Number: 330
- Rank: 5-dan
- Teacher: Keita Inoue (9-dan)
- Meijin class: C2
- Ryūō class: 4

Websites
- JSA profile page

Mikio Kariyama (狩山 幹生, Kariyama Mikio; November 12, 2001) is a Japanese professional shogi player ranked 5-dan.

== Early life and apprenticeship ==
Mikio Kariyama was born in Kurashiki on November 12, 2001. He learned how to play shogi from his father, and was accepted into the Japan Shogi Association's (JSA) apprentice school at the rank of 6-kyū under the tutelage of shogi professional Keita Inoue in September 2014.

Kariyama was promoted to the rank of apprentice professional 3-dan in 2019. He obtained full professional status and the corresponding rank of 4-dan in September 2021 after tying for first with Tomoki Yokoyama in the 69th 3-dan League (April 2021 – September 2021) with a record of 13 wins and 5 losses.

== Shogi professional ==
=== Promotion history ===
The promotion history for Kariyama is as follows.

- 6-kyū: September 1, 2014
- 3-dan: October 2019
- 4-dan: October 1, 2021
- 5-dan: November 5, 2024
