= Tomoki Yokoyama =

Japanese shogi player (born 2000)

- Native name: 横山友紀
- Born: January 26, 2000 (age 26)
- Hometown: Kakogawa, Hyōgo, Japan

Career
- Achieved professional status: October 1, 2021 (aged 21)
- Badge number: 329
- Rank: 4-dan
- Teacher: Keita Inoue (9-dan)
- Meijin class: C2
- Ryūō class: 6

Websites
- JSA profile page

Tomoki Yokoyama (横山 友紀, Yokoyama Tomoki; January 26, 2000) is a Japanese professional shogi player ranked 4-dan.

== Early life and apprenticeship ==
Tomoki Yokoyama was born in Kakogawa, Hyōgo, on January 26, 2000. He learned how to play shogi from his father, and was accepted into the Japan Shogi Association's (JSA) apprentice school at the rank of 6-kyū under the tutelage of shogi professional Keita Inoue in September 2012.

Yokoyma was promoted to the rank of apprentice professional 1-dan in 2014, and apprentice professional 3-dan in 2017. He obtained full professional status and the corresponding rank of 4-dan in September 2021 after tying for first with Mikio Kariyama in the 69th 3-dan League (April 2021 – September 2021) with a record of 13 wins and 5 losses.

== Shogi professional ==
=== Promotion history ===
The promotion history for Yokoyama is as follows.

- 6-kyū: September 1, 2012
- 1-dan: December 23, 2014
- 3-dan: October 2017
- 4-dan: October 1, 2021

== Personal life ==
Yokoyama is a graduate of the Faculty of Law of Konan University. He is the first student from the school to become a professional shogi player.
