= Keita Inoue =

Japanese shogi player (born 1964)

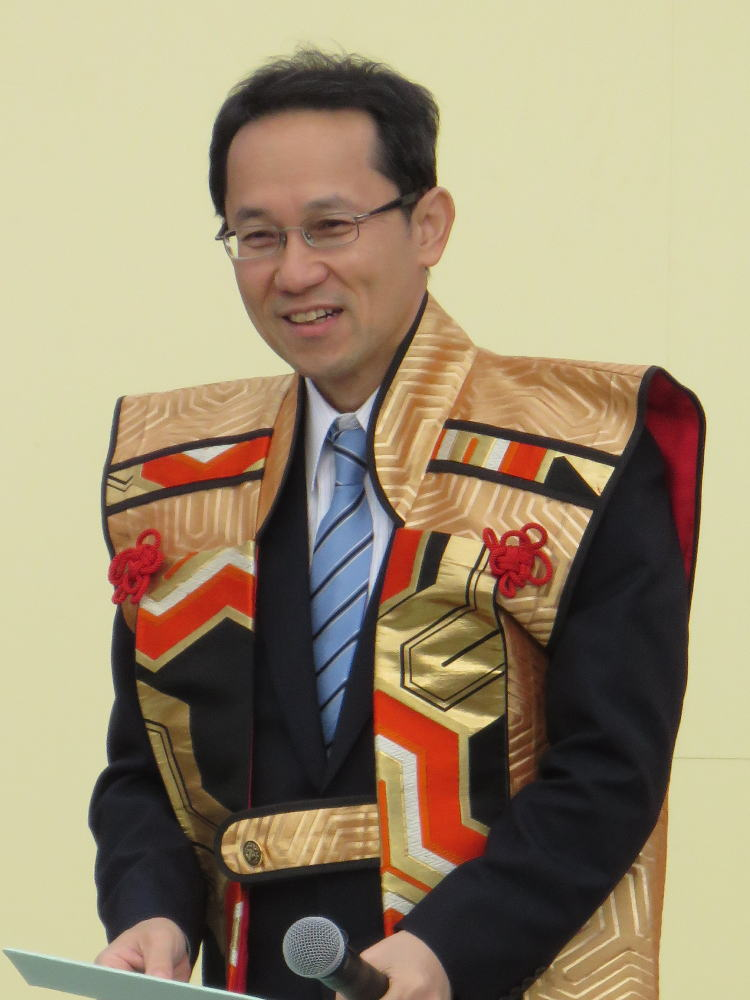
- Inoue at a human shogi event in November 2016.
- Native name: 井上慶太
- Born: January 17, 1964 (age 61)
- Hometown: Ashiya, Hyōgo

Career
- Achieved professional status: February 4, 1983 (aged 19)
- Badge Number: 157
- Rank: 9-dan
- Teacher: Masakazu Wakamatsu (8-dan)
- Tournaments won: 2
- Meijin class: C1
- Ryūō class: 5
- Notable students: Akira Inaba; Tatsuya Sugai; Kōhei Funae; Wakamu Deguchi; Tomoki Yokoyama; Mikio Kariyama; Nagisa Fujimoto; Hirotoshi Ueno}; Toshiki Sumisaki; Hiroto Ikegaki; Nanami Naka

Websites
- JSA profile page

Keita Inoue (井上 慶太, Inoue Keita; born January 17, 1964) is a Japanese professional shogi player, ranked 9-dan. He is a former executive director of the Japan Shogi Association.

== Early life and apprenticeship ==
Keita Inoue was born on January 17, 1964, in Ashiya, Hyōgo. In October 1979, he entered the Japan Shogi Association's apprentice school at the rank of 6-kyū under the sponsorship of shogi professional Masakazu Wakamatsu. He was promoted to 1-dan in 1981, and obtained full professional status and the rank of 4-dan in February 1983.

== Shogi professional ==
Inoue's first tournament victory as a professional came in October 1985 when he defeated Taku Morishita 2 games to 1 to win the 16th Shinjin-Ō tournament. The following year, he also won the 9th Young Lions tournament.

On October 28, 2008, Inoue defeated Kunio Naitō in an Ōi tournament preliminary round game to become the 37th professional to win 600 official games.

On March 28, 2018, Inoue defeated Sōta Fujii in a third round preliminary round game for the 68th Ōshō Tournament. The game was broadcast live by the Igo & Shogi Channel as part of its "Shogi Premium" service. Inoue's victory not only made him the first player aged 50 or older to defeat Fujii in an official game, but also stopped Fujii's 16 game winning streak.

On October 3, 2025, Inoue defeated Masayuki Toyoshima in a 11th Eiō tournament preliminary round game to become the 28th person to win 800 official games as a professional; he was awarded the "Shogi Honor Fighting-spirit Award" as a result.

=== Promotion history ===
The promotion history for Inoue is as follows:

- 6-kyū: 1979
- 1-dan: 1981
- 4-dan: February 4, 1983
- 5-dan: March 27, 1987
- 6-dan: July 12, 1991
- 7-dan: April 1, 1996
- 8-dan: April 1, 1997
- 9-dan: March 3, 2011

=== Titles and other championships ===
Inoue has yet to make an appearance in a major title match, but he has won two non-major shogi championships during his career: the Shinjin-Ō in 1985 and the Young Lions in 1986.

=== Awards and honors ===
Inoue received the Japan Shogi Association Annual Shogi Award for "Best Winning Percentage" in 1993. He also received the association's "Shogi Honor Award" in 2008 in recognition of winning 600 official games and the "Shogi Honor Fighting-spirit Award" in 2025 in recognition of winning 800 official games.

== JSA director and other offices ==
Inoue has served on the Japan Shogi Association's board of directors since 2015. From June 2015 until June 2017, he served as a non-executive director. He was re-elected to the board for another two-year term in June 2017, but this time as an executive director. He was re-elected for additional two-year terms as executive director in June 2019, June 2021 and June 2023.

Inoue served as a vice-president of the Shogi Professional Players' Association from April 2011 until June 2015, and also as the manager of the Kansai branch of the Japan Shogi Association's apprentice school from April 2001 until March 2004.
