= Kōji Tosa =

Japanese shogi player

- Native name: 土佐浩司
- Born: March 30, 1955 (age 70)
- Hometown: Minamiuonuma
- Nationality: Japanese

Career
- Achieved professional status: February 19, 1976 (aged 20)
- Badge Number: 124
- Rank: 8-dan
- Retired: May 14, 2020 (aged 65)
- Teacher: Shizuo Seino (8-dan)
- Tournaments won: 1
- Career record: 666–728 (.478)

Websites
- JSA profile page

Kōji Tosa (土佐 浩司, Tosa Kōji; March 30, 1955) is a Japanese retired professional shogi player who achieved the rank of 8-dan.

== Shogi professional ==
Tosa's only tournament victory as a shogi professional came in 1998 when he defeated Toshiyuki Moriuchi to win the 32nd Hayazashi Shogi Senshuken.

In August 2010, Tosa defeated Kiyozumi Kiriyama in 69th Meijin Class B2 league play to become the 42nd professional to win 600 official games.

In March 2017, Tosa finished the finished 75th Meijin Class C2 league play (April 2016 – March 2017) with a record of no wins and 10 losses, earning a second demotion point which meant he was only one point away from automatic demotion to "Free Class" play. As a result, he declared his intention to the Japan Shogi Association to become a Free Class player as of April 2017 rather than risk automatic demotion.

On June 8, 2020, the Japan Shogi Association announced on its website that Tosa had retired from professional shogi. His official retirement date was given as May 14, 2020. Tosa retired with a career record of 666 wins and 728 losses for a winning percentage of 0.478.

=== Promotion history ===
The promotion history for Tosa is as follows:

- 6-kyū: 1971
- 1-dan: 1973
- 4-dan: February 19, 1976
- 5-dan: April 1, 1984
- 6-dan: April 14, 1989
- 7-dan: July 25, 1997
- 8-dan: September 18, 2014
- Retired: May 14, 2020

=== Titles and other championships ===
Tosa has never appeared in a major title match, but he has won one non-title shogi championships during his career.

=== Awards and honors ===
Tosa received the JSA's "25 Years Service Award" in 2000 in recognition of being an active professional for twenty-five years and the "Shogi Honor Award" in 2010 for winning 600 official games.
