= Tadao Kitajima =

Japanese shogi player

- Native name: 北島忠雄
- Born: January 4, 1966 (age 60)
- Hometown: Tokyo Metropolis

Career
- Achieved professional status: April 1, 1995 (aged 29)
- Badge number: 214
- Rank: 7-dan
- Teacher: Shigeru Sekine (9-dan)
- Meijin class: C2
- Ryūō class: 4
- Notable students: Aya Uchiyama; Natsuko Iwasaki

Websites
- JSA profile page

Tadao Kitajima (北島 忠雄, Kitajima Tadao; born January 4, 1966) is a Japanese professional shogi player ranked 7-dan. He is a former director of the Japan Shogi Association.

== Early life and apprenticeship ==
Kitajima was born in Tokyo on January 1, 1966. He entered the Japan Shogi Association's apprentice school in November 1980 at the rank 6-kyū as a student of shogi professional Shigeru Sekine. He was promoted to the rank of 1-dan in 1983 and obtained full professional status and the rank of 4-dan in April 1995.

== Shogi professional ==
=== Promotion history ===
Kitajima's promotion history is as follows:

- 6-kyū: 1980
- 1-dan: 1983
- 4-dan: April 1, 1995
- 5-dan: June 3, 1999
- 6-dan: October 1, 2003
- 7-dan: August 14, 2014

== JSA director ==
Tadajima is a former member of the Japan Shogi Association's board of directors, having served as a director from 2002 to 2004 and then again from 2011 to 2013.
