= Kenshi Tokuda =

Japanese shogi player (born 1997)

- Native name: 徳田拳士
- Born: December 9, 1997 (age 28)
- Hometown: Shūnan, Yamaguchi Prefecture, Japan

Career
- Achieved professional status: April 1, 2022 (aged 24)
- Badge Number: 332
- Rank: 5-dan
- Teacher: Kenji Kobayashi (9-dan)
- Tournaments won: 1
- Meijin class: C2
- Ryūō class: 6

Websites
- JSA profile page

Kenshi Tokuda (徳田 拳士, Tokuda Kenshi; December 9, 1997) is a Japanese professional shogi player ranked 5-dan.

== Early life, amateur shogi and apprentice professional ==
Tokuda was born in Shūnan, Yamaguchi Prefecture, on December 9, 1997. He learned how to play shogi from watching his grandfather and father play and won the Elementary School Student Meijin Tournament in 2009.

Tokuda was accepted into the Japan Shogi Association's (JSA) apprentice school at the rank of 6-kyū as a student of shogi professional Kenji Kobayashi in September 2010. He was promoted to the rank of apprentice professional 3-dan in 2018, and obtained full professional status and the corresponding rank of 4-dan in April 2022 after tying for first with Reo Okabe in the 70th 3-dan League (October 2021 – March 2022) with a record of 15 wins and 3 losses.

== Shogi professional ==
Tokuda was one of the five regular professionals to be selected as an opponent for women's professional Kana Fukuma in her first attempt to pass the Professional Admission Test in August–October 2022. Tokuda and Fukuma met in Game 1 on August 18 in Osaka with Tokuda moving first and ultimately winning in 127 moves.

Tokuda won the 12th Kakogawa Seiryū Tournament in October 2022 by defeating amateur professional 3-dan Yūki Saitō 2 games to 0 in the best-of-three championship match.

=== Promotion history ===
The promotion history for Tokuda is as follows.

- 6-kyū: September 2010
- 3-dan: April 2018
- 4-dan: April 1, 2022
- 5-dan: March 6, 2026

=== Titles and other championships ===
Tokuda has yet to appear in a major title match, but he has won one non-title tournament.
