= Kenji Imaizumi =

Japanese shogi player

- Native name: 今泉健司
- Born: July 3, 1973 (age 52)
- Hometown: Fukuyama, Hiroshima

Career
- Achieved professional status: April 1, 2015 (aged 41)
- Badge Number: 299
- Rank: 5-dan
- Teacher: Hiroto Kiritani (7-dan)
- Meijin class: C2
- Ryūō class: 6

Websites
- JSA profile page
- Official website

Kenji Imaizumi (今泉 健司, Imaizumi Kenji; born July 3, 1973) is a Japanese professional shogi player ranked 5-dan.

Imaizumi (a former 3-dan professional shogi apprentice) was the first amateur to become a professional player via the Professional Admission Test (プロ編入試験 puro henyū shiken) in 2014.

== Shogi professional ==
=== Promotion history ===
The promotion history for Imaizumi is as follows:

- 4-dan: April 1, 2015
- 5-Dan: June 18, 2020

=== Awards and honors ===
Imaizumi received the Japan Shogi Association's Masuda Award for the 2007–2008 shogi season for his idea of playing "R-32" on move one as gote in the opening. He was the first apprentice professional to win the award.
