= Toshiaki Kubo =

Japanese shogi player (born 1975)

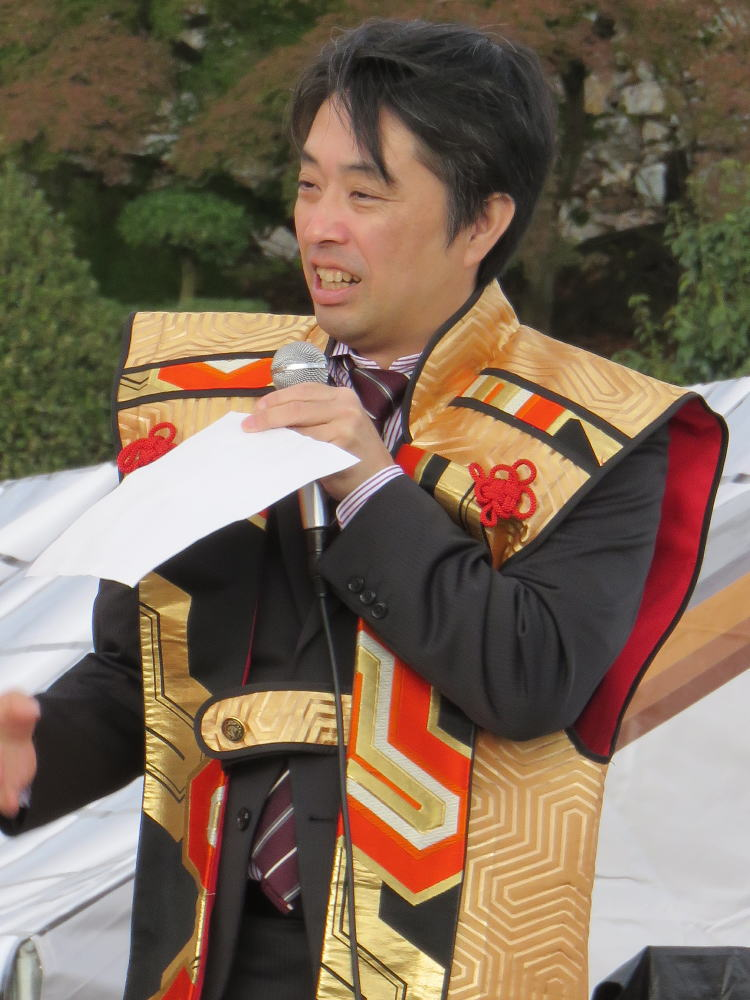
- Kubo at a human shogi event in November 2016.
- Native name: 久保利明
- Born: August 27, 1975 (age 50)
- Hometown: Kakogawa, Hyōgo

Career
- Achieved professional status: April 1, 1993 (aged 17)
- Badge number: 207
- Rank: 9 dan
- Teacher: Hitoshige Awaji
- Major titles won: 7
- Tournaments won: 6
- Meijin class: B1
- Ryūō class: 1
- Notable students: Nana Sakaki; Shōko Kubo

Websites
- JSA profile page

Toshiaki Kubo (久保 利明, Kubo Toshiaki; born August 27, 1975) is a Japanese professional shogi player ranked 9-dan. He is a former Ōshō and Kiō title holder.

== Early life ==
Kubo was born in Kakogawa, Hyōgo on August 27, 1975. He learned shogi when he was about four years old, and at the encouragement of a friend of his father soon began playing regularly at the Kobe Shogi Center in neighboring Kobe. The center was managed by shogi professional Hitoshige Awaji who became Kubo's shogi teacher after the two played a 19-piece "Naked King" handicap game. In 1986, he advanced to the semi-finals of the 11th Elementary Student Meijin Tournament as fifth-grade elementary school student, but lost to the eventual tournament winner and fellow future shogi professional Daisuke Suzuki. Later that same year, Kubo entered the Japan Shogi Association's apprentice school at the rank of 6-kyū under the guidance of Awaji. He was awarded professional status and the rank of 4-dan on April 1, 1993, at the age of 17.

== Shogi professional ==
Kubo's first appearance in a major title match came in 2000 when he challenged Yoshiharu Habu for the 26th Kiō title. Kubo advanced to the title match by defeating Masataka Gōda 2 games to 0 to win the two-game challenger playoff, but was unable to defeat Habu, losing the match 3 game to 1. The following year, he also challenged Habu for the 49th Ōza title, but lost once again by the same score. In 2007, Kubo once again challenged Habu in the 55th Ōza title match, but was defeated 3 games to 0.

Kubo's first major title victory came in 2009 when he defeated Yasumitsu Satō 3 games to 2 to take the 34th Kiō title. Kubo successfully defended his title for the next two years by defeating Satō once again 3 games to 2 in 2010 and Akira Watanabe 3 games to 1 in 2011. Kubo, however, was unable to defend his title for the third consecutive year, losing the 37th title match to Gōda 3 games to 1.

In 2008, Kubo challenged Habu for the 57th Ōshō title, but lost the match 4 games to 1. The two met again in 2009 for the 59th Ōshō title, and this time Kubo was the winner by the score of 4 games to 2. The victory made Kubo a "2-crown" (a player who simultaneously holds two major titles) for the first time. Kubo successfully defended his title the following year by defeating Masayuki Toyoshima 4 games to 2, but lost the 61st Ōshō title match to Satō 4 games to 1 in 2012. Kubo won the title for the third time in 2017 when he defeated Gōda 4 games to 2 to win the 66th Ōshō title, and successfully defend his title in 2018 when defeated Toyoshima once again 4 games to 2 to win the 67th Ōshō title. Kubo, however, was unable to defend his title once again the following year when he lost the 68th Ōshō match to Watanabe 4 games to none.

In September–October 2020, Kubo challenged Takuya Nagase for the 68th Ōza title, but lost the match 3 games to 2.

On November 5, 2021, Kubo defeated Shin'ya Satō in an Asahi Cup Open to become the 25th person to win 800 official games as a professional and was awarded the "Shogi Honor Fighting-spirit Award" as a result.

=== Playing style ===
Kubo is considered to be one of the foremost specialists in the Ranging Rook opening and has been nicknamed the "Sabaki Artist" (さばきのアーティスト) by fellow professionals for his skill at handling such positions. He is also known for his ability to persevere in difficult, even disadvantageous, positions and has been nicknamed the "Nebari Artist" (ねばりのアーティスト) as well. Kubo along with fellow ranging rook specialists Takeshi Fujii and Daisuke Suzuki are collectively referred to as the "Ranging Rook Big Three".

=== Promotion history ===
Kubo's promotion history is as follows:

- 6-kyū: 1986
- 1-dan: 1989
- 4-dan: April 1, 1993
- 5-dan: April 1, 1995
- 6-dan: November 25, 1998
- 7-dan: April 1, 2001
- 8-dan: April 1, 2003
- 9-dan: March 30, 2010

=== Titles and other championships ===
Kubo has appeared in major title matches a total of fifteen times, and has won the Kiō title three times and Ōshō title four times. In addition to major titles, Kubo has won six other shogi championships during his career.

==== Major titles ====
Title	Years	Number of times overall
Kiō	2008–10	3
Ōshō	2009–10, 2016–17	4

==== Other championships ====
Tournament	Years	Number of times
^{*}Daiwa Securities Strongest Player Cup	2010	1
Ginga Tournament	2017	1
NHK Cup	2003	1
JT Nihon Series	2012–13	2
^{*}All Star Kachinuki-sen	1998	1

Note: Tournaments marked with an asterisk (*) are no longer held.

=== Awards and honors ===
Kubo has received a number awards and honors throughout his career for his accomplishments both on an off the shogi board. These include awards given out annually by the JSA for performance in official games as well as other awards for achievement.

==== Annual shogi awards ====
- 22nd Annual Awards (April 1994 – March 1995): Best Winning Percentage
- 26th Annual Awards (April 1998 – March 1999): Most Consecutive Games Won
- 28th Annual Awards (April 2000 – March 2001): Fighting-spirit Award
- 31st Annual Awards (April 2003 – March 2004): Distinguished Service
- 36th Annual Awards (April 2008 – March 2009): Fighting-spirit Award, Most Games Played, Most Games Won, Kōzō Masuda Award
- 37th Annual Awards (April 2009 – March 2010): Excellent Player, Most Games Played, Game of the Year
- 38th Annual Awards (April 2010 – March 2011): Excellent Player
- 41st Annual Awards (April 2013 – March 2014): Special Game of the Year Award
- 44th Annual Awards (April 2016 – March 2017): Fighting-spirit Award

==== Other awards ====
- 2013: Shogi Honor Award (Awarded by the JSA in recognition of winning 600 official games as a professional)
- 2021: Shogi Honor Fighting-spirit Award (Awarded by JSA in recognition of winning 800 official games as a professional)

=== Year-end prize money and game fee ranking ===
Kubo has finished in the "Top 10" of the JSA's year-end prize money and game fee rankings fourteen times and in the "Top 3" twice since turning professional.

Year	Amount	Rank
2001	¥24,400,000	8th
2003	¥18,180,000	10th
2004	¥24,407,000	7th
2007	¥26,800,000	7th
2008	¥24,020,000	8th
2009	¥33,410,000	4th
2010	¥48,290,000	3rd
2011	¥46,590,000	3rd
2012	¥32,330,000	6th
2013	¥17,880,000	9th
2017	¥30,190,000	4th
2018	¥25,980,000	7th
2019	¥21,780,000	8th
2020	\24,210,000	7th

- Note: All amounts are given in Japanese yen and include prize money and fees earned from official tournaments and games held from January 1 to December 31.

== Personal life ==
Kubo's eldest daughter Shōko is a women's professional shogi player.
