= Trigonulina ornata =

Scientific classification
- Kingdom: Animalia
- Phylum: Mollusca
- Class: Bivalvia
- Family: Verticordiidae
- Genus: Trigonulina
- Species: T. ornata

Binomial name
- Trigonulina ornata (d'Orbigny, 1853)

Species of mollusc

Trigonulina ornata, commonly known as the "'Ornate verticord", is a carnivorous bivalve in the family Verticordiidae. It is native to coastal waters throughout the western Atlantic Ocean at depths of 18-850 meters below the surface. It has 8-11 prominent ribs on its surface and can be a maximum of 5.6 millimeters in size, though on average ranges from 1-3.6 millimeters.
