= Reo Okabe =

Japanese shogi player (born 1999)

- Native name: 岡部怜央
- Born: April 8, 1999 (age 27)
- Hometown: Tsuruoka, Yamagata Prefecture, Japan

Career
- Achieved professional status: April 1, 2022 (aged 22)
- Badge number: 331
- Rank: 6-dan
- Teacher: Jun'ichi Kase (7-dan)
- Meijin class: B2
- Ryūō class: 6

Websites
- JSA profile page

Reo Okabe (岡部 怜央, Okabe Reo; April 8, 1999) is a Japanese professional shogi player ranked 6-dan.

== Early life and apprenticeship ==
Okabe was born in Tsuruoka, Yamagata Prefecture on April 8, 1999. He learned how to play shogi from watching his older brother and grandfather play, and eventually was accepted into the Japan Shogi Association's (JSA) apprentice school at the rank of 6-kyū as a student of shogi professional Jun'ichi Kase in September 2011.

Okabe was promoted to the rank of apprentice professional 3-dan in 2016. He obtained full professional status and the corresponding rank of 4-dan in April 2022 after tying for first with Kenshi Tokuda in the 70th 3-dan League (October 2021 – March 2022) with a record of 15 wins and 3 losses.

== Shogi professional ==
=== Promotion history ===
The promotion history for Okabe is as follows.

- 6-kyū: September 2011
- 3-dan: October 2016
- 4-dan: April 1, 2022
- 5-dan: March 11, 2025
- 6-dan: March 3, 2026

=== Awards and honors ===
Okabe won the Japan Shogi Association's Annual Shogi Awards for "Best New Player", "Most Games Played", "Most Games Won" and "Most Consecutive Games Won" (Note: Okabe and Nagisa Fujimoto each won 17 consecutive games to share the award.) for the April 2024 – March 2025 shogi year.
