= Shogi =

Japanese strategy board game

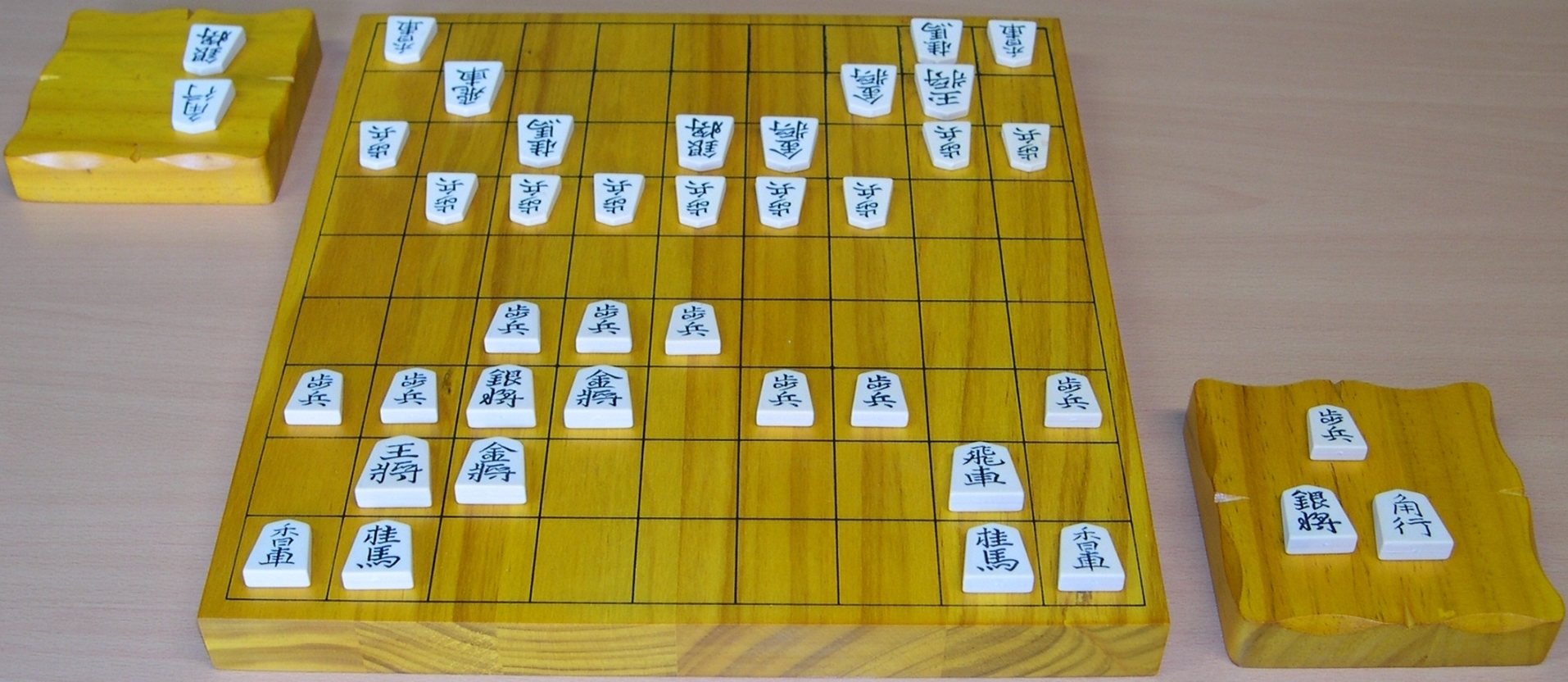
- A game of shogi (showing the fortress opening or yagura)
- Genres: Board game; Abstract strategy game; Mind sport
- Players: 2
- Setup time: < 2 minutes
- Playing time: 30 mins. to 2 hours (typically)
- Chance: None
- Skills: Strategy, tactics
- Synonyms: Japanese chess; Game of Generals

Shogi (将棋, shōgi; English: /ˈʃoʊɡi/, Japanese: [ɕo̞ːɡʲi]), also known as Japanese chess, is an abstract strategy board game for two players. It is one of the most popular board games in Japan and is in the same family of games as Western chess, chaturanga, xiangqi, Indian chess, makruk, and janggi. Shōgi means general's (shō 将) board game (gi 棋). The term shōgi is most commonly used to describe hon-shōgi ("standard shogi"), a term used to distinguish the most popular form of the game (with an 81-square board and 40 pieces) from other forms like ko-shogi (ancient shogi variants like chu shogi), modern shogi variants, and related games.

A distinctive feature of shogi is that after a player has captured an opponent's piece, they retain these as "pieces in hand" (mochigoma), which can be dropped back into the game on a future turn. Shogi was the earliest historical chess-like game with this game mechanic. This drop rule is speculated to have been invented in the 15th century and possibly connected to the practice of 15th-century mercenary samurai switching loyalties when captured in battle. Due to the larger board and the drop rule, modern shogi has a significantly higher game tree complexity than FIDE chess, estimated at approximately 10^{226} compared to 10^{123} for chess. Another key feature of shogi is its decisiveness, as draws are very rare, occurring at a rate of 2–3% in professional games compared to a FIDE chess rate of over 50%. Furthermore, the first-turn advantage in shogi is smaller than in chess, even when games are played by the strongest shogi engines.

The earliest predecessor of the game, chaturanga, originated in India in the 6th century, and the game was likely transmitted to Japan via China or Korea sometime after the Nara period. Shogi in its present form was played as early as the 15th century, while a direct ancestor without the drop rule was recorded from 1210 in a historical document Nichūreki, which is an edited copy of Shōchūreki and Kaichūreki from the late Heian period (c. 1120).

== Equipment ==
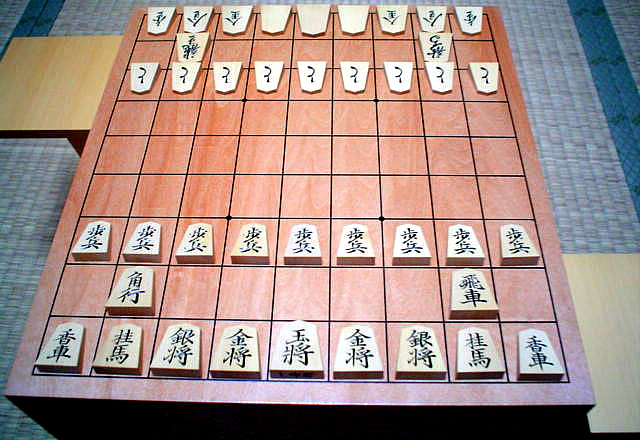
A traditional shōgi ban (shogi board) displaying a set of koma (pieces). The pieces on the far side are turned to show their promoted values. The stands on either side are komadai used to hold captured pieces. The board itself is raised for the comfort of players seated on tatami mats (background), and is hollowed underneath to produce a pleasing sound when the pieces are moved.

Two players face each other across a board composed of rectangles in a grid of 9 ranks (rows, 段) by 9 files (columns, 筋) yielding an 81-square board. (Note: Cf. the 64 square [8x8] board in western chess and the 90 intersection point board [9x10] in [xiangqi]).) In Japanese they are called Sente (先手; "earlier move") and Gote (後手; "later move"), but in English they are conventionally referred to as Black and White, with Black being the first player. (Note: The first player is called Black because moves from the first player are traditionally marked with a black triangle or pentagon (▲ or ☗) in Japanese shogi notation, while moves of the other player are marked with a white triangle or pentagon (△ or ☖). This is notably reversed from Western chess, where the player who moves first is called White and the other Black, but the same as in Go, where the first player usually plays with black stones.) The board is nearly always rectangular, and the rectangles are undifferentiated by marking or color. Pairs of dots mark the players' promotion zones.

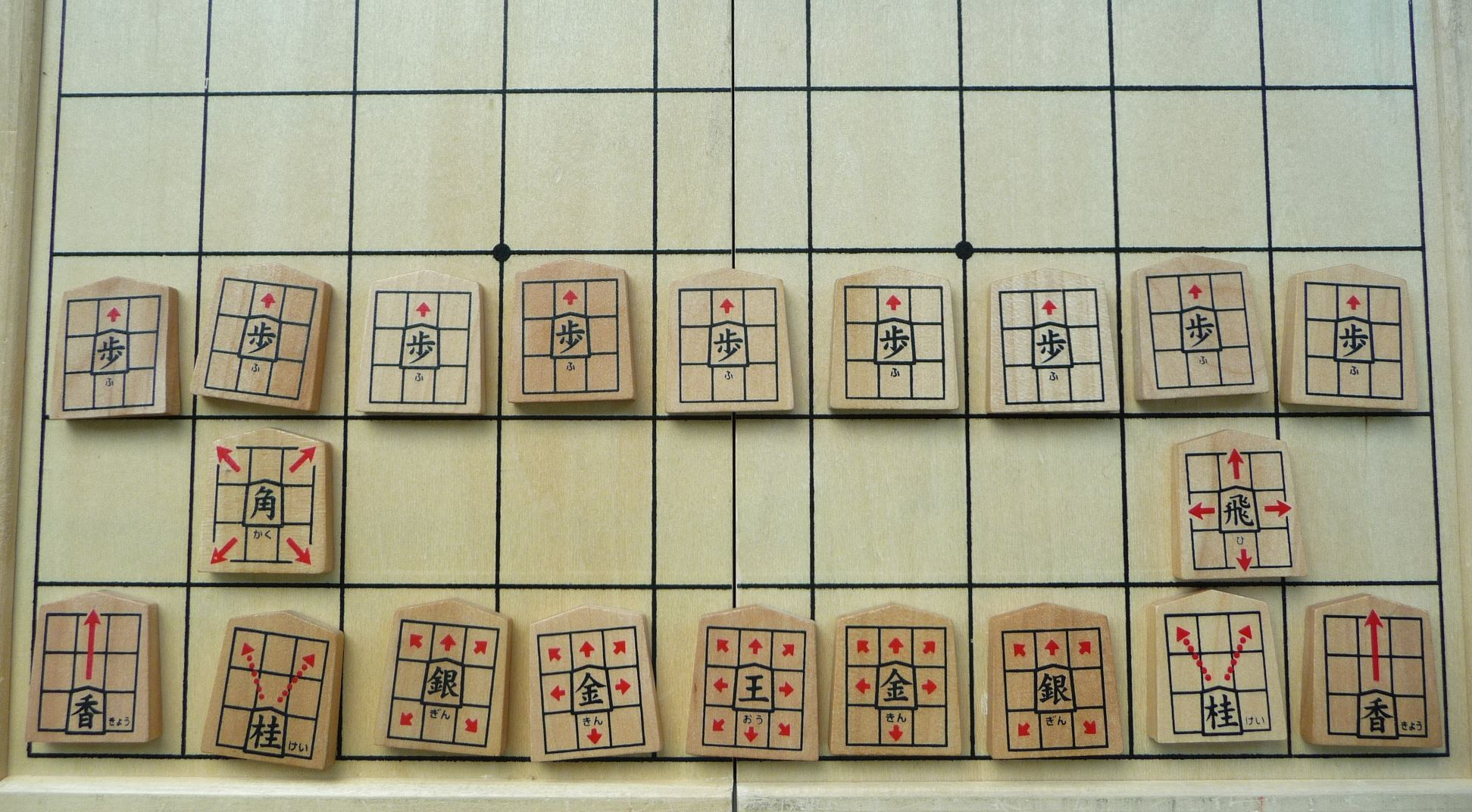
A set for beginners which shows the moves printed on the pieces

Each player has a set of 20 flat wedge-shaped pentagonal pieces of slightly different sizes. Except for the king, opposing pieces are undifferentiated by marking or color. Pieces face forward by having the pointed side of each piece oriented toward the opponent's side – this shows who controls the piece during play. The pieces from largest (most important) to smallest (least important) are:

- 1 king
- 1 rook
- 1 bishop
- 2 gold generals
- 2 silver generals
- 2 knights
- 2 lances
- 9 pawns

Several of these names were chosen to correspond to their rough equivalents in international chess, and not as literal translations of the Japanese names.

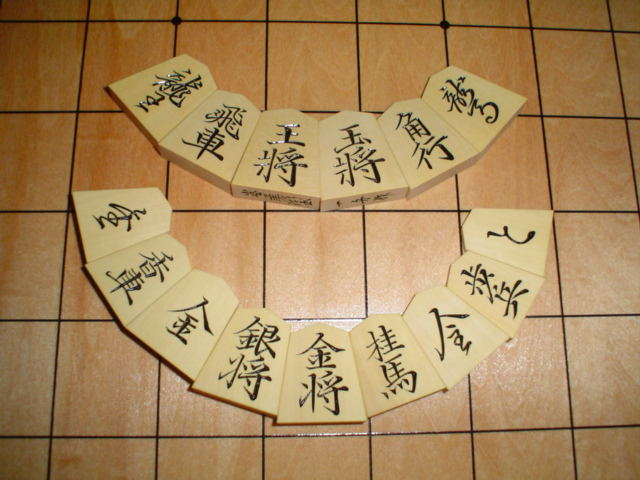
Closeup of shogi pieces. Top: +R, R, K (reigning), K (challenging), B, +B. Bottom: +L, L, +S, S, G, N, +N, P, +P

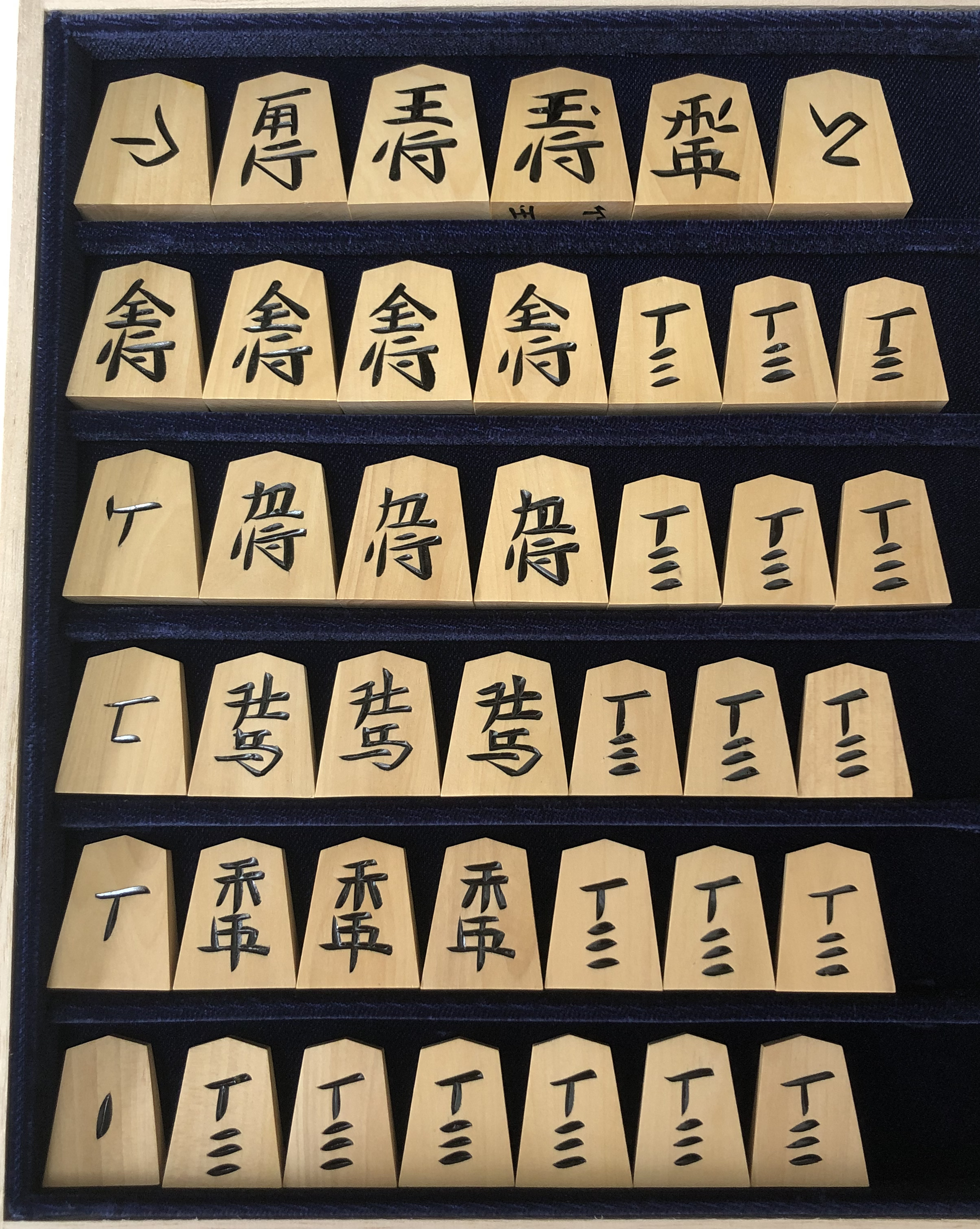
Pieces in the most simplified kurobori (黒彫) typeface

Each piece has its name written on its surface in the form of two kanji (Chinese characters used as syllabograms or as logograms to record texts in Old Japanese), usually in black ink. On the reverse side of each piece, other than the king and gold general, are one or two other characters, in amateur sets often in a different color (usually red); this side is turned face up during play to indicate that the piece has been promoted.

In some cases, the backsides of the King pieces (the narrow side which faces back toward the player during normal play) will display kanji containing additional information about the piece manufacturers.

The following is a table of the pieces with their Japanese representations and English equivalents. The abbreviations are used for game notation and often when referring to the pieces in speech in Japanese.

English name	Image	Kanji	Rōmaji	Meaning	Abbreviations			Betza notation
King (higher ranked player or reigning champion)		王将	ōshō	king general (Note: Originally both kings were named "jewelled general" (玉將), but at one point in history the dot in "jewel" (玉) was left out on one piece to make "king" (王). This is said to be introduced by the great warlord Toyotomi Hideyoshi in the 16th century.)	K	王	ō	K
King (lower ranked player or challenger)		玉将	gyokushō	jeweled general	K	玉	gyoku	K
Rook		飛車	hisha	flying chariot	R	飛	hi	R
Promoted rook ("Dragon")		竜王	ryūō	dragon king	+R	龍 or 竜 (Note: The kanji 竜 is a simplified form of 龍.)	ryū	FR
Bishop		角行	kakugyō	angle mover	B	角	kaku	B
Promoted bishop ("Horse")		竜馬	ryūma or ryūme	dragon horse	+B	馬	uma	WB
Gold general ("Gold")		金将	kinshō	gold general	G	金	kin	WfF
Silver general ("Silver")		銀将	ginshō	silver general	S	銀	gin	FfW
Promoted silver		成銀	narigin	promoted silver	+S	(全)	—	WfF
Knight		桂馬	keima	cassia horse (Note: Although sometimes translated as "katsura horse," the name keima is derived from a word for cassia (肉桂, nikkei), also known as "Chinese cinnamon," the bark of which is a spice that used to be very valuable in Japan, similar to jade, gold, silver, and incense.)	N	桂	kei	ffN
Promoted knight		成桂	narikei	promoted cassia	+N	(圭 or 今)	—	WfF
Lance		香車	kyōsha	incense chariot	L	香	kyō	fR
Promoted lance		成香	narikyō	promoted incense	+L	(杏 or 仝)	—	WfF
Pawn		歩兵	fuhyō	foot soldier	P	歩	fu	fW
Promoted pawn ("tokin")		と金	tokin	reaches gold	+P	と (or 个)	to	WfF

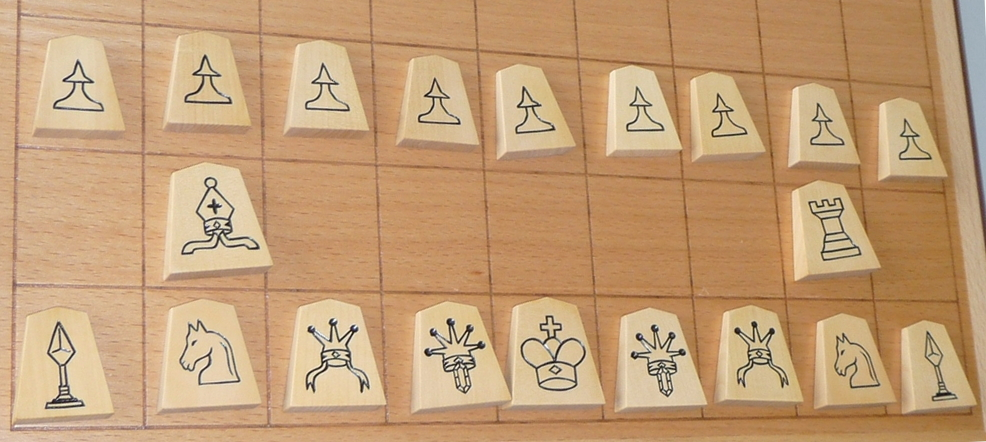
An example set of "international" pieces. In this set, those pieces that do not have their equivalents in chess have symbols that iconically show their movement (e.g. the silver general's crown and ribbons point towards its possible directions of movement).

English speakers sometimes refer to promoted bishops as horses and promoted rooks as dragons, after their Japanese names, and generally use the Japanese term tokin for promoted pawns. Silver generals and gold generals are commonly referred to simply as silvers and golds, respectively.

The characters inscribed on the reverse sides of the pieces to indicate promotion may be in red ink, and are usually cursive. The characters on the backs of the pieces that promote to gold generals are cursive variants of 金 'gold', becoming more cursive (more abbreviated) as the value of the original piece decreases. These cursive forms have these equivalents in print: 全 for promoted silver, 今 for promoted knight, 仝 for promoted lance, and 个 for promoted pawn (tokin). Another typographic convention has abbreviated versions of the original values, with a reduced number of strokes: 圭 for a promoted knight (桂), 杏 for a promoted lance (香), and the 全 as above for a promoted silver, but と (a hiragana symbol for the syllable "to") for tokin.

The suggestion that the Japanese characters have deterred Western players from learning shogi has led to the development of different "Westernized" or "international" pieces which use more recognizable western style chess symbols instead of characters. Other piece designs include representations of the piece movements along with the kanji. Most players soon learn to recognize the characters, however, partially because the traditional pieces are already iconic by size, with more powerful pieces being larger. Bilingual pieces with both Japanese characters and English captions or letters have also been developed as have pieces with animal cartoons.

== Setup and gameplay ==
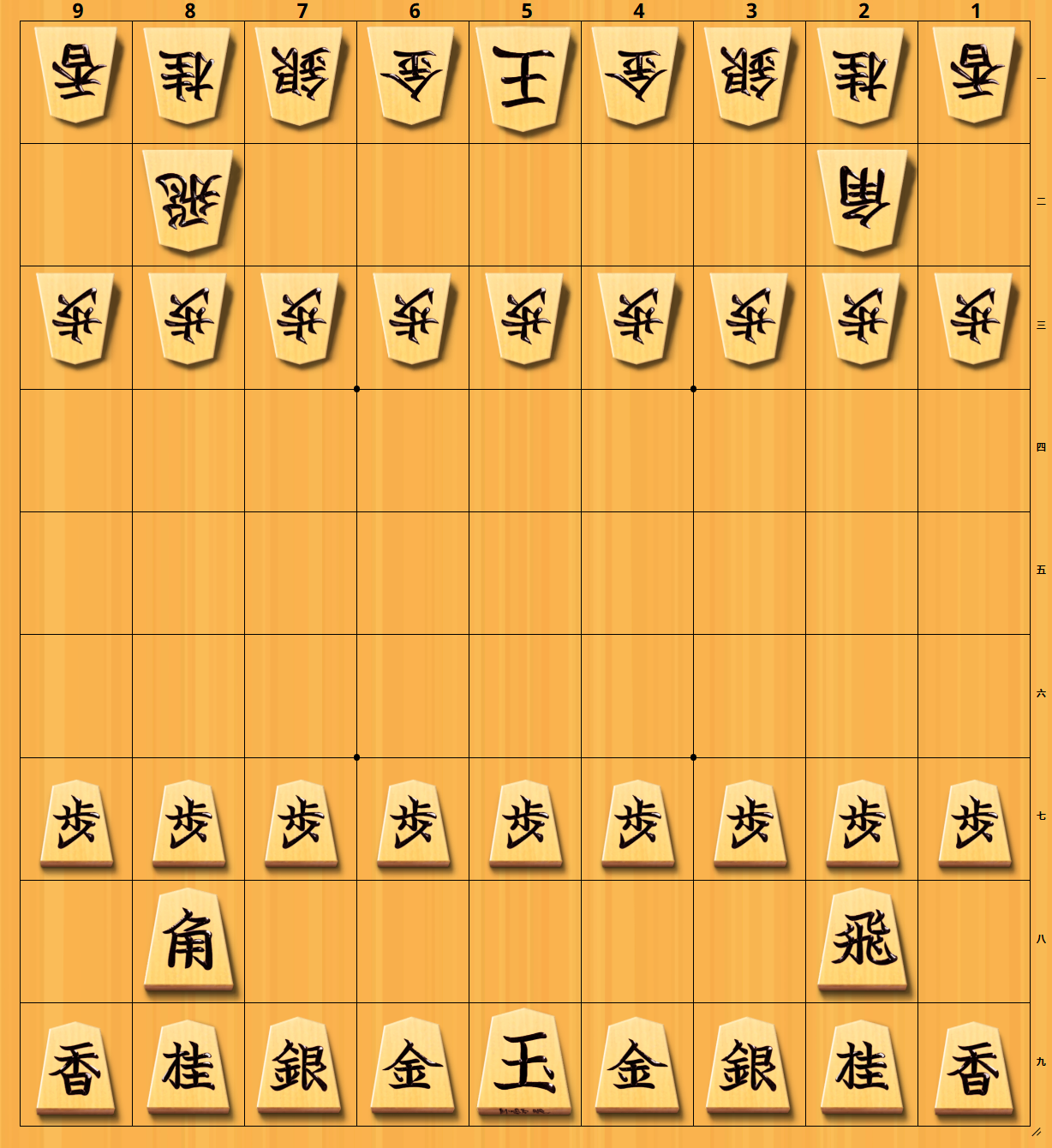
Shogi starting setup; Black (at bottom) moves first.

In a regular game, each player sets up friendly pieces facing forward (toward the opponent).

- In the rank nearest the player:
  - The king is placed in the center file;
  - The two gold generals are placed in files adjacent to the king;
  - The two silver generals are placed adjacent to each gold general;
  - The two knights are placed adjacent to each silver general;
  - The two lances are placed in the corners, adjacent to each knight.

That is, the first rank is

L	N	S	G	K	G	S	N	L

Or

香	桂	銀	金	玉	金	銀	桂	香

- In the second rank, each player places:
  - The bishop in the same file as the left knight;
  - The rook in the same file as the right knight.
- In the third rank, the nine pawns are placed one per file.

The arrangement differs in a handicap game depending on how many pieces are given up.

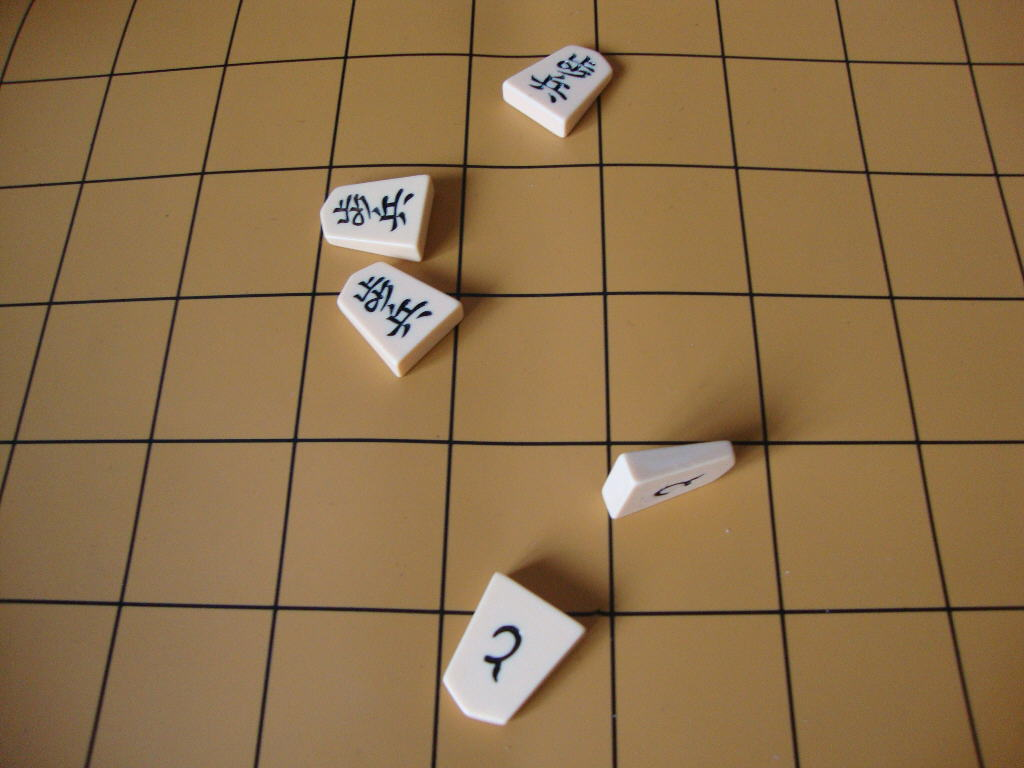
Deciding who goes first: Furigoma

A furigoma 振り駒 'piece toss' is used to decide who moves first. One of the players tosses five pawns. If the number of tokins (promoted pawns, と) facing up is higher than unpromoted pawns (歩), then the player who tossed the pawns plays gote 後手 'white' (that is, getting the second move).

After the piece toss furigoma, the game proceeds. If multiple games are played, then players alternate turns for who goes first in subsequent games. (The terms "Black" and "White" are used to differentiate sides although there is no difference in the color of the pieces.) For each turn, a player may either move a piece that is currently on the board (and potentially promote it, capture an opposing piece, or both) or else drop a piece that has been previously captured onto a square of the board. These options are explained below.

== Rules ==
=== Objective ===
The goal of the game is for one player to checkmate the other player's king, winning the game.

=== Movement ===
Most shogi pieces can move only to an adjacent square. A few may move across the board, and one jumps over intervening pieces. The "influence" (kiki) of a piece refers to the range over which its power extends on the board, corresponding to the squares to which it can move or on which it can attack.

The lance, bishop, and rook are ranging pieces: They can move any number of squares along a straight line limited only by intervening pieces and the edge of the board. If an opposing piece intervenes, it may be captured by removing it from the board and replacing it with the moving piece. If a friendly piece intervenes, the moving piece must stop short of that square; if the friendly piece is adjacent, the moving piece may not move in that direction at all.

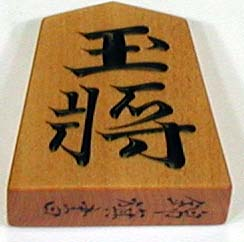
The king

○	○	○
○	玉	○
○	○	○

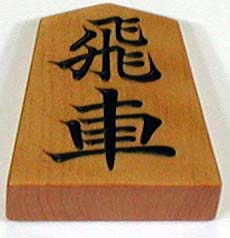
The rook

		│		
		│		
─	─	飛	─	─
		|		
		|		

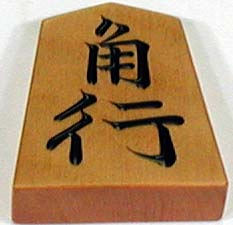
The bishop

╲				╱
	╲		╱	
		角		
	╱		╲	
╱				╲

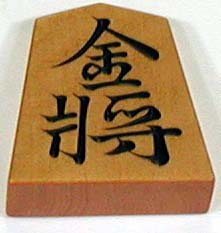
The gold general

○	○	○
○	金	○
	○	

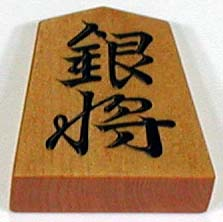
The silver general

○	○	○
	銀	
○		○

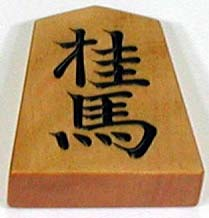
The knight

☆		☆
	桂	

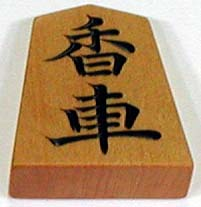
The lance

│
│
香

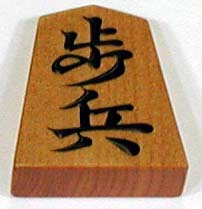
The pawn

○
歩

Notation
○	Steps to an adjacent square
☆	Jumps to a non-adjacent square, bypassing any intervening piece
│	Ranges along a straight line, crossing any number of empty squares
─	Ranges along a straight line, crossing any number of empty squares
╲	Ranges along a straight line, crossing any number of empty squares
╱	Ranges along a straight line, crossing any number of empty squares

A king (玉/王) moves one square in any direction, orthogonal or diagonal.

A rook (飛) moves any number of squares in an orthogonal direction.

A bishop (角) moves any number of squares in a diagonal direction. Because they cannot move orthogonally, the players' unpromoted bishops can reach only half the squares of the board, unless one is captured and then dropped.

A gold general (金) moves one square orthogonally, or one square diagonally forward, giving it six possible destinations. It cannot move diagonally backwards.

A silver general (銀) moves one square diagonally, or one square straight forward, giving it five possible destinations. Because an unpromoted silver can retreat more easily than a promoted one, it is common to leave a silver unpromoted at the far side of the board. (See Promotion).

A knight (桂) jumps at an angle intermediate to orthogonal and diagonal, amounting to one square straight forward plus one square diagonally forward, in a single move. Thus the knight has two possible forward destinations. Unlike international chess knights, shogi knights cannot move to the sides or in a backwards direction. The knight is the only piece that ignores intervening pieces on the way to its destination. It is not blocked from moving if the square in front of it is occupied, but neither can it capture a piece on that square. It is often useful to leave a knight unpromoted at the far side of the board. A knight must promote, however, if it reaches either of the two furthest ranks. (See Promotion.)

A lance (香) moves just like the rook except it cannot move backwards or to the sides. It is often useful to leave a lance unpromoted at the far side of the board. A lance must promote, however, if it reaches the furthest rank. (See Promotion.)

A pawn (歩) moves one square straight forward. It cannot retreat. Unlike international chess pawns, shogi pawns capture the same way as they move. A pawn must promote if it arrives at the furthest rank. (See Promotion.) In practice, however, a pawn is usually promoted whenever possible. There are two restrictions on where a pawn may be dropped. (See Drops.)

All pieces but the knight move either horizontally, vertically, or diagonally. These directions cannot be combined in a single move; one direction must be chosen.

Every piece blocks the movement of all other non-jumping pieces through the square it occupies.

If a piece occupies a legal destination for an opposing piece, it may be captured by removing it from the board and replacing it with the opposing piece. The capturing piece may not continue beyond that square on that turn. Shogi pieces capture the same as they move.

Normally, when moving a piece, a player snaps it to the board with the ends of the fingers of the same hand. This makes a sudden sound effect, bringing the piece to the attention of the opponent. This is also true for capturing and dropping pieces. On a traditional shogi-ban, the pitch of the snap is deeper, delivering a subtler effect.

=== Promotion ===
A player's
promotion zone (yellow)
☖ pieces in hand: –

9	8	7	6	5	4	3	2	1
									1
									2
									3
									4
									5
									6
歩	歩	歩	歩	歩	歩	歩	歩	歩	7
	角						飛		8
香	桂	銀	金	王	金	銀	桂	香	9

☗ pieces in hand: –

A player's promotion zone consists of the furthest one-third of the board – the three ranks occupied by the opponent's pieces at setup. The zone is typically delineated on shogi boards by two inscribed dots. When a piece is moved, if part of the piece's path lies within the promotion zone (that is, if the piece moves into, out of, or wholly within the zone; but not if it is dropped into the zone – see Drops), then the player has the option to promote the piece at the end of the turn. Promotion is indicated by turning the piece over after it moves, revealing the character of the promoted piece.

Promoting a piece is usually not compulsory; however, if a pawn or lance is moved to the furthest rank, or a knight is moved to either of the two furthest ranks, that piece must promote (otherwise, it would have no legal move on subsequent turns). A silver general is never required to promote, and it is often advantageous to keep a silver general unpromoted (it is easier, for example, to extract an unpromoted silver from behind enemy lines: a promoted silver, with only one line of retreat, can be easily blocked.) Rooks, bishops and pawns are almost always promoted, as these pieces do not lose any of their powers upon promotion.

Pieces that promote
☖ pieces in hand: –

9	8	7	6	5	4	3	2	1
									1
									2
									3
									4
									5
									6
と	と	と	と	と	と	と	と	と	7
	馬						龍		8
杏	圭	全				全	圭	杏	9

☗ pieces in hand: –

Promoting a piece changes the way it moves. The various pieces promote as follows:

- A silver general, knight, lance, or pawn has its normal power of movement replaced by that of a gold general.
- A rook or bishop keeps its original movement and gains the power to move one square in any direction (like a king). For a promoted bishop, this means it is able to reach any square on the board, given enough moves.
- A king or a gold general does not promote; nor can a piece that is already promoted.

When captured, a piece loses its promoted status. Otherwise promotion is permanent.

A promoted rook (literally dragon king (龍王 (ryūō)); shortened forms: 龍 (ryū) and 竜 (ryū)) moves as a rook and as a king. It is commonly referred to as dragon.

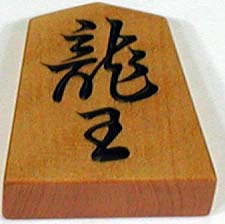
The dragon king

		│		
	○	│	○	
─	─	龍	─	─
	○	│	○	
		│		

A promoted bishop (literally dragon horse (龍馬 (ryūma)); shortened form 馬 (uma)) moves as a bishop and as a king. It is commonly referred to as horse.

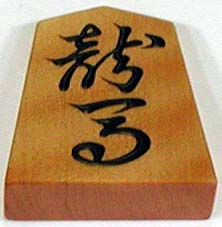
The dragon horse

╲				╱
	╲	○	╱	
	○	馬	○	
	╱	○	╲	
╱				╲

A promoted silver (成銀 narigin; alternate forms: 全, cursive 金), a promoted knight (成桂 narikei; alternate forms: 圭, 今, cursive 金), a promoted lance (成香 narikyō; alternate forms: 杏, 仝, cursive 金) and a promoted pawn (と金 tokin; alternate forms: と, 个) all move the same way as a gold general. The promoted pawn is often called by its Japanese name tokin, even by non-Japanese players.

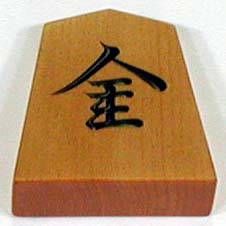
The promoted silver

○	○	○
○	全	○
	○	

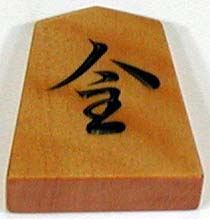
The promoted knight

○	○	○
○	圭	○
	○	

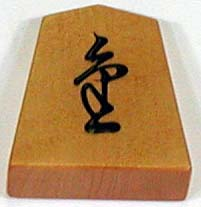
The promoted lance

○	○	○
○	杏	○
	○	

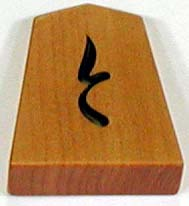
The promoted pawn

○	○	○
○	と	○
	○	

=== Drops ===
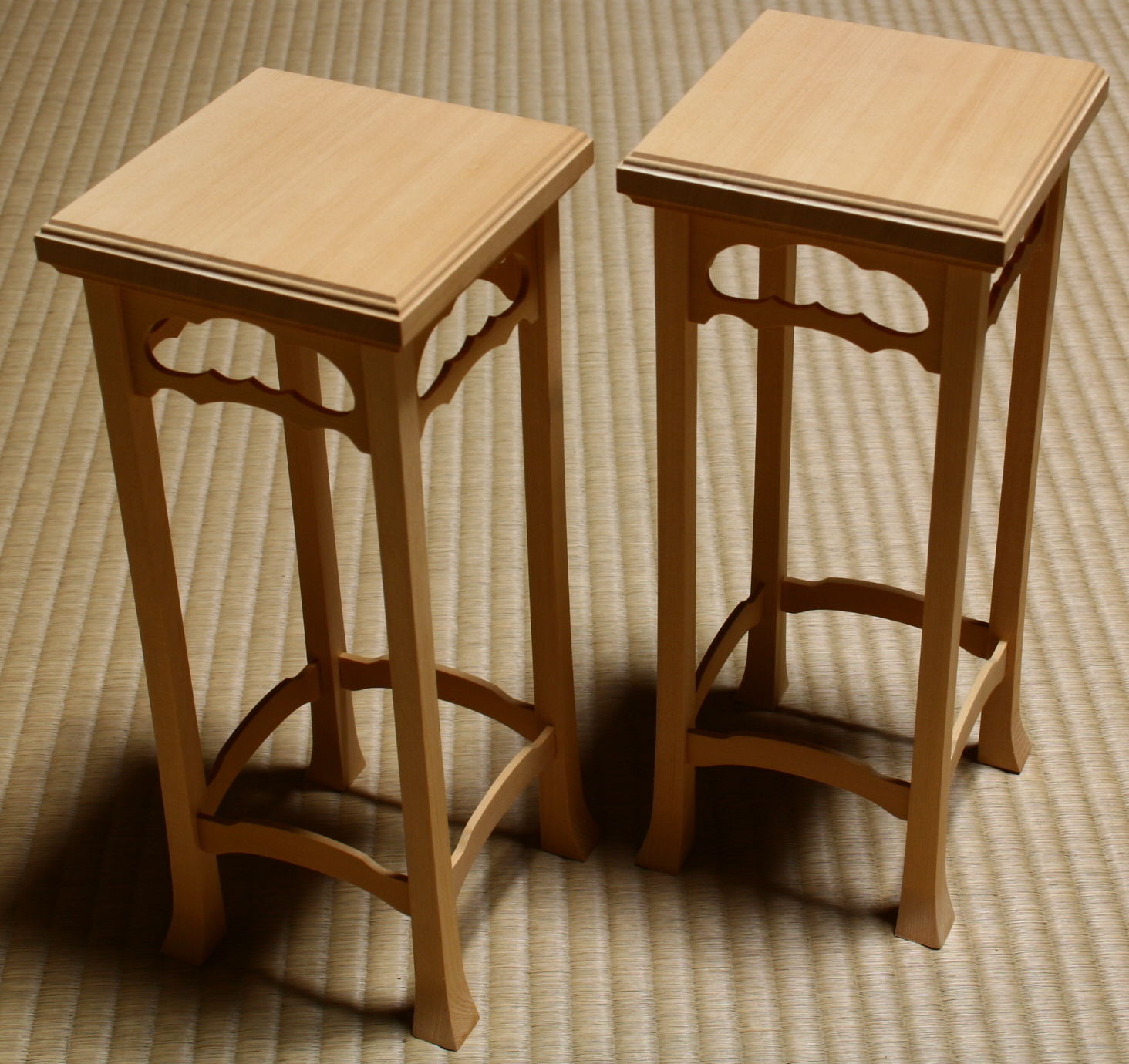
Traditional piece stands for pieces in hand

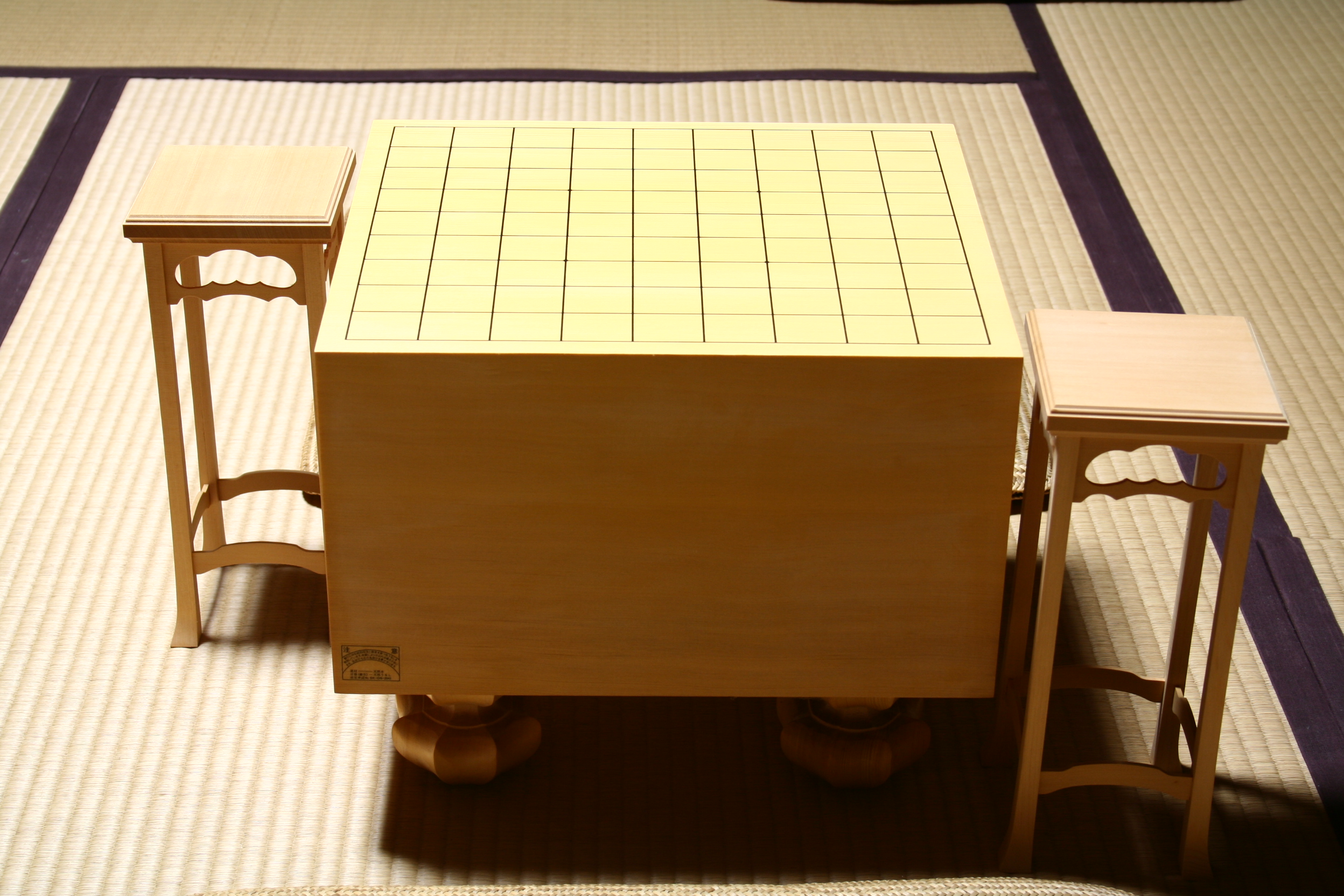
Piece stands next to shogi board

Captured pieces are retained in hand and can be brought back into play under the capturing player's control. The Japanese term for piece(s) in hand is either 持ち駒 mochigoma or 手駒 tegoma. On any turn, instead of moving a piece on the board, a player may select a piece in hand and place it – unpromoted side up and facing the opposing side – on any empty square. The piece is then one of that player's active pieces on the board and can be moved accordingly. This is called dropping the piece, or simply, a drop. A drop counts as a complete move.

A drop cannot capture a piece, nor does dropping within the promotion zone result in immediate promotion. Capture and/or promotion may occur normally, however, on subsequent moves of the piece.

There are three restrictions on dropping pieces; the last two of these apply only to pawns.

1. Piece with No Moves (Japanese: 行き所のない駒 ikidokorononaikoma): Pawns, lances and knights may not be dropped onto the last (9th) rank, and knights may not be dropped onto the penultimate (8th) rank; this is because such dropped pieces would have no legal moves on subsequent turns (as they can only move in the forward direction).
2. Two Pawns (Japanese: 二歩 nifu): A pawn may not be dropped onto a file (column) containing another unpromoted pawn of the same player (promoted pawns do not count).
3. Drop Pawn Mate (Japanese: 打ち歩詰め uchifuzume): A pawn may not be dropped to give an immediate checkmate. (This rule only applies specifically to pawns, drops and checkmates − to clarify, a player may deliver an immediate checkmate by dropping a non-pawn piece, a player may checkmate a king with a pawn that is already on the board, and a pawn may be dropped to give an immediate check as long as it does not also result in checkmate.)

A corollary of the second restriction is that a player with an unpromoted pawn on every file is unable to drop a pawn anywhere. For this reason, it is common to sacrifice a pawn in order to gain flexibility for drops.

Captured pieces are typically kept on a wooden stand (駒台 komadai) which is traditionally placed so that its bottom-left corner aligns with the bottom-right corner of the board from the perspective of each player. It is not permissible to hide pieces from full view.

It is common for players to swap bishops, which oppose each other across the board, early in the game. This leaves each player with a bishop in hand to be dropped later. The ability for drops in shogi gives the game tactical richness and complexity. The fact that no piece ever goes entirely out of play accounts for the rarity of draws.

=== Check ===
When a player's move threatens to capture the opposing king on the next turn, the move is said to give check to the king and the king is said to be in check. If a player's king is in check, that player's responding move must remove the check. Ways to remove a check include moving the king away from the threat, capturing the threatening piece, or placing another interposing piece between the king and the threatening piece.

To announce check in Japanese, one can say ōte (王手), however, this is an influence of international chess and is not required, even as a courtesy. It may be common to announce ōte in beginner matches or for local rules to dictate that you have to announce it. Announcing a check vocally is unheard of in competitive tournaments.

=== End of the game ===
The usual way for shogi games to end is for one side to checkmate the other side's king, after which the losing player will be given the opportunity to admit defeat. Unlike western chess or xiangqi, checkmate is almost always the result in shogi since pieces never retire from play, which gives the players a sufficient number of pieces to deliver checkmate. That said, there are three other possible ways for a game to end: repetition (千日手 sennichite), impasse (持将棋 jishōgi), and an illegal move (反則手 hansokute). The first two – repetition and impasse – are particularly uncommon. Illegal moves are also uncommon in professional games although this may not be true with amateur players (especially beginners).

Unlike western chess, there is no tradition of offering a mutual draw by agreement.

Game End	Win State
Checkmate	Loss
Resignation	Loss
Illegal move	Loss
Repetition	Draw
Impasse	Draw (usually)
Time forfeit	Loss

==== Checkmate ====
Checkmate by Black
☖ pieces in hand: –

9	8	7	6	5	4	3	2	1
王									1
金									2
									3
		角							4
									5
									6
									7
									8
									9

☗ pieces in hand: –
The most common basic checkmating patterns involve golds. This mating move is called "Gold on the Head." It is the solution to the most basic of mating problems.

If the king is in check and there is no possible move which could protect the king, the move is said to checkmate (tsumi 詰み) the king. Checkmate effectively means that the opponent wins the game as the player would have no remaining legal moves. (See also: tsumeshogi, hisshi.)

==== Resignation ====
The losing player will usually resign when the situation is thought to be hopeless and may declare the resignation at any time during their turn. Although a player may resign just after they are checkmated, playing up to the checkmate point rarely occurs in practice as players normally resign as soon as a loss is deemed inevitable. Similarly, if a player were to lose in an Entering King situation (see section below) by having less than 24 points (or by any of the other Impasse rules used by amateurs), then the player will usually resign before that point.

In traditional tournament play, a formal resignation is required – that is, a checkmate is not a sufficient condition for winning. The resignation is indicated by bowing and/or saying 'I lost' (負けました makemashita) and/or placing the right hand over the piece stands. Placing the hand over the piece stand is a vestige of an older practice of gently dropping one's pieces in hand over the board in order to indicate resignation. In western practice, a handshake may be used.

==== Infractions ====
In professional and serious (tournament) amateur games, a player who makes an infraction, such as an illegal move, loses immediately. (Note: This is in contrast to western chess, which usually allows moves to be corrected with sometimes a less severe consequence of time penalty. However, the rules are complex. Cf. Rules of chess § Illegal move.) This rule also includes other types of infractions besides illegal moves. The loss stands even if play continued and the move was discovered later in game. However, if neither the opponent nor a third party points out the illegal move and the opponent later resigned, the resignation stands as the result.

According to the Game Regulations set down in the General Meeting of Professional Players of the Japan Shogi Association held in 2024, the infractions leading to immediate game loss are the following:

Toyokawa's televised Two Pawns
☖ pieces in hand: 角桂歩歩

9	8	7	6	5	4	3	2	1
香	桂		銀				龍		1
	王	銀							2
	歩		歩				歩		3
歩		歩	銀						4
				香			歩		5
歩		歩		歩		歩		歩	6
	歩		歩	銀		圭			7
		玉	金	金		角	龍		8
香	桂				金		歩	香	9

☗ pieces in hand: 金歩歩
- Violating the Two Pawns (nifu) restriction (See §Drops above.)
- Violating the Drop Pawn Mate (uchifuzume) restriction
- Dropping or moving a piece to position where it cannot move (such as dropping a knight to an opponent's last two ranks, etc.)
- Dropping a piece with its promoted value
- Playing out of turn, e.g. making more than one move or white moving first instead of moving second or moving twice in succession.
- Making perpetual check four times (cf. sennichite)
- Leaving one's king in check, or moving one's king into check
- Moving a piece contrary to how its movements are defined (for example, moving a gold like a silver, or moving an unpromoted bishop off its legal diagonal)
- Taking back a move after its completion (matta)
- Time forfeiture (failing to complete a move within the allotted main time or countdown).
- Stopping the clock before completing a move.
- Receiving advice from another person or analyzing the game on another board.
- Any other move impossible under the rules of shogi.
- Failure to comply with the arbiter’s ruling.

In friendly amateur games, this rule is sometimes relaxed, and the player may be able to take back the illegal move and replay a new legal move.

In particular, the Two Pawn violation is the most common illegal move played by professional players. The Two Pawn violation played by Takahiro Toyokawa (against Kōsuke Tamura) in the 2004 NHK Cup is infamous since it was broadcast on television. On the 109th move, Toyokawa (playing as Black) dropped a pawn to the 29 square while he already had a pawn in play on the board on the 23 square and, thus, lost the game.

==== Repetition (draw) ====
If the same game position occurs four times with the same player to move and the same pieces in hand for each player, then the game ends in a repetition draw (千日手 sennichite, lit. "moves for a thousand days"), as long as the positions are not due to perpetual check. Perpetual check (連続王手の千日手) is an illegal move (see above), which ends the game in a loss in tournament play.

In professional shogi, a repetition draw outcome is not a final result as draws essentially do not count. Each game can only end in either a win or loss. (Note: This is a significant difference from western chess, in which a player can play specifically to obtain draws for gaining points.) In the case of a repetition draw, professional shogi players will have to immediately play a subsequent game (or as many games as necessary) with sides reversed in order to obtain a true win outcome. (That is, the player who was White becomes Black, and vice versa.) Also, depending on the tournament, professional players play the subsequent game in the remainder of the allowed game time.

Thus, aiming for a repetition draw may be a possible professional strategy for the White player in order to play the second replay game as Black, which has a slight statistical advantage and/or greater initiative. For instance, Bishop Exchange Fourth File Rook is a passive strategy for White with the goal of a repetition draw (as it requires two tempo losses – swinging the rook and trading the bishops) while it is a very aggressive strategy if played by Black.

Repetition draws are rare in professional shogi occurring in about 1–2% of games and even rarer in amateur games. In professional shogi, repetition draws usually occur in the opening as certain positions are reached that are theoretically disadvantaged for both sides (reciprocal zugzwang). In amateur shogi, repetition draws tend to occur in the middle or endgame as a result of player errors.

==== Impasse ====
The game reaches an Impasse or Deadlock (持将棋 jishōgi) if both kings have advanced into their respective promotion zones – a situation known as 相入玉 (ai-nyū gyoku "double entering kings") – and neither player can hope to mate the other or to gain any further material. An Impasse can result in either a win or a draw. If an Impasse happens, the winner is decided as follows: each player agrees to an Impasse, then each rook or bishop, promoted or not, scores 5 points for the owning player, and all other pieces except kings score 1 point each. A player scoring fewer than 24 points loses. (Note that in the start position, both players have 27 points each.) If neither player has fewer than 24, the game is no contest – a draw. In professional shogi, an Impasse result is always a draw since a player that cannot obtain the 24 points will simply resign. Jishōgi is considered an outcome in its own right rather than no contest, but there is no practical difference. As an Impasse needs to be agreed on for the rule to be invoked, a player may refuse to do so and attempt to win the game in future moves. If that happens, there is no official rule about the verdict of the game.

However, in amateur shogi, there are different practices most of which force a win resolution to the Impasse in order to avoid a draw result.

The first draw by Impasse occurred in 1731 in a bishop handicap game between the seventh Lifetime Meijin, Sōkan Itō II, and his brother, Sōkei Ōhashi.

===== Entering King =====
Black's king in an Entering King state
☖ pieces in hand: 角 銀 桂 香

9	8	7	6	5	4	3	2	1
王	桂	金					玉		1
香	銀	金		と	と	と	馬		2
	歩	歩	歩	と		歩	歩	歩	3
歩				歩	歩				4
	歩	歩					飛	飛	5
歩		金	銀	歩		歩			6
		桂							7
									8
香									9

☗ pieces in hand: 金 銀 桂 香

As a practical matter, when an opponent's king has entered a player's own territory especially with supporting defending pieces, the opponent's king is often very difficult to mate given the forward attacking nature of most shogi pieces. This state is referred to as entering king (入玉 nyū gyoku). If both players' kings are in entering king states, the game becomes more likely to result in an impasse.

In the adjacent diagram example, although White's king is in a strong Bear-in-the-hole castle, Black's king has entered White's territory making it very difficult to mate. Therefore, this position favors Black.

Kimura vs Toyoshima 2019
☖ pieces in hand: 桂_{1} 歩_{4}

9	8	7	6	5	4	3	2	1
馬			馬	歩					1
					銀	金			2
歩			桂	歩	桂	銀		歩	3
				龍	歩		歩		4
						歩			5
歩		歩	歩			金			6
	歩	銀					王		7
	玉	金	金		歩		全		8
香	桂					飛	杏		9

☗ pieces in hand: 香_{2} 歩_{2}
After 150 moves.
Kimura vs Toyoshima 2019
☖ pieces in hand: 金_{1} 銀_{1} 桂_{2} 歩_{3}

9	8	7	6	5	4	3	2	1
	馬								1
	玉	馬							2
	銀	と				龍			3
歩			歩		歩			金	4
	龍			金			香		5
									6
					と	と			7
				金			全	香	8
							杏	王	9

☗ pieces in hand: 銀_{1} 桂_{2} 香_{1} 歩_{9}
After 285 moves.

An example of Entering King occurred in the fourth game of the 60th Ōi title match between Masayuki Toyoshima and Kazuki Kimura held on August 20–21, 2019. After being unsuccessful in attacking Kimura and also in defending his own king within his camp, Toyoshima (playing as White) moved his king away from Kimura's attacking pieces by fleeing up the second file, ultimately entering his king into Kimura's camp by move 150. Although Toyoshima had achieved Entering King, he still had only 23 points—one point shy of the required 24 points for an Impasse draw—while Kimura (Black) had 31 points. Toyoshima then spent the next 134 moves trying to bring his point total, which fluctuated between 17 and 23, up to the necessary 24. By the 231st move, the game had reached a Double Entering Kings state, and by move 285 Kimura had successfully kept Toyoshima's point total at bay. Here, Toyoshima with 20 points (and Kimura at 34 points) resigned. Incidentally, this game broke the record of longest game in a title match.

===== Amateur resolutions =====
For amateur games, there are various guidances with little standardization. Fairbairn reports a practice in the 1980s (considered a rule by the now defunct Shogi Association for The West) where the dispute is resolved by either player moving all friendly pieces into the promotion zone and then the game ends with points tallied.

Another resolution is the 27-Point (27点法) rule used for some amateur tournaments. One version of this is simply the player who has 27 or more points is the winner of the Impasse. Another version is a 27-Point Declaration rule. For instance, the Declaration rule on the online shogi site, 81Dojo, is that the player who wants to declare an Impasse win must (i) declare an intention to win via Impasse, (ii) have the king in the enemy camp (the promotion zone for that player), (iii) 10 other pieces must be in the promotion zone, (iv) not be in check, (v) have time remaining, and (vi) must have 28 points if Black or 27 points if White. If all of these conditions are met, then the Impasse declarer will win the game regardless of whether the opponent objects.

Yet another resolution to Impasse is the so-called Try Rule (トライルール torairūru). In this case, after both kings have entered their corresponding promotion zones, then the player who first moves the king to the opponent's king's start square (51 for Black, 59 for White) first will be the winner. As an example, the popular 将棋ウォーズ (Shogi Wars) app by HEROZ Inc. used the Try Rule up until 2014. (Now the app uses a variant of the 27-Point Declaration Rule – although it differs from the variant used on the 81Dojo site.) The idea of the "Try Rule" was taken from rugby football (see Try (rugby)).

==== Draws in tournaments ====
Impasse position of Katoh vs Nakahara 1982
☖ pieces in hand: 銀_{1} 桂_{2} 香_{2} 歩_{7}

9	8	7	6	5	4	3	2	1
杏				と					1
	玉			龍					2
		馬							3
	金	香				と			4
					馬				5
		と				圭	歩		6
			金	と			金	全	7
						王	銀		8
				龍				圭	9

☗ pieces in hand: 金_{1} 銀_{1} 歩_{6}
Katoh played +N-36, and Nakahara then agreed to a draw via impasse. Katoh has 29 points, Nakahara 25 points.

In professional tournaments, the rules typically require drawn games to be replayed with sides reversed, possibly with reduced time limits. They are rare compared to chess and xiangqi, occurring at a rate of 2 to 3%.

The 1982 Meijin title match between Makoto Nakahara and Hifumi Katoh was unusual in this regard with an impasse draw in the first (Double Fortress or Double Yagura) game on April 13–14 (only the fifth draw in the then 40-year history of the tournament). This game (with Katoh as Black) lasted for 223 moves with 114 minutes spent pondering a single move. One of the reasons for the length of this game was that White (Nakahara) was very close to falling below the minimum of 24 points required for a draw. Thus, the end of the endgame was strategically about trying to keep White's points above the 24-point threshold. In this match, sennichite occurred in the sixth and eighth games. Thus, this best-of-seven match lasted eight games and took over three months to finish; Black did not lose a single game and the eventual victor was Katoh at 4–3.

=== Time control ===
Professional games are timed as in international chess, but professional shogi players are almost never expected to keep time in their games. Instead a timekeeper is assigned, typically an apprentice professional. Time limits are much longer than in international chess (9 hours a side plus extra time in the prestigious Meijin title match), and in addition byōyomi (literally "second counting") is employed. This means that when the ordinary time has run out, the player will from that point on have a certain amount of time to complete every move (a byōyomi period), typically upwards of one minute. The final ten seconds are counted down, and if the time expires the player to move loses the game immediately. Amateurs often play with electronic clocks that beep out the final ten seconds of a byōyomi period, with a prolonged beep for the last five.

== Player rank and handicaps ==
Amateur players are ranked from 15 kyū to 1 kyū and then from 1 dan to 8 dan. Amateur 8 dan was previously only honorarily given to famous people. While it is now possible to win amateur 8 dan by actual strength (winning amateur Ryu-oh 3 times), this has yet to be achieved.

Professional players operate with their own scale, from 6 kyū to 3 dan for pro-aspiring players and professional 4 dan to 9 dan for formal professional players. Amateur and professional ranks are offset (with amateur 4 dan being equivalent to professional 6 kyū).

=== Handicaps ===
6-Piece Handicap
☖ pieces in hand: –

9	8	7	6	5	4	3	2	1
		銀	金	王	金	銀			1
									2
歩	歩	歩	歩	歩	歩	歩	歩	歩	3
									4
									5
									6
歩	歩	歩	歩	歩	歩	歩	歩	歩	7
	角						飛		8
香	桂	銀	金	玉	金	銀	桂	香	9

☗ pieces in hand: –

Shogi has a handicap system (like go) in which games between players of disparate strengths are adjusted so that the stronger player is put in a more disadvantageous position in order to compensate for the difference in playing levels. In a handicap game, one or more of White's pieces are removed from the setup, and instead White plays first. In handicap games, the stronger handicapped player is called uwate (upper player), and the other is called shitate (lower player). The upper player moves first.

Depending on the difference in strength, handicap setups range from removing one or two pieces up to a ten-piece handicap, in which the Rook and Bishop are removed in addition to Golds, Silvers, Knights, and Lances. The imbalance created by this method of handicapping is not as strong as it is in western chess because material advantage is not as decisive in shogi.

== Notation ==
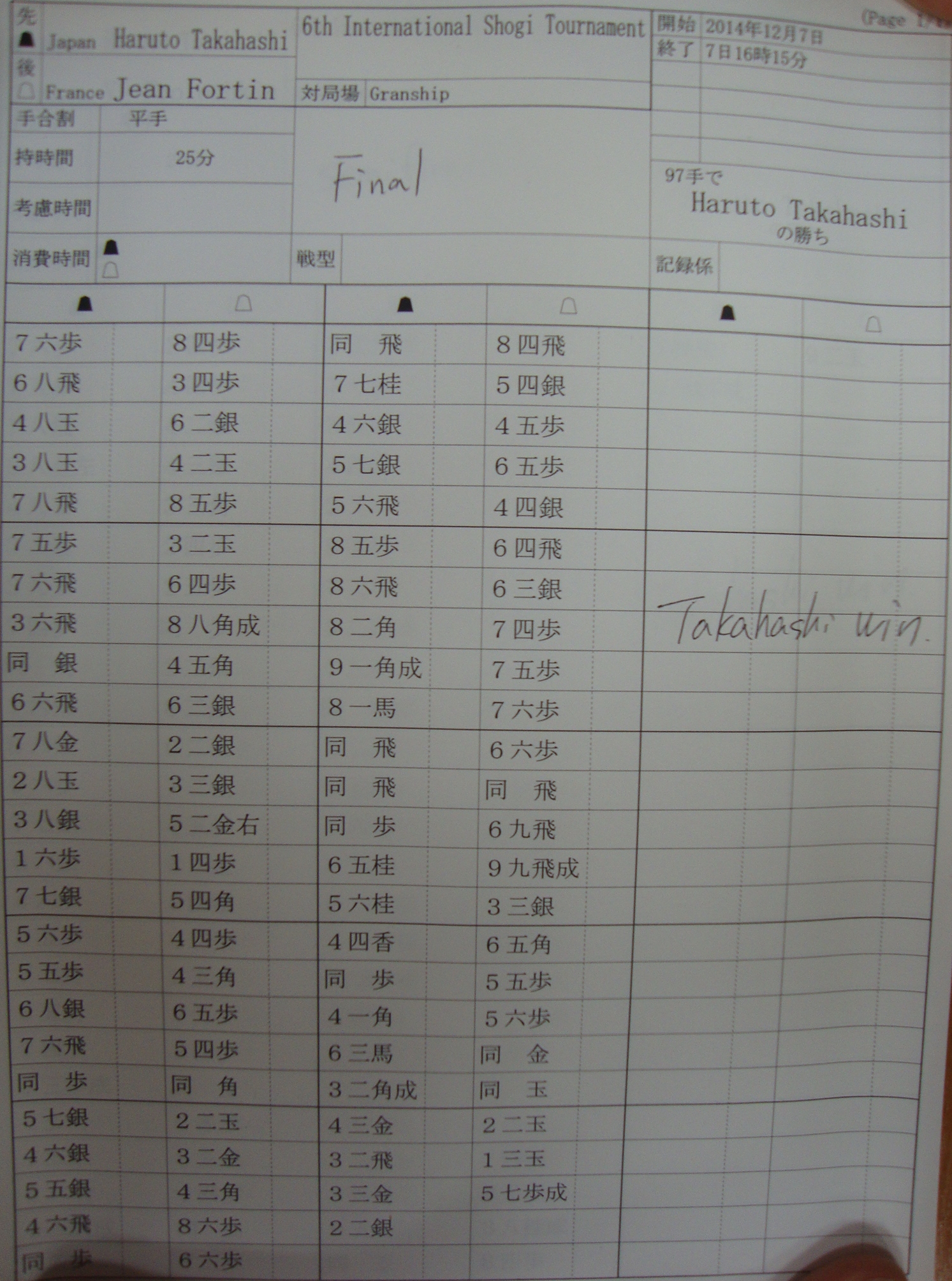
A shogi game record

There are two common systems used to notate piece movements in shogi game records. One is used in Japanese language texts while a second was created for western players by George Hodges and Glyndon Townhill in the English language. This system was updated by Hosking to be closer to the Japanese standard (two numerals). Other systems are used to notate shogi board positions. Unlike chess, the origin (11 square) is at the top right of a printed position rather than the bottom left.

In western piece movement notation, the format is the piece initial followed by the type of movement and finally the file and rank where the piece moved to. The piece initials are K (King), R (Rook), B (Bishop), G (Gold), S (Silver), N (Knight), L (Lance), and P (Pawn). Simple movement is indicated with -, captures with x, and piece drops with *. The files are indicated with numerals 1–9. The older Hodges standard used letters a–i for ranks, and the newer Hosking standard also uses numerals 1–9 for the ranks. Thus, Rx24 indicates 'rook captures on 24'. Promoted pieces are notated with + prefixed to the piece initial (e.g. +Rx24). Piece promotion is also indicated with + (e.g. S-21+) while unpromotion is indicated with = (e.g. S-21=). Piece ambiguity is resolved by notating which square a piece is moving from (e.g. N65-53+ means 'knight from 65 moves to 53 and promotes,' which distinguishes it from N45-53+).

The Japanese notation system uses Japanese characters for pieces and promotion indication and uses Japanese numerals instead of letters for ranks. Movement type aside from drops is not indicated, and the conventions for resolving ambiguity are quite different from the western system. As examples, the western Rx24 would be 2四飛 in Japanese notation, +Rx24 would be 2四龍, S-21+ would be 2一銀成, S-21= would be 2一銀不成, and N65-53+ would be 5三桂左成 showing that the leftmost knight jumped (implicitly from the 65 square), which distinguishes it from 5三桂右成 in which the rightmost knight jumped. However, it is becoming common to use Arabic numerals for both files and ranks, for example 24飛 or 21銀成.

Although not strictly part of the notational calculus for games, game results are indicated in Japanese newspapers, websites, etc. with wins indicated by a white circle and losses indicated by a black circle.

== Strategy and tactics ==
Like chess, a shogi game can be divided into the opening, middle game and endgame, each requiring a different strategy. While they share names, these three phases significantly differ from those in FIDE chess.

=== Opening ===
Static Rook
☖ pieces in hand: –

9	8	7	6	5	4	3	2	1
									1
									2
									3
									4
							歩		5
									6
歩	歩	歩	歩	歩	歩	歩		歩	7
	角						飛		8
香	桂	金	銀	玉	金	銀	桂	香	9

☗ pieces in hand: –
Ranging Rook
☖ pieces in hand: –

9	8	7	6	5	4	3	2	1
									1
									2
									3
									4
		歩							5
									6
歩	歩		歩	歩	歩	歩	歩	歩	7
	角	飛							8
香	桂	金	銀	玉	金	銀	桂	香	9

☗ pieces in hand: –

The opening (jōban) consists of arranging one's defenses, usually in a castle and positioning for attack. This phase ends when the armies begin to engage. There are numerous formations and strategies (senpō) that have been devised over time. For each strategy, several move sequences (jōseki) and their variations have been studied. Basic shogi strategy is also often taught with shogi proverbs or maxims, short phrases that communicate basic strategic theme and advice. When it comes to the opening, some examples of common proverbs include:

- Avoid a Sitting King: the king must either be moved from its starting square into a defensive formation or a structure must be erected around the king to protect it.
- Don't Put King and Rook Close Together: position the king away from the rook (a key offensive piece), otherwise, the king will be in the center of the battle and both pieces may be forked, pinned or skewered.
- Don't Put the King on the Bishop's Diagonal: Since the bishop is a major offensive piece, placing one's king on the bishop's diagonal opens it up to future attack.

Opening strategies often divide the board into left and right sectors, constructing an attacking formation on one side and a defensive formation on the other. The basic distinction between shogi openings is based on the rook's position. In Static Rook (ibisha) strategies, the rook is kept on the right side which becomes the attacking side of the board, while the king is moved to the defending left side. In Ranging Rook (furibisha) strategies, the rook is moved to the left side or the center of the board for attack, while the right side is retained for defense. If both players chose the same type of strategy, then the games are usually called Double Static Rook (aiibisha) or Double Ranging Rook (aifuribisha). If different strategy types are chosen, then the games are categories as either Static Rook vs Ranging Rook (ibisha tai furibisha) or Ranging Rook vs Static Rook (furibisha tai ibisha). Whatever the case, most strategies aim to establish a formation centered on the major pieces (rook and bishop) on the attacking side in order to break through the opponent’s defense. Meanwhile on the defensive side, the king is moved to the flank on the opposite side of the rook, and a castle is constructed using generals and other minor pieces not employed in the attack. These basic guidelines are not fixed however, and other strategies intentionally depart from them.

Ranging Rook vs Static Rook
☖ pieces in hand: –

9	8	7	6	5	4	3	2	1
香	桂					金	桂	王	1
	飛					金	銀	香	2
歩		歩	歩	銀	歩	角	歩	歩	3
	歩			歩		歩			4
									5
		歩	歩		歩	歩	歩	歩	6
歩	歩		銀	歩	金		銀		7
	角		飛			金	玉		8
香	桂						桂	香	9

☗ pieces in hand: –
Anaguma castle Static Rook by white against High Mino Castle 4th File Ranging Rook by black

In the adjacent diagram, sente ("black" at the bottom of the board) has chosen a Ranging Rook position (specifically Fourth File Rook) where the rook has been moved leftward away from its starting position. Additionally, sente is using a Mino castle (silver crown castle), which is a type of fortification structure constructed with one silver and two gold pieces and the king moved inside of the fortification (the silver crown name comes from the silver being positioned directly above the king's head on the 27 square as if it were a crown). In the diagram, gote ("white") has chosen a Static Rook position, in which the rook remains on its starting square. This Static Rook position is specifically a type of Counter-Ranging Rook position known as Anaguma Static Rook that uses an Anaguma castle. The Anaguma (badger) castle has the king moved all the way into very edge corner of the board on the 11 square as if it were a badger in a hole with a silver moved to the 22 square in order to close up the hole and additional reinforcing golds on 31 and 32 squares. This board position required 33 moves (or 12 move pairs as counted in western chess) to construct.

=== Middle game ===
The middle game (chūban) lasts from the beginning of direct engagement until the defensive structure (castle) of one side begins to collapse. Strategies focus on attempting to break through the opposing defenses and penetrate the enemy camp while maintaining one's own defenses. Since accumulating pieces in hand is essential for checkmating, capturing pieces and establishing a foothold within the enemy territory are the key aims of the middle game. Some classic proverbs for going on the offensive include:

- Begin your attack with a sacrifice Pawn push: many attacks begin with a pawn sacrifice, which allows further piece development and counterattacks.
- If there is an unprotected piece, you won't be stuck for a move: look for undefended pieces (ukigome) or hanging pieces
- Attack with Rook, Bishop, Silver and Knight: these are the standard pieces used for the offensive
- The knight that jumps far falls prey to a pawn: unlike in chess, the shogi knight cannot move backwards, so one must be very careful in launching deep attacks with it, lest it be easily taken by the enemy.
- Drop the Lance on the back rank: When dropping a lance, it makes more sense to drop it as far back as possible, this maximizes its coverage.
- A silver at the head of the (opponent's) Knight is the standard move (joseki): refers to how dropping a silver right in front of a knight is a powerful move.

As for the defense, it is important to prevent the opponent from infiltrating one’s castle or defensive structure. One proverb states: "defend against major pieces by drawing them closer". This proverb states that a good way to defend against a major piece is to drop or move a piece in the way of its attack and draw it closer to your forces, where it can then be more easily attacked. The degree to which a player emphasizes attack or defense is reflected in their unique playing style. Since exchanges are common, calculating the balance of captured pieces in hand is important.

In some cases, intense play aimed directly at the kings begins before the forming of castles and formations has been completed. In these cases, one may consider the middle game as having been skipped altogether. Alternatively, a decisive imbalance may arise during the middle game, which may lead an experienced player to calculate their position as hopeless and thus to resign before entering the endgame.

=== Endgame ===
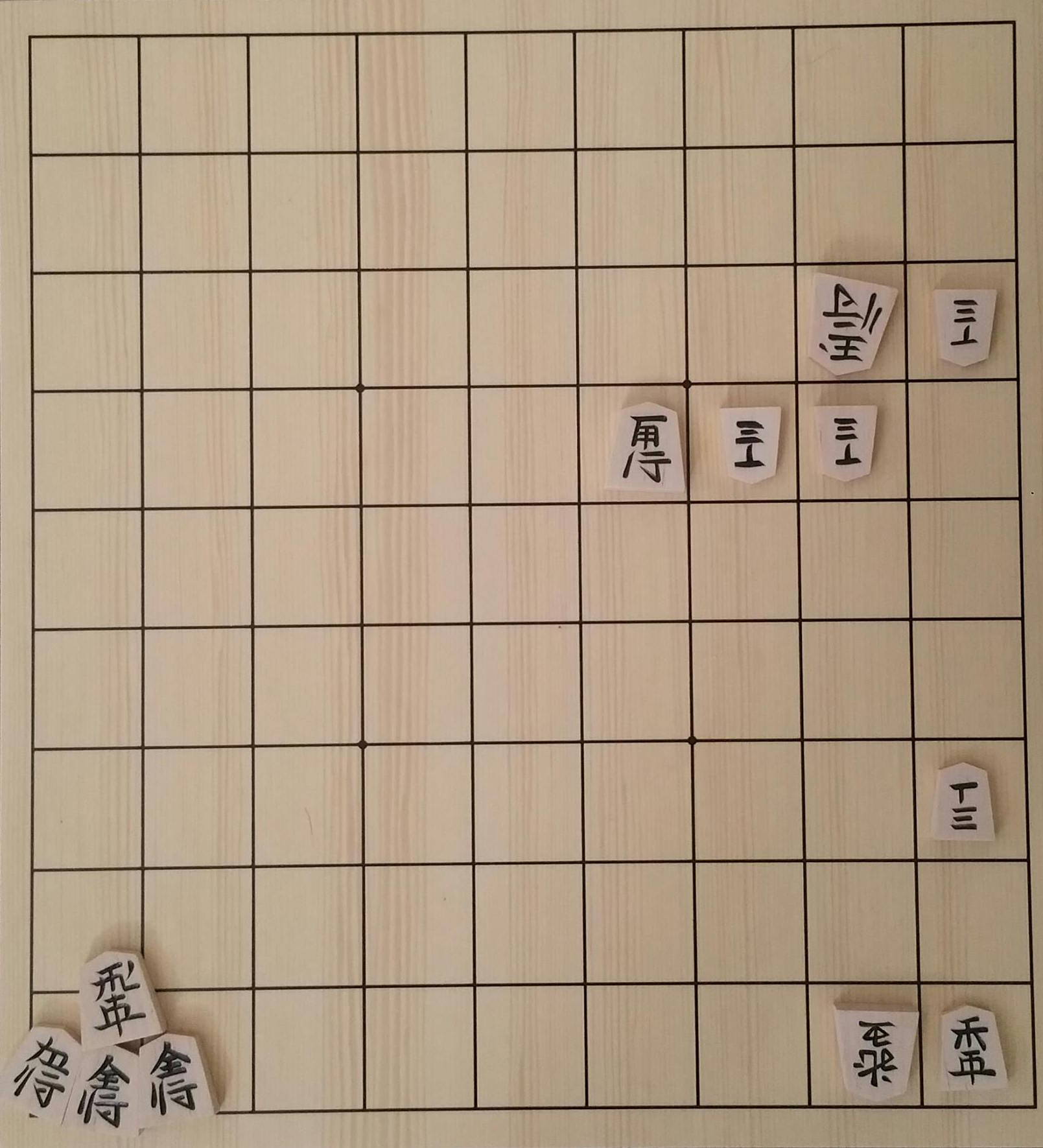
A mate in seven shogi problem (tsume)

The endgame (shūban) starts when one side's defenses have been compromised and their castle or defensive structure begins to collapse. Players then attack the opponent’s king with the objective of achieving checkmate (tsumi), usually with a series of piece drops, checks (ōte) and mating threats (tsumero). A sequence leading to checkmate is called a yose (mating attack). While calculation of material is central to the middle game, it becomes less important in the endgame, which is focused on calculating the possibility of mate. Skill in the calculation of mating sequences is cultivated through regular tsumeshogi (checkmate problem) practice.

There are various traditional shogi aphorisms related to checkmating, including:

- In the endgame, speed is more important than material: While gaining material is the key element of the middle game, in the endgame, how fast one can approach the king to deliver mate is the most important element.
- The check is to chase: This warns against carelessly checking the king without proper calculation, since a king might be driven away towards a safe spot and one will then lose a chance to checkmate.
- Approach the King by Surrounding him: Instead of carelessly checking the enemy king, one is advised to gradually gain control of the squares around the king and restrict its mobility until an "inevitable mate" situation (hisshi) arises or at least a yose near mate position.
- Drive the King to the Back Rank: Since shogi pieces tend to favor forward movement, it is easier to attack the king from the front. Furthermore, a cornered king has fewer squares to escape to.
- Drop a Silver at the King's belly and Drop a Silver behind the King: While these drops do not directly attack the king, they pave the way for mate by blocking the king's escape routes.

If a serious imbalance arose in the middle game, such as one side having broken the opponent's defenses and gained a superior set of pieces in hand, the endgame may be one sided. However, a decisive reversal may occur in the endgame if the opponent can mount a decisive counterattack. In situations where one is subjected to a one-sided attack, another possible option is to aim for "entering king", seeking to penetrate into the opponent’s camp with one’s own king, where he will become more difficult to mate.

== Etiquette ==
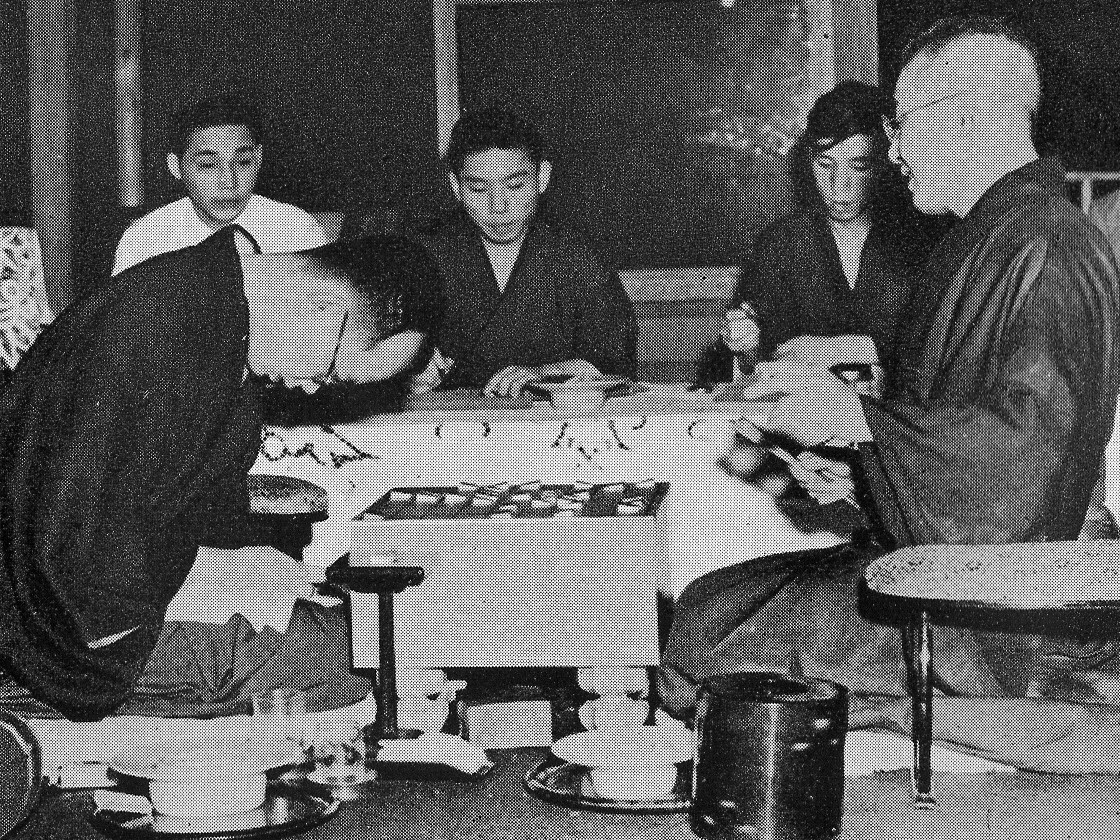
Yasuharu Ōyama bows to Kimura Yoshio at the 11th Meijin Tournament in 1952

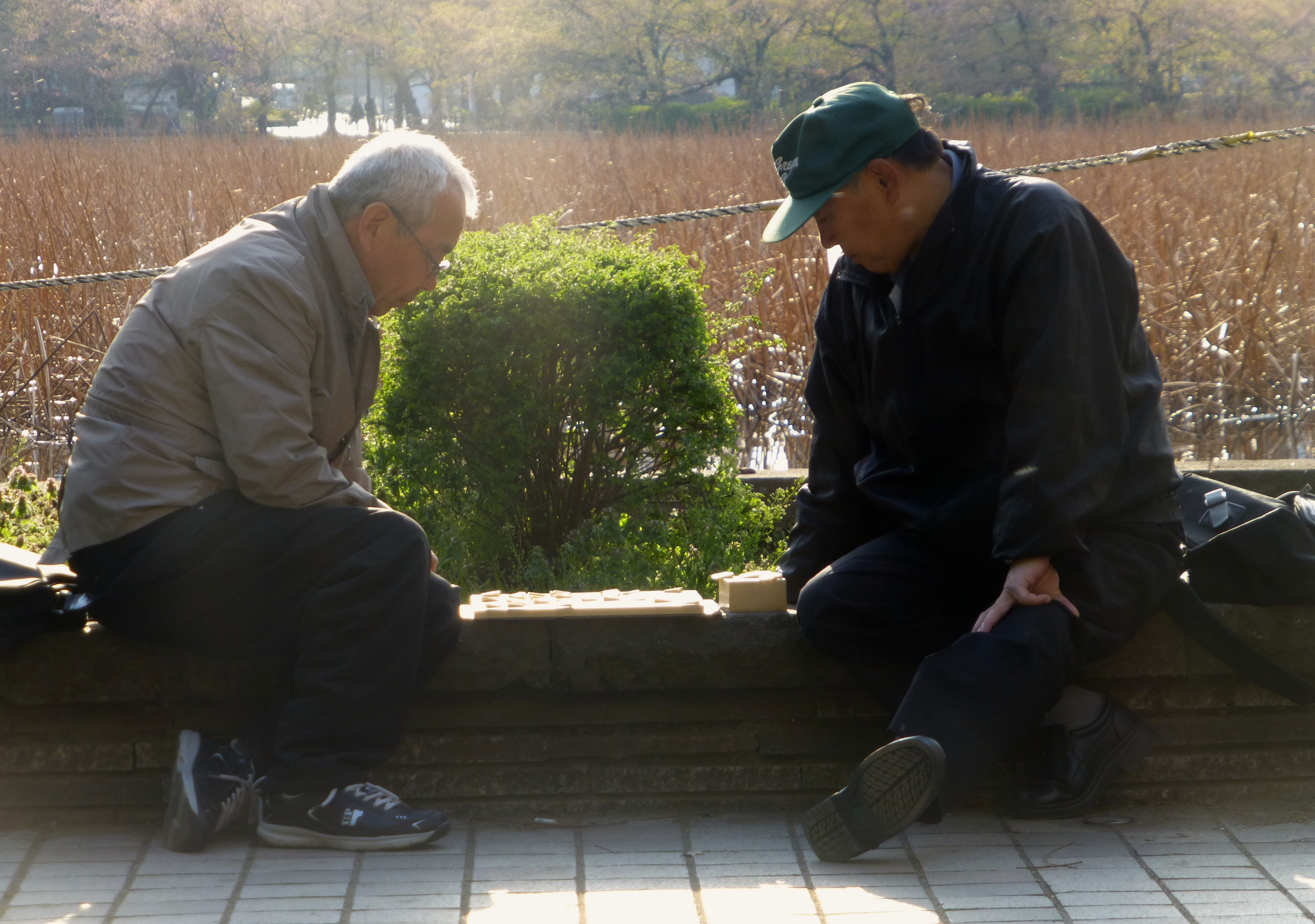
Two men playing shogi outside in Ueno Park, 2014

Shogi players are expected to follow etiquette in addition to rules explicitly described. Commonly accepted etiquette include the following:

- Greetings to the opponent both before and after the game. Common greetings include bowing and the phrase "yoroshiku onegaishimasu" (lit. "please treat me well", a common Japanese greeting). After the game, one usually says "arigatou gozaimasu" ("thank you for your cooperation").
- Acknowledging the difference in strength between the higher-ranked and lower-ranked player. Usually the higher strength player will sit at the top of the table, prepare the pieces and clean them up afterwards. The higher ranked player uses the oshō 王 (king) while the gyokushō 玉 (jewel king) is used by the lower ranked player. In titleholder system games, the current titleholder takes the king piece as the higher. Furthermore, the higher ranked player performs the piece toss to determine who goes first.
- Arranging and placing the pieces so they fit inside the squares in a neat fashion instead of in a messy way.
- Not changing one's move or taking it back
- Fair withdrawal without any disruption, such as scattering pieces on the board to demonstrate frustration
- Announcing one's resignation, often with the phrase "makemashita" ("I lost") or "arimasen" ("there is nothing I can do"). The game is not considered over until the phrase is uttered. The winning side usually responds with "thank you very much" (arigatou gozaimashita).

Shogi does not have a touch-move rule as in western chess tournament play or chu shogi. However, in professional games, a piece is considered to be permanently placed when the moved piece has been let go of. In both amateur and professional play, any piece may be touched in order to adjust its centralization within its square (to look tidy). Immediately taking back moves (待った matta) in professional games is prohibited. However, in friendly amateur games in Japan, it is often permitted by agreement.

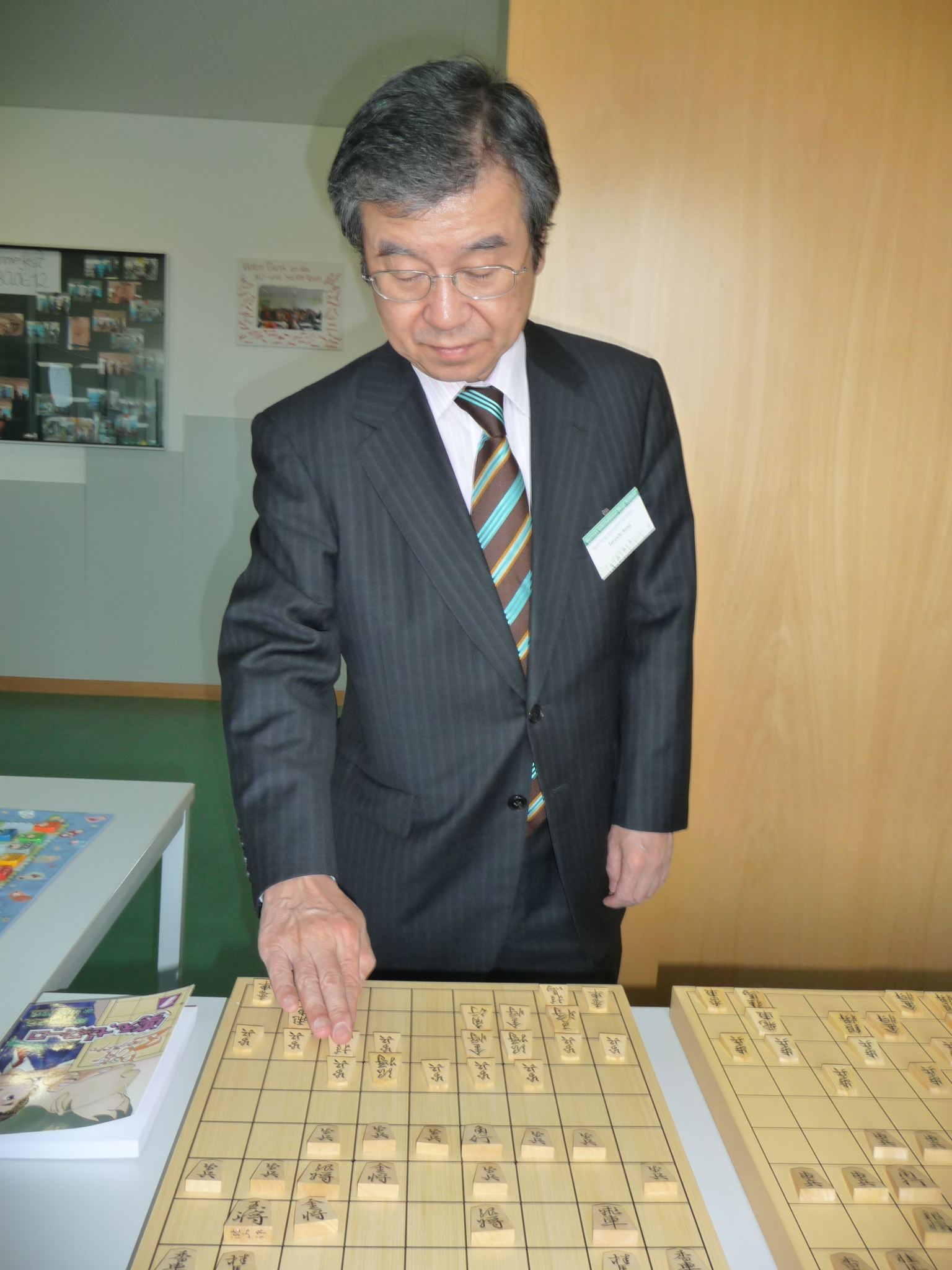
Aono Teruichi moving a piece in the traditional style, which involves placing it down with index finger and middle finger so it makes a distinctive snapping sound.

Professional players are required to follow further rules of etiquette such as kneeling exactly 15 centimeters from the shogi board, sitting in the formal seiza position on a zabuton cushion, setting up the pieces in the traditional orders (see below), using a traditional way to grasp and place the pieces on the board, etc.

Another element of shogi etiquette is taking part in a post-game discussion, the "kansōsen" (感想戦), where players politely analyze the game together.

=== Game setup ===
People arranging large shogi pieces in Shimbashi, 2018

Ōhashi order
19 歩	17 歩	15 歩	13 歩	12 歩	14 歩	16 歩	18 歩	20 歩
	10 角						11 飛	
8 香	6 桂	4 銀	2 金	1 玉	3 金	5 銀	7 桂	9 香

Itō order
8 歩	9 歩	10 歩	11 歩	12 歩	13 歩	14 歩	15 歩	16 歩
	19 角						20 飛	
17 香	6 桂	4 銀	2 金	1 玉	3 金	5 銀	7 桂	18 香

Traditionally, the order of placing the pieces on the board is determined. There are two commonly used orders, the Ōhashi order 大橋流 and the Itō order 伊藤流. Placement sets pieces with multiples (generals, knights, lances) from left to right in all cases, and follows the order:

1. King
2. Gold generals
3. Silver generals
4. Knights

In ito, the player now places:

5. Pawns (left to right starting from the left most file)
6. Lances
7. Bishop
8. Rook

In ohashi, the player now places:

5. Lances
6. Bishop
7. Rook
8. Pawns (starting from center file, then alternating left to right one file at a time)

=== Furigoma ===
Among amateur tournaments, the higher-ranked player or defending champion performs the piece toss. In professional games, the furigoma is done on the behalf of the higher-ranked player/champion by the timekeeper who kneels by the side of the higher-ranked player and tosses the pawn pieces onto a silk cloth. In friendly amateur games, a player will ask the opponent to toss the pawns out of politeness. Otherwise, the person who tosses the pawns can be determined by Rock–paper–scissors.

== History ==
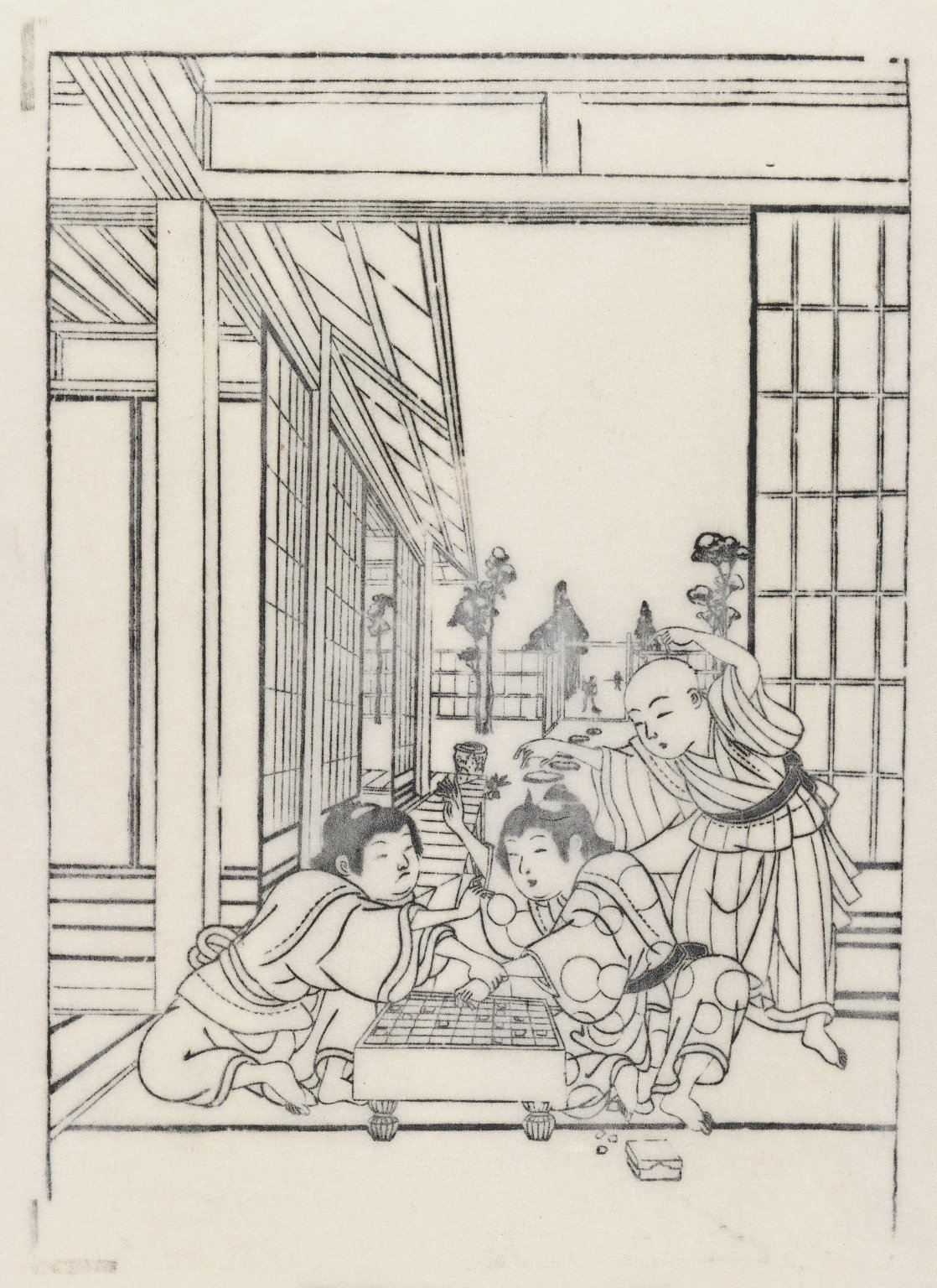
Boys playing shogi (18th century)

Shogi is derived from the Indian chaturanga (which has been dated to the seventh century CE). Chaturanga spread throughout Eurasia, developing into various related games in different regions, such as xiangqi in China, and makruk in Thailand. It is not clear when chess was brought to Japan. The earliest generally accepted mention of shogi is Shin Saru Gakuki (新猿楽記) (1058–1064) by Fujiwara Akihira. The oldest archaeological evidence is a group of 16 shogi pieces excavated from the grounds of Kōfuku-ji in Nara Prefecture. As it was physically associated with a wooden tablet written on in the sixth year of Tengi (1058), the pieces are thought to date from that period. These simple pieces were cut from a writing plaque in the same five-sided shape as modern pieces, with the names of the pieces written on them.

There are various theories concerning how games of the chaturanga lineage were transmitted to Japan, and debates among Japanese scholars continue. Kōichi Masukawa argues for a period of transmission occurring between the 10th and 11th centuries, while Yoshinori Kimura argues for an earlier period (a theory lacking archeological evidence). Furthermore, Kimura argues for a Chinese route of transmission, while Masukawa favors a Southeast Asian route (meaning that shogi would be derived from an ancient makruk type game). The earliest excavated pieces are frequently found at temple sites, suggesting the involvement of Buddhist monks in the transmission of the game.

The Nichūreki (二中歴) (c. 1210–1221), an encyclopedia of folk culture, describes two forms of shogi, large (dai) shogi and small (shō) shogi. These are now called Heian shogi (or Heian small shogi) and Heian dai shogi. Heian small shogi is the version on which modern shogi is based, but the Nichūreki states that one wins if one's opponent is reduced to a single king, indicating that drops had not yet been introduced. According to Yasuji Shimizu, chief researcher at the Archaeological Institute of Kashihara, Nara Prefecture, the names of the Heian shogi pieces keep those of chaturanga (general, elephant, horse, chariot and soldier), and add to them five treasures of Buddhism (jade, gold, silver, cassia bark, and incense).

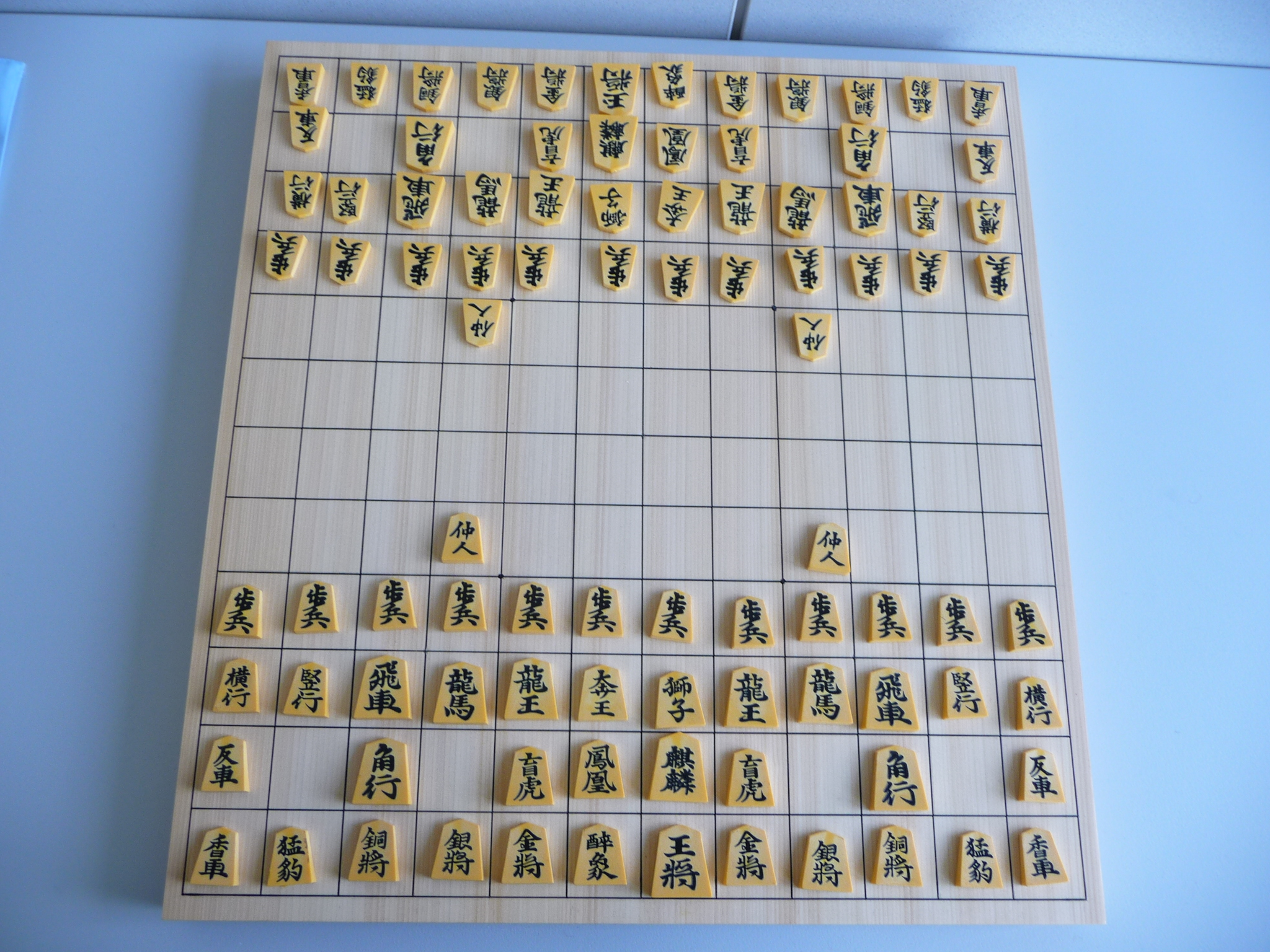
Chu shogi set

Around the 13th century the game of dai shogi developed, created by increasing the number of pieces in Heian shogi, as was sho shogi, which added the rook, bishop, and drunken elephant from dai shogi to Heian shogi. The drunken elephant steps one square in any direction except directly backward, and promotes to the prince, which acts as a second king and must also be captured along with the original king for the other player to win. Around the 15th century, the rules of dai shogi were simplified, creating the game of chu shogi. Chu shogi, like its parent dai shogi, contains many distinct pieces, such as the queen (identical with Western chess) and the lion (which moves like a king, but twice per turn, potentially being able to capture twice, among other idiosyncrasies). The popularity of dai shogi soon waned in favour of chu shogi, until it stopped being played commonly. Chu shogi rivalled sho shogi in popularity until the introduction of drops in the latter, upon which standard shogi became ascendant, although chu shogi was still commonly played until about World War II, especially in Kyoto.

It is thought that the rules of standard shogi were fixed in the 16th century, when the drunken elephant was removed from the set of pieces present in sho shogi. There is no clear record of when drops were introduced, however.

In the Edo period, many large shogi variants were invented, including tenjiku shogi, dai dai shogi, maka dai dai shogi, tai shogi, and taikyoku shogi. However, it is thought that these were played to only a very limited extent. Both standard shogi and go were promoted by the Tokugawa shogunate which granted stipends to masters such as Ōhashi Sōkei and Hon’inbō Sansa, making shogi and go officially recognized arts. Successors of the masters assumed the titles Shogidokoro and Godokoro. During the Edo period, the shogi iemoto system was adopted, and the three main shogi houses were the Ōhashi house, its branch family, and the Itō house. Although these houses used hereditary succession, high playing strength was required to maintain authority, and strong disciples were often adopted to inherit the house. During the reign of the eighth shōgun, Tokugawa Yoshimune, castle shogi tournaments were held once a year on the 17th day of Kannazuki, corresponding to November 17, which is known as "Shogi Day" in Japan. Famous players from the mid-Edo period include Itō Kanju (author of Shōgi Zukō), Ōhashi Sōei and the "Kisei" Amano Sōho.

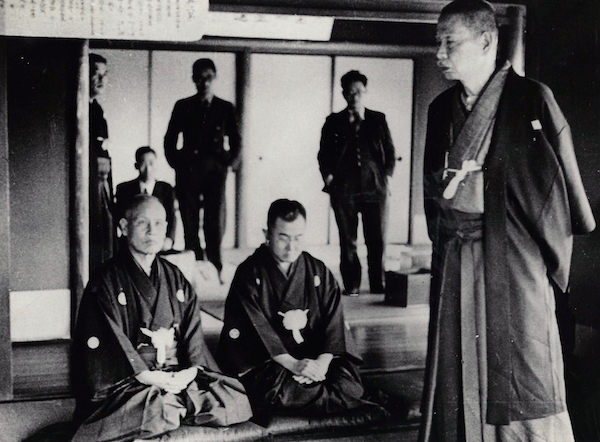
The 1938 Meijin Resignation Ceremony where Kinjirō Sekine formally resigned his position as hereditary meijin, making way for the first tournament-determined Meijin, Yoshio Kimura (middle).

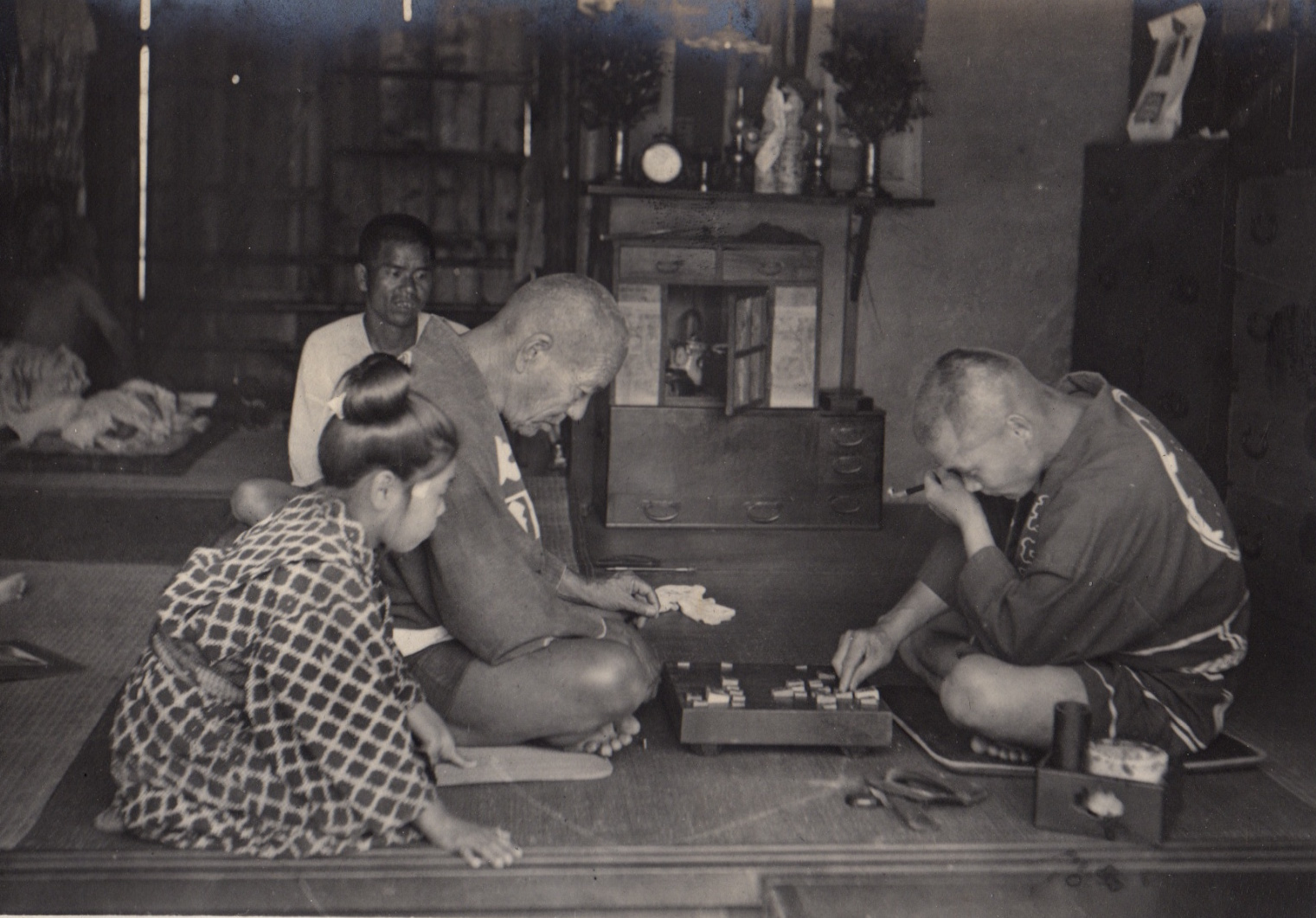
Playing shogi in Japan (c. 1916–1918)

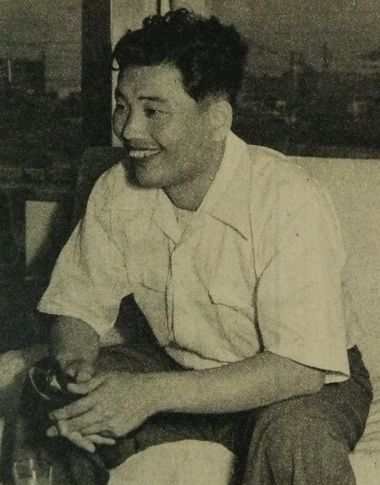
Kōzō Masuda (升田幸三) in 1952, a former meijin

The title of meijin became hereditary in the Ōhashi and Itō families until the fall of the shogunate, when it came to be passed by recommendation. After the fall of the shogunate, stipends ceased, and the iemoto system weakened. Today the meijin title is used for the winner of the Meijin-sen competition, the first modern title match. From around 1899, newspapers began to publish records of shogi matches, and high-ranking players formed alliances with the aim of having their games published. In 1909, the Shogi Association (将棋同盟社) was formed, and in 1924, the Tokyo Shogi Association (東京将棋連盟) was formed. This was an early incarnation of the modern Japan Shogi Association (日本将棋連盟, nihon shōgi renmei), or JSA, and 1924 is considered by the JSA to be the date it was founded.

In 1935, meijin Kinjirō Sekine stepped down, and the rank of meijin came to be awarded to the winner of a Meijin title match (名人戦, meijin-sen). Yoshio Kimura (木村義雄) became the first Meijin under this system in 1937. This was the start of the shogi title matches (see titleholder system). After the war other tournaments were promoted to title matches, culminating with the Ryūō title match (竜王戦, ryūō-sen) in 1988 for the modern line-up of seven. About 200 professional shogi players compete. Each year, the title holder defends the title against a challenger chosen from knockout or round matches.

After the Second World War, SCAP (occupational government mainly led by US) tried to eliminate all "feudal" factors from Japanese society and shogi was included in the possible list of items to be banned along with Bushido (philosophy of samurai) and other things. SCAP's reason for banning shogi was that the game uniquely utilized captured pieces. SCAP insisted that this could lead to the idea of prisoner abuse. Kōzō Masuda, then one of the top professional shogi players, when summoned to the SCAP headquarters for an investigation, criticized such understanding of shogi, instead insisting that it was chess that potentially contained the idea of prisoner abuse, because opposing pieces are removed permanently, while shogi gives prisoners the chance to get back into the game. Masuda also argued that chess contradicts the ideal of gender equality in western society because the king shields himself behind the queen and runs away. Masuda later claimed his arguments eventually led to the exemption of shogi from the list of items to be banned.

Modern shogi features a highly developed theory, education system and literature. There are numerous major title matches along with small amateur tournaments. Women professionals also emerged, and women’s title tournaments began in 1974.

Computer shogi developed from the 1960s onward, becoming important study tools for professionals by the 2000s. By 2017, the program Ponanza defeated Meijin Satō Amahiko, demonstrating machine superiority over a reigning champion.

Internet shogi platforms like 81Dojo proliferated from the 1990s onward.

== Professional Japanese shogi ==
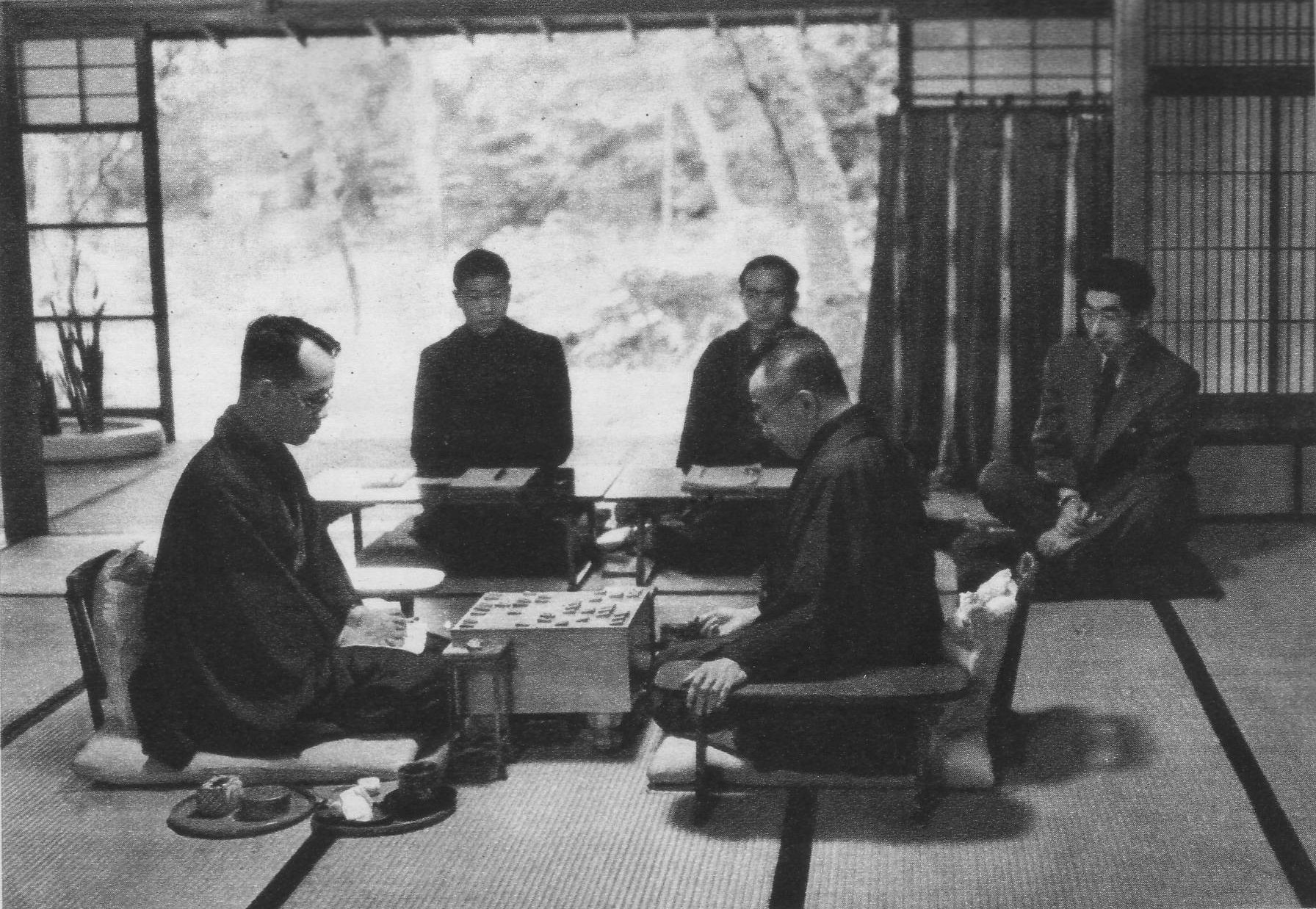
Yoshio Kimura (right) playing against Yasuharu Ōyama in 1952 with Prince Chichibu present

There are two organizations for shogi professional players in Japan: the Japan Shogi Association (JSA) and the Ladies Professional Shogi-players' Association of Japan (LSPA). The JSA is the primary organization for men and women's professional shogi while the LPSA is a group of women professionals who broke away from the JSA in 2007 to establish their own independent organization. Both organize tournaments for their members and have reached an agreement to cooperate with each other to promote shogi through events and other activities. Top professional players are fairly well-paid from tournament earnings. In 2025, Sōta Fujii earned more than JPY 200 million in prize money and game fee earnings.

The JSA recognizes two categories of shogi professionals: professional (棋士 (kishi)) and women's professional (女流棋士 (joryūkishi)). Sometimes kishi are addressed as "regular professionals" (正棋士 (seikishi)), a term from Go used to distinguish kishi from other classes of players. JSA professional ranks and women's professional ranks are not equivalent and each has their own promotion criteria and ranking system. In 2006, the JSA officially granted women "professional status". This is not equivalent, however, to the more traditional way of "gaining professional status", i.e., being promoted from the apprentice professional (奨励会 (shōreikai)) system: leagues of strong amateur players aspiring to become a professional. Rather, it is a separate system especially designed for women's professionals. Qualified amateurs, regardless of gender, may apply for the apprentice professional and all those who successfully "graduate" are granted kishi status. As of October 2025, however, no woman has yet to accomplish this feat although three—Kana Satomi, Tomoka Nishiyama, and Nanami Naka— did reach the apprentice professional 3-dan League before officially switching to women's professional status. So, in common practice, kishi is only used to refer to male shogi professionals.

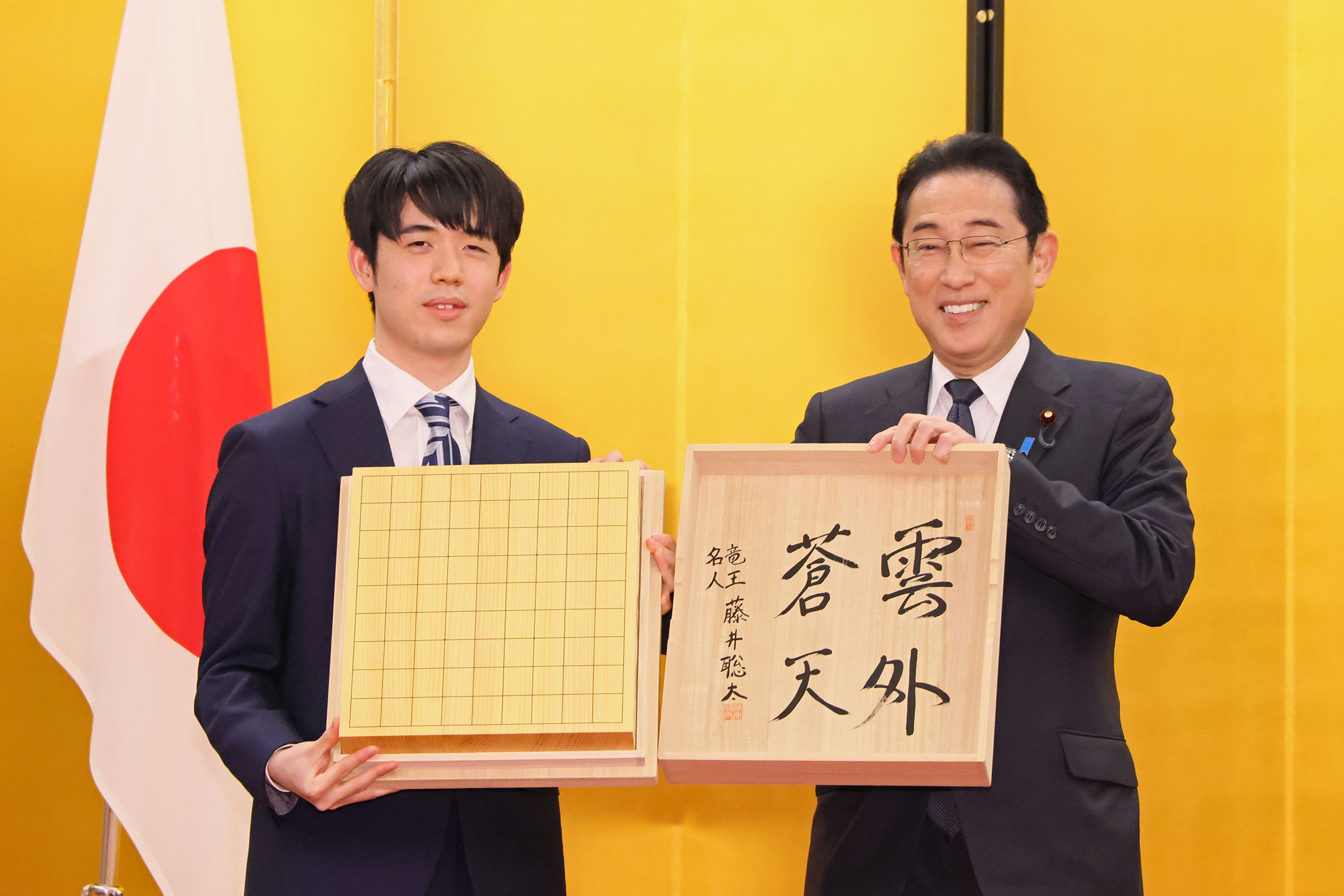
Sōta Fujii (left) with PM Fumio Kishida

The JSA is the only body which can organize tournaments for professionals, e.g., the eight major tournaments in the titleholder system and other professional tournaments. The eight major professional championship titles in the men’s league, known as the “8 Crowns”, are the Meijin, Ryūō, Ōshō, Ōza, Kisei, Kiō, and Eiō. In 1996, Yoshiharu Habu became the first person to hold seven major titles at the same time. (Note: There were only seven major titles in 1996. The current eighth major title the Eiō was upgraded to major title status in May 2017) In 2023, Sōta Fujii became the first player to hold all eight major titles at the same time. For women's professionals, both the JSA and LPSA organize tournaments, either jointly or separately. Tournaments for amateurs may be organized by the JSA and LPSA as well as local clubs, newspapers, private corporations, educational institutions, or municipal governments for cities or prefectures under the guidance of the JSA or LPSA.

== International shogi ==
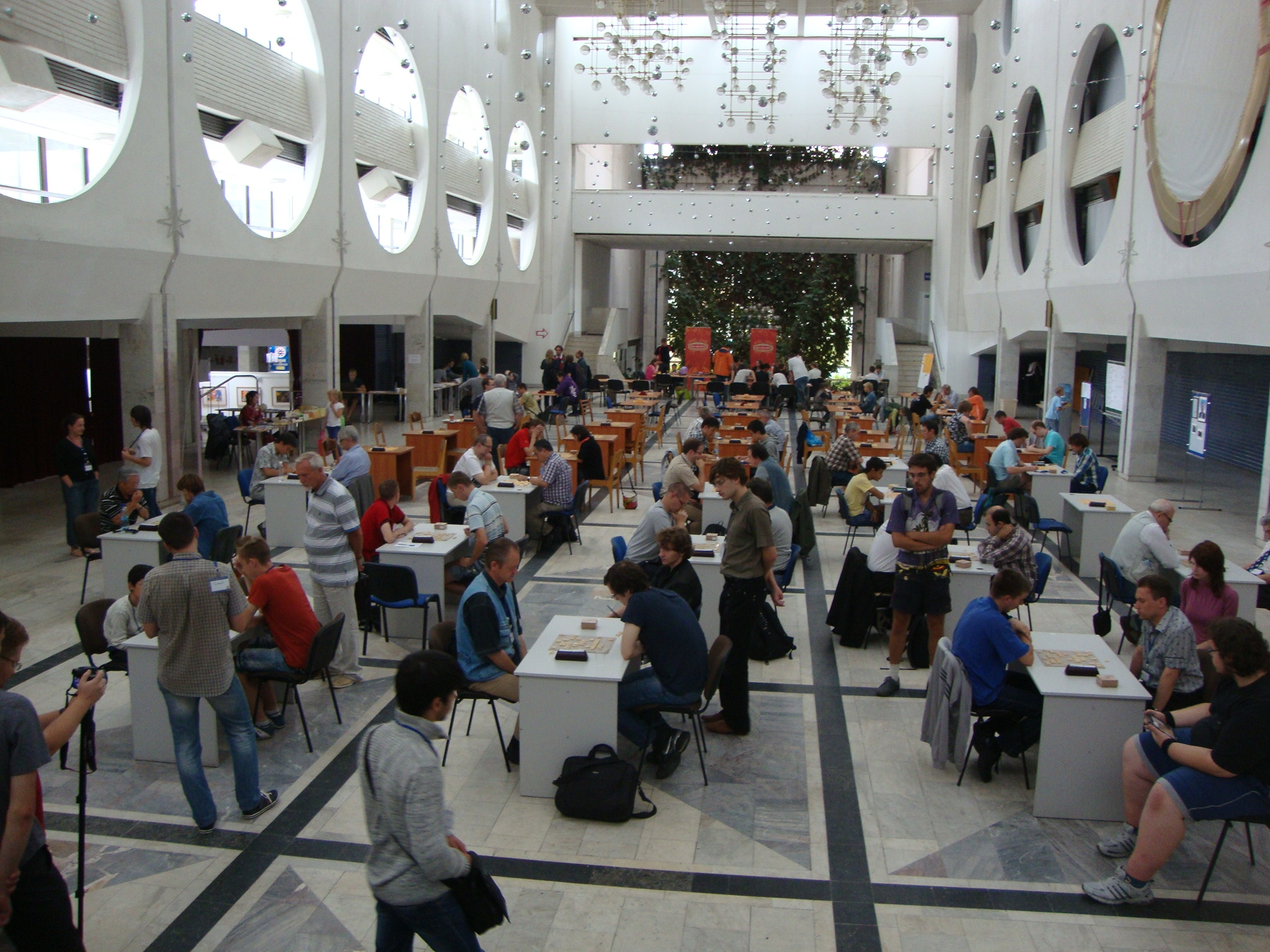
2013 World Shogi Open Championship (amateur) tournament in Minsk

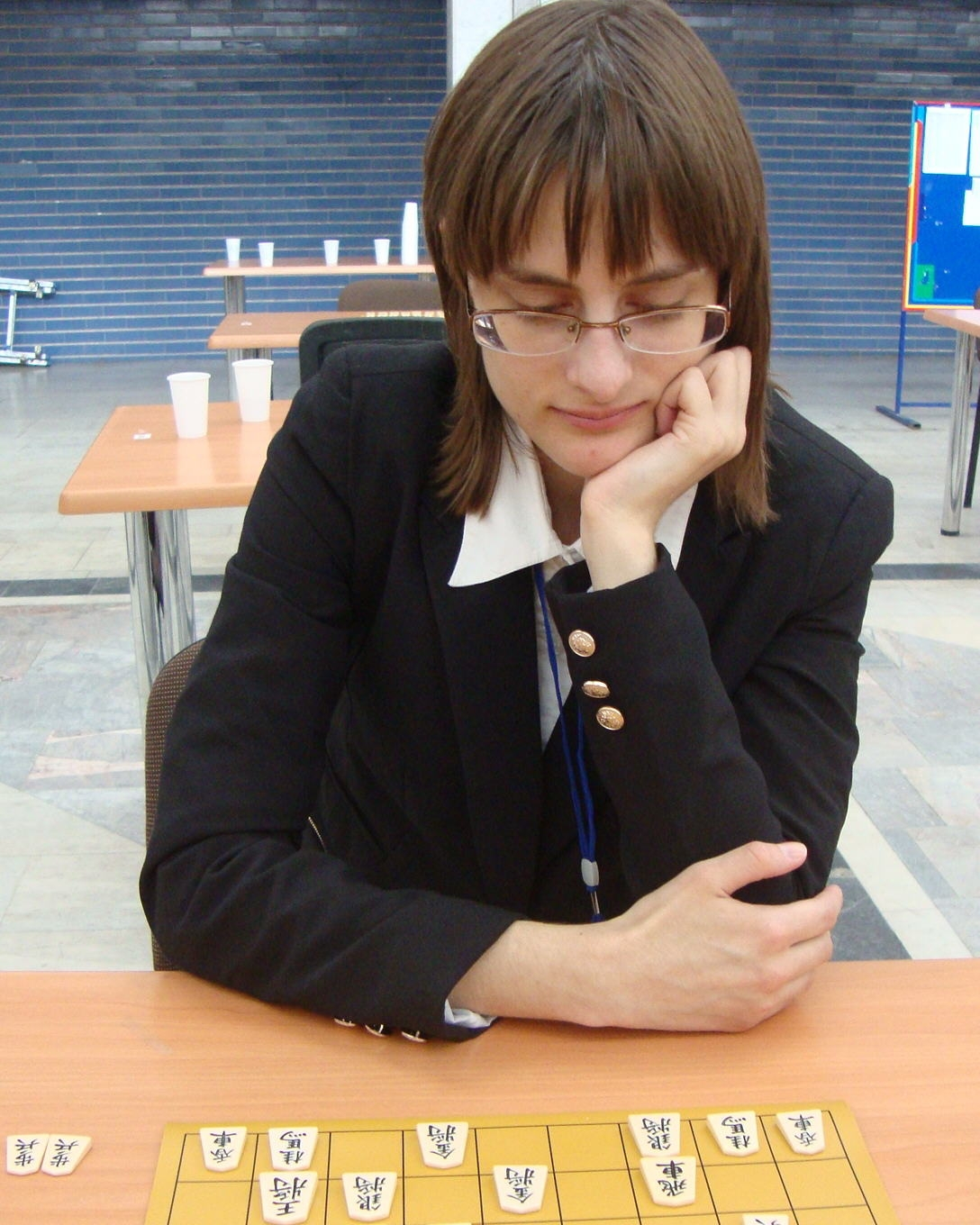
Karolina Styczyńska became the first non-Japanese professional shogi player in 2017.

Shogi has been introduced abroad since at least the late 16th century, though it remains limited in popularity. In 1966 5th dan Trevor Leggett published Shogi: Japan’s Game of Strategy, one of the earliest such publications in English. In 1975 George F. Hodges founded The Shogi Association in the United Kingdom, and began publishing SHOGI magazine in 1976, which reached 70 issues. The Federation of European Shogi Associations (FESA) was established in 1985.

European shogi tournaments vary in format, including both individual and team competitions. Major events are typically held annually, attracting players of all skill levels. The tournaments often feature different time controls, ranging from classical formats to faster-paced variants like blitz shogi. Notable tournaments include the European Shogi Championship and various national championships. As of November 2017, there were over 1,200 active players in Europe.

There are also shogi clubs in the United States, especially in the west coast cities. North American shogi championships have been held since the 1980s under the auspices of the United States Shogi Federation. One of the strongest American players of the 20th century is Chess GM Larry Kaufman, who took numerous trips to Japan to study shogi there with professional and amateur players, reaching the rank of 5 dan.

The rise of personal computing also led to a growth in online shogi play. One influential figure in this regard is the Japanese player Tomohide Kawasaki. He is known for the creation of a popular series of shogi videos on youtube (under the name Hidetchi) and for translating shogi books into English. He is also known for programming and maintaining the 81dojo shogi website, which has become a key place for international shogi players to play online and organize tournaments. Since 2013, 81dojo has been officially sponsored by the Japan Shogi Association.

Since the 1990s, shogi has grown in popularity outside Japan, particularly in the People's Republic of China, and especially in Shanghai, largely through the efforts of Xu Jiandong, founder of the Shanghai Xujiandong Shogi Club, who has promoted the game in Shanghai's primary and secondary schools since the early 2000s. The January 2006 edition of Kindai Shogi (近代将棋) stated that there were 120,000 shogi players in Shanghai. The spread of the game to countries where Chinese characters are not in common use, however, has been slower.

== Computer shogi ==
Shogi has the highest game complexity of all popular chess variants. Computers have steadily improved in playing shogi since the 1970s. In 2007, champion Yoshiharu Habu estimated the strength of the 2006 world computer shogi champion Bonanza at the level of two-dan shoreikai.

The JSA prohibits its professionals from playing computers in public without prior permission, with the reason of promoting shogi and monetizing the computer–human events.

On October 12, 2010, after some 35 years of development, a computer finally beat a professional player, when the top ranked female champion Ichiyo Shimizu was beaten by the Akara2010 system in a game lasting just over 6 hours.

On July 24, 2011, computer shogi programs Bonanza and Akara crushed the amateur team of Kosaku and Shinoda in two games. The allotted time for the amateurs was one hour and then three minutes per move. The allotted time for the computer was 25 minutes and then 10 seconds per move.

On April 20, 2013, GPS Shogi defeated 8-dan professional shogi player Hiroyuki Miura in a 102-move game which lasted over 8 hours.

On December 13, 2015, the highest rated player on Shogi Club 24 was computer program Ponanza, rated 3455.

On April 10, 2016, Ponanza defeated Takayuki Yamasaki, 8-dan in 85 moves. Takayuki used 7 hours 9 minutes.

In October 2017, DeepMind claimed that its program AlphaZero, after a full nine hours of training, defeated Elmo in a 100-game match, winning 90, losing 8, and drawing two.

From a computational complexity point of view, generalized shogi is EXPTIME-complete.

== Video games ==
Hundreds of video games were released exclusively in Japan for several consoles.

Clubhouse Games: 42 All-Time Classics was released by Nintendo internationally for the Nintendo DS, and offered Shogi as one of the games in its Board Games category. Its sequel, Clubhouse Games: 51 Worldwide Classics, for the Nintendo Switch console, offers both Shogi and mini Shogi variants using either traditional or bilingual pieces.

== Culture ==
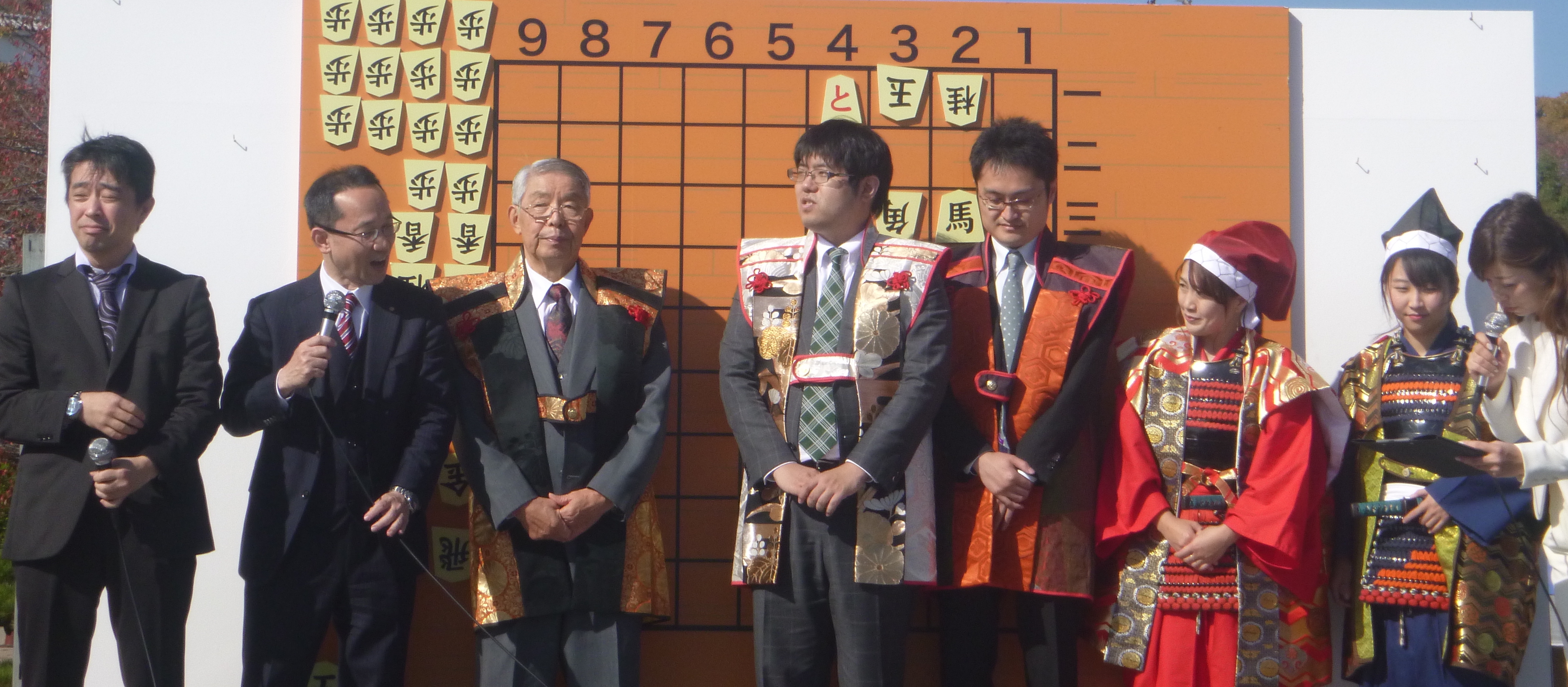
Shogi players in line. From left to right: Toshiaki Kubo, Keita Inoue, Masakazu Wakamatsu, Tetsurō Itodani, Akira Inaba, Shinobu Iwane and Rei Takedomi (in Himeji, Japan)

According to professional player Yoshiharu Habu, in Japan shogi is viewed as not merely a game as entertainment or a mind sport but is instead an art that is a part of traditional Japanese culture along with haiku, tanka, noh, ikebana, and the Japanese tea ceremony. Its elevated status was established by the iemoto system supported by the historical shogunate.

The backwards uma (shogi horse symbol) is often featured on merchandise (such as on large decorative shogi piece sculptures, keychains, and other keepsakes) available for sale in Tendō. It also serves as a symbol of good luck. (Cf. Rabbit's foot.) There are multiple theories on its origin. One is that uma (うま ) spelled in the Japanese syllabary backwards is まう mau (舞う), which means (to) dance and dancing horses are a good luck omen.

Airing in 2025 on Netflix, a TV series titled Miss King featured shogi as a focal point of the drama series.

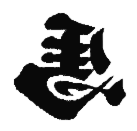
The backwards 馬 uma (左馬 hidari uma)

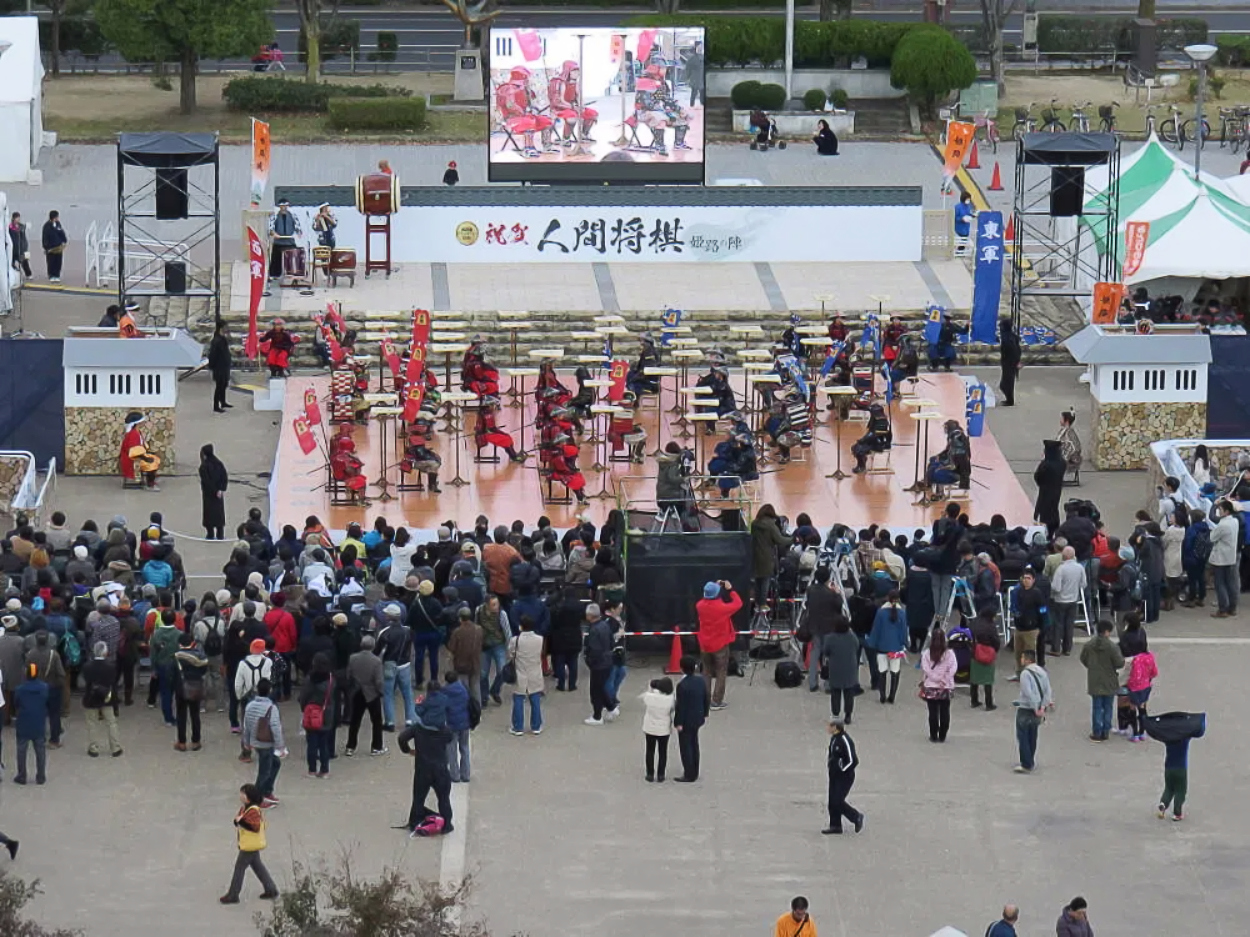
Ningen Shogi held in Himeji City with real people (2015)

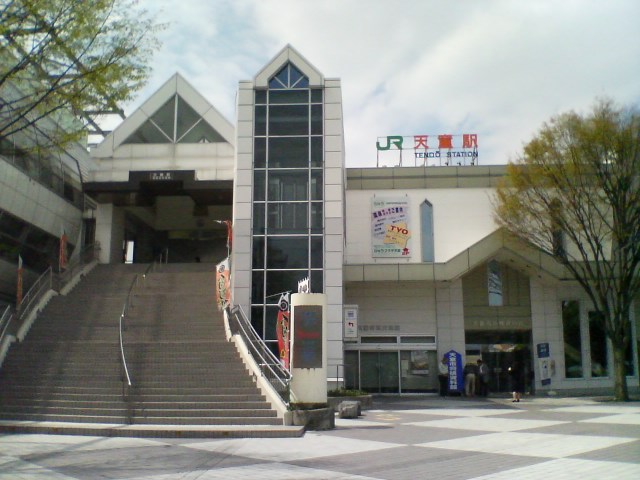
Tendō shogi museum (right) next to Tendō Station (top)

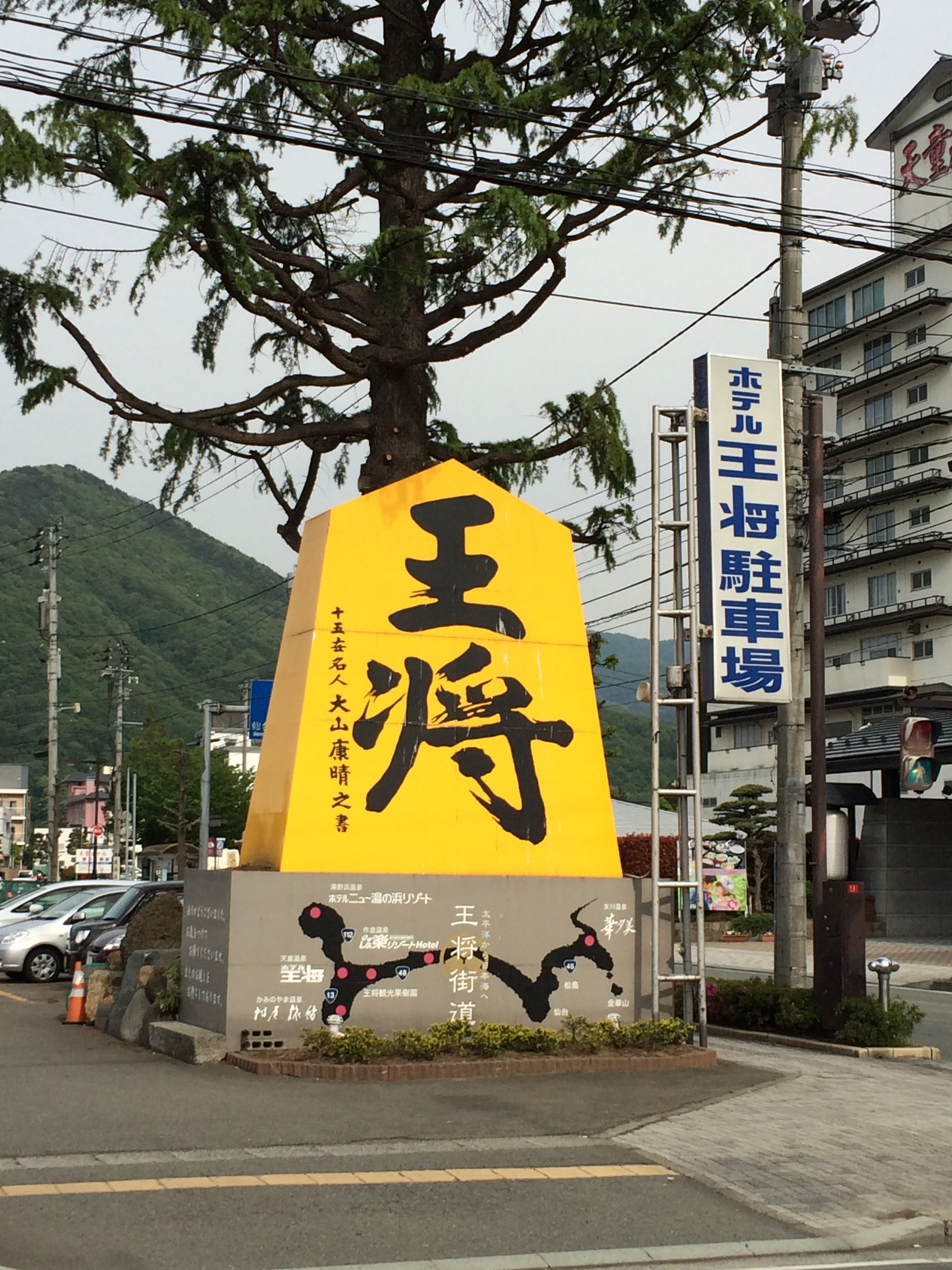
Giant Shogi Piece in Tendo

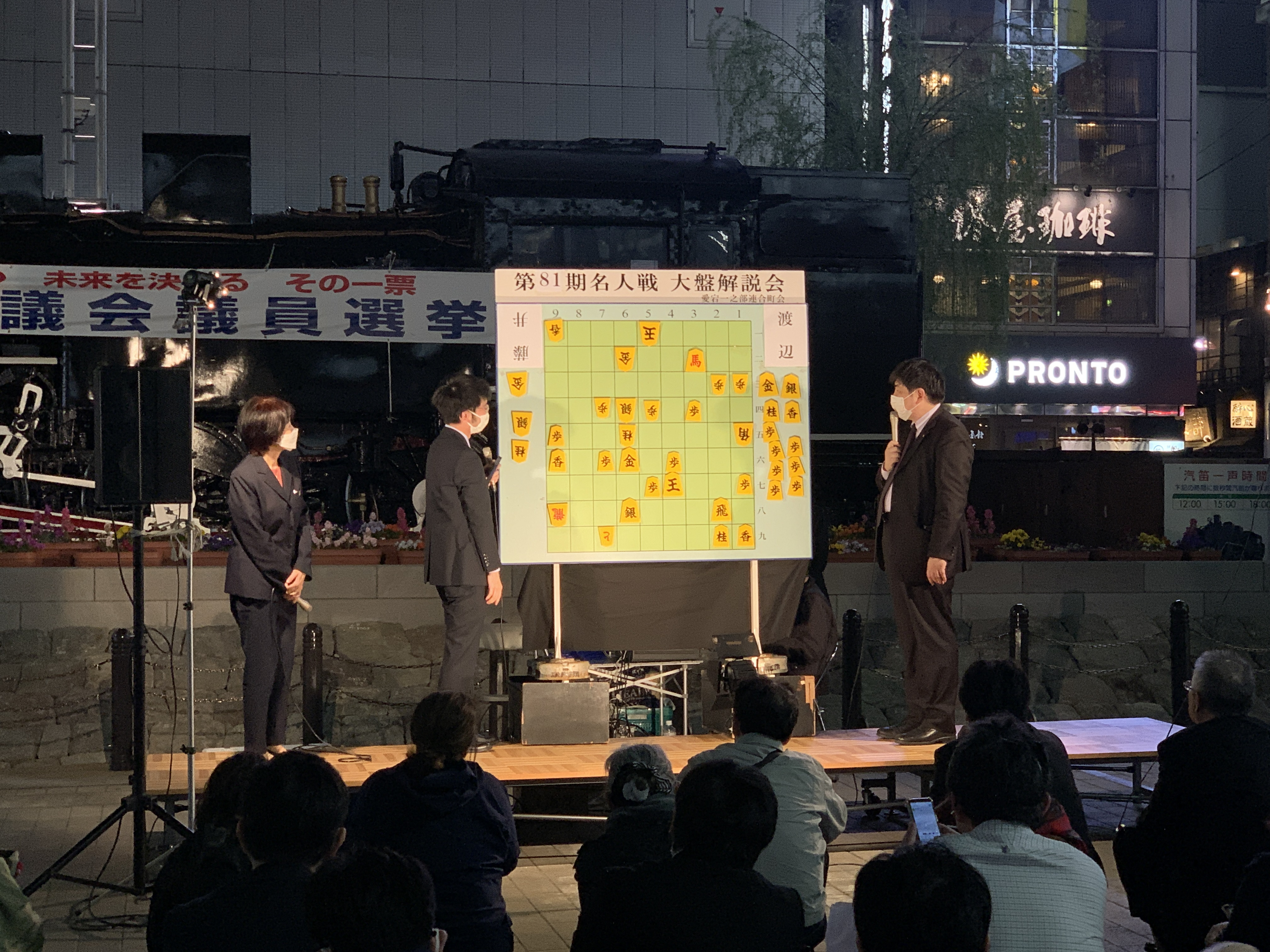
Shogi Meijin sen show at shibashi SL hiroba

== Comparison to chess ==
While both shogi and chess evolved from the same Indian game of chaturanga, they have significant differences. Shogi's drop rule is perhaps the central mechanic that separates shogi from chess, making it a more complex game overall. Shogi's game tree complexity of 10^{226} is significantly larger than that of FIDE chess (10^{123}). The use of drops, greater number of pieces, and larger board size contribute to this increased complexity.

In comparison, shogi games average about 140 (half-)moves per game (or 70 chess move-pairs) whereas chess games average about 80 moves per game (or 40 chess move-pairs) and minishogi averages about 40 moves per game (or 20 chess move-pairs). (Note: In shogi and Western chess, the term move has different definitions, which may cause confusion for western chess players. In Japanese language texts, the term 手 te translated as "move" or "tempo" (as in 手数 tesū "number of moves") is defined as a single player moving their piece. However, in Western chess, the English term move is defined as two players each moving their pieces once – in other words, a move-pair. Thus, the English shogi term move would be called a half-move in English chess terminology. Wikipedia follows the shogi usage and not the chess usage for the term move.)

The rarity of draws in shogi (2-3%) is also another feature that sets the game apart from classic chess.

Chess is characterized by numerous long-range pieces (sliders), while most shogi pieces have short range moves that have a bias for forward movement. This short range movement is balanced by the drop rule, which allows shogi moves to cover the board in a different manner. Furthermore, shogi pieces never go out of play, while chess pieces do. Thus, material advantage and piece exchanges are more important in chess than in shogi. Likewise, shogi endgames are not characterized by a diminished number of pieces on the board as they are in chess. Positional play in shogi is also very different due to the forward capture of shogi pawns, which means there are no pawn chains in shogi like in chess. Instead, pawns are useful as tools for sacrifices and drops (which can be used to repair pawn formations). Regarding castling, in shogi this refers to a sequence of individual moves that achieves a specific defensive formation, not a special move like in FIDE chess.

== See also ==
- Mind sport
- Shogi tactics
- Shogi strategy
- Shogi variants
  - Chu shogi
  - Dai shogi
  - Dōbutsu shōgi
- Tsumeshogi
- Chess variants
  - Crazyhouse
- Computer shogi
- List of world championships in mind sports
- Janggi
- Xiangqi

== Bibliography ==
- SHOGI Magazine (70 issues, January 1976 – November 1987) by The Shogi Association (edited by George Hodges)
- Aono, Teruichi (1983). Better Moves for Better Shogi. translated by John Fairbairn. Tokyo, Japan: Sankaido Publishing Co., Ltd. ISBN 978-4-381-00597-7.
- Aono, Teruichi (1983). Guide to Shogi Openings: Shogi Problems in Japanese and English. translated by John Fairbairn. Tokyo, Japan: Sankaido Publishing Co., Ltd. ISBN 978-4-381-00598-4.
- Fairbairn, John (1986). Shogi for beginners (2nd ed.). Ishi Press. ISBN 978-4-8718-720-10.
- Habu, Yoshiharu; Hosking, Tony (2000). Habu's Words. translated by Tony Hosking and Yamato Takahashi. Stratford-upon-Avon, England: The Shogi Foundation. ISBN 978-0-9531089-2-3.
- Hosking, Tony (1997). The Art of Shogi. Stratford-upon-Avon, England: The Shogi Foundation. ISBN 978-0-9531089-0-9.
- Kaufman, Larry (2021). Chess Board Options. New in Chess. ISBN 978-9-056-91933-7.
- Hosking, Tony (2006). Classic Shogi: Games Collection. Stratford-upon-Avon, England: The Shogi Foundation. ISBN 978-0-9531089-3-0.
- Pritchard, D. B. (1994). "Shogi". The Encyclopedia of Chess Variants. Games & Puzzles Publications. pp. 269–79. ISBN 0-9524142-0-1.
- Yebisu, Miles (2016). Comprehensive shogi guide in English: How to play Japanese chess. Laboratory Publishing.
