= 8-Piece handicap =

Handicap in shogi

8-Piece
☖ pieces in hand: –

9	8	7	6	5	4	3	2	1
			金	王	金				1
									2
歩	歩	歩	歩	歩	歩	歩	歩	歩	3
									4
									5
									6
歩	歩	歩	歩	歩	歩	歩	歩	歩	7
	角						飛		8
香	桂	銀	金	玉	金	銀	桂	香	9

☗ pieces in hand: –

The 8-Piece (八枚落ち hachimai-ochi) handicap in shogi has both of White's major pieces, the rook and the bishop, removed as well as their lances, knights, and silvers. White only has the line of pawns and two gold plus their king.

Black has the usual setup of twenty pieces.

The handicap is not a part of the current official handicap system of the Japan Shogi Association, but it is still used by novice players and has received joseki treatment in shogi texts.

== Openings ==
First move
☖ pieces in hand: –

9	8	7	6	5	4	3	2	1
			金	王					1
						金			2
歩	歩	歩	歩	歩	歩	歩	歩	歩	3
									4
									5
									6
歩	歩	歩	歩	歩	歩	歩	歩	歩	7
	角						飛		8
香	桂	銀	金	玉	金	銀	桂	香	9

☗ pieces in hand: –
1...G-32
Bishop Diagonal
☖ pieces in hand: –

9	8	7	6	5	4	3	2	1
				王					1
		金				金			2
歩	歩	歩	歩	歩	歩	歩	歩	歩	3
									4
									5
		歩							6
歩	歩		歩	歩	歩	歩	歩	歩	7
	角						飛		8
香	桂	銀	金	玉	金	銀	桂	香	9

☗ pieces in hand: –
2.P-76 G-72

Unlike the larger 10-Piece and 9-Piece handicaps, the 8-Piece is more balanced with White having the minimum number of pieces needed to defend their line of pawns from Black's early bishop attacks.

The first couple of moves by White are crucial. The fastest attack that Black can initiate is via their bishop. Once their bishop's diagonal is open, the bishop is directly attacking White's pawn on 33. Therefore, White must address this threat in their first two moves. Additionally, once the bishop is mobile, Black may also threaten White's right edge pawn on 93. White must accordingly address this in their first two moves as well. If these two points are not defended properly, then Black will succeed in breaching White's camp very early in the game.

1...G-32. White prepares for the bishop attack on 33 by defending the pawns on 23, 33, and 43.

Alternately, White's king may move to 42 defending 33 if White intends to position the king on the left side of their board as suggested by Hosking.

2.P-76. Black opens their bishop's diagonal.

2...G-72. White moves their gold to defend the pawns on files 6–8. Additionally, Black is also threatening to move their bishop to 66 attacking White's edge. If White does not move their gold to 72 by their second move, then White will not be fast enough to actually defend 93. (See example in next subsection.)

The first two moves by White may also be transposed to the order 1...G-72 2.P-76 G-32 (or 1...G-72 2.P-76 K-42). What is essential is that the 32 and 82 squares are defended before Black's second move (or the third move of the game).

After this, there are many possible strategies Black can use to defeat White. The initial setup suggested by Kageyama & Kimura (1955) is in §3.☗B-66 5.☗P-56 and, for contrast, two related lines for Climbing Silver attacks from Shoshi (2000) are in the subsection of §Climbing Silver. Fairbairn (1981) recommends the Sleeve Rook attack (moving the rook to the third file) in §R-34 variation. Finally, since White's edge files (files 1 and 9) are sparsely defended (as the handicap has their lances removed), Black could also try an edge attack. (Nonetheless, there are still many other plans Black could use against White also including Ranging Rook strategies.)

=== White's failing to defend ninth file ===
Failure to defend file 8
☖ pieces in hand: –

9	8	7	6	5	4	3	2	1
			金						1
				王		金			2
歩	歩	歩	歩	歩	歩	歩	歩	歩	3
									4
									5
		歩	角						6
歩	歩		歩	歩	歩	歩	歩	歩	7
							飛		8
香	桂	銀	金	玉	金	銀	桂	香	9

☗ pieces in hand: –
1...G-32 2.P-76 K-52? 3.B-66
Failure to defend file 9
☖ pieces in hand: –

9	8	7	6	5	4	3	2	1
									1
		金		王		金			2
馬	歩	歩	歩	歩	歩	歩	歩	歩	3
									4
									5
		歩							6
歩	歩		歩	歩	歩	歩	歩	歩	7
							飛		8
香	桂	銀	金	玉	金	銀	桂	香	9

☗ pieces in hand: 歩
3...G-72 4.Bx93+!

To the right is an example of White failing to defend the eighth file pawn by their second move and the ninth file pawn by their third move. Since White's gold was not moved, Black breaks through White's camp at an early juncture.

=== 3.☗B-66 5.☗P-56 ===
☖ pieces in hand: –

9	8	7	6	5	4	3	2	1
				王					1
	金					金			2
歩	歩	歩	歩	歩	歩	歩	歩	歩	3
									4
									5
		歩	角						6
歩	歩		歩	歩	歩	歩	歩	歩	7
							飛		8
香	桂	銀	金	玉	金	銀	桂	香	9

☗ pieces in hand: –
3.B-66 G-82
☖ pieces in hand: –

9	8	7	6	5	4	3	2	1
				王					1
	金					金			2
歩	歩	歩	歩	歩	歩	歩	歩	歩	3
									4
									5
		歩	角	歩					6
歩	歩		歩		歩	歩	歩	歩	7
							飛		8
香	桂	銀	金	玉	金	銀	桂	香	9

☗ pieces in hand: –
3.P-56

This is the line suggested by Kageyama & Kimura (1955).

3.B-66 G-82. As in the 9-Piece handicap, Black attacks White's ninth file pawn forcing White to defend with the gold.

4.P-56. Black pushes their central pawn in order to allow the bishop to move to the 57 square. (Cf. 9-Piece§☗4.P-56.)

☖ pieces in hand: –

9	8	7	6	5	4	3	2	1
				王					1
	金					金			2
歩	歩	歩	歩	歩	歩	歩		歩	3
							歩		4
									5
		歩	角	歩					6
歩	歩		歩		歩	歩	歩	歩	7
							飛		8
香	桂	銀	金	玉	金	銀	桂	香	9

☗ pieces in hand: –
3...P-24
☖ pieces in hand: –

9	8	7	6	5	4	3	2	1
				王					1
	金								2
歩	歩	歩	歩	歩	歩	歩	金	歩	3
							歩		4
									5
		歩		歩					6
歩	歩		歩	角	歩	歩	歩	歩	7
							飛		8
香	桂	銀	金	玉	金	銀	桂	香	9

☗ pieces in hand: –
4.B-56 G-23

After these moves, White has developed a minimal defense from an early attack. Now Black must continue to plan a more complex attack.

=== Climbing Silver ===
Rook Pawn
☖ pieces in hand: –

9	8	7	6	5	4	3	2	1
				王					1
		金				金			2
歩	歩	歩	歩	歩	歩	歩	歩	歩	3
									4
									5
		歩					歩		6
歩	歩		歩	歩	歩	歩		歩	7
	角						飛		8
香	桂	銀	金	玉	金	銀	桂	香	9

☗ pieces in hand: –
3.P-26

After the initial three moves (1...G-32 2.P-76 G-72), the general strategy for Black that professional player Kazuharu Shoshi recommends is to activate both the bishop and the rook and start a Climbing Silver attack (下手棒銀戦法 shitate bōgin senpō).

He offers the two variations shown below. The first variation positions White's king on the right side (with 3...K-52) while the second positions the king on the left (with 3...K-42).

3.P-26. In order to build a Climbing Silver structure, Black must create an open space in their line of pawns so that their right silver can climb out (with S-38, S-27, S-26).

The general idea of Climbing Silver to create an attack with their (second file) rook pawn, right silver, and supporting rook with the bishop also thrown in for good measure (which was activated by opening the bishop diagonal with the 2.P-76 pawn push).

==== ☖K-52 ====
K-52
☖ pieces in hand: –

9	8	7	6	5	4	3	2	1
									1
		金		王		金			2
歩	歩	歩	歩	歩	歩	歩	歩	歩	3
									4
									5
		歩					歩		6
歩	歩		歩	歩	歩	歩		歩	7
	角						飛		8
香	桂	銀	金	玉	金	銀	桂	香	9

☗ pieces in hand: –
3...K-52
Rook Pawn
☖ pieces in hand: –

9	8	7	6	5	4	3	2	1
									1
		金		王		金			2
歩	歩	歩	歩	歩	歩	歩	歩	歩	3
									4
							歩		5
		歩							6
歩	歩		歩	歩	歩	歩		歩	7
	角						飛		8
香	桂	銀	金	玉	金	銀	桂	香	9

☗ pieces in hand: –
4.P-25

In this variation, White moves his king in the center of the board initially. This position allows the king to flee sooner from Black's attack (compared to 3...K-42 as shown in the following subsection), which will happen on the left side of the board (Shoshi 2000).

3...K-52 4.P-25.

Climbing Silver
☖ pieces in hand: –

9	8	7	6	5	4	3	2	1
									1
		金		王		金			2
歩	歩	歩		歩	歩	歩	歩	歩	3
			歩						4
							歩		5
		歩							6
歩	歩		歩	歩	歩	歩		歩	7
	角					銀	飛		8
香	桂	銀	金	玉	金		桂	香	9

☗ pieces in hand: –
4...P-64 5.S-38
Climbing Silver
☖ pieces in hand: –

9	8	7	6	5	4	3	2	1
									1
		金				金			2
歩	歩		王	歩	歩	歩	歩	歩	3
		歩	歩						4
							歩		5
		歩					銀		6
歩	歩		歩	歩	歩	歩		歩	7
	角						飛		8
香	桂	銀	金	玉	金		桂	香	9

☗ pieces in hand: –
5...K-63 6.S-27 P-74 7.S-26

4...P-64 5.S-38 K-63 6.S-27 P-74 7.S-26

Climbing Silver
☖ pieces in hand: –

9	8	7	6	5	4	3	2	1
									1
						金			2
歩	歩	金	王	歩	歩	歩	歩	歩	3
		歩	歩						4
						銀	歩		5
		歩							6
歩	歩		歩	歩	歩	歩		歩	7
	角						飛		8
香	桂	銀	金	玉	金		桂	香	9

☗ pieces in hand: –
7...G-73 8.S-35
Climbing Silver
☖ pieces in hand: –

9	8	7	6	5	4	3	2	1
									1
						金			2
歩	歩	金	王	歩	歩	歩	歩	歩	3
		歩							4
			歩			銀	歩		5
		歩							6
歩	歩		歩	歩	歩	歩		歩	7
	角						飛		8
香	桂	銀	金	玉	金		桂	香	9

☗ pieces in hand: –
8...P-65

8.S-35. The Climbing Silver formation is complete with Black's silver on rank 5.

Attack
☖ pieces in hand: 歩

9	8	7	6	5	4	3	2	1
									1
					金				2
歩	歩	金	王	歩	歩	全		歩	3
		歩							4
			歩						5
		歩							6
歩	歩		歩	歩	歩	歩		歩	7
	角						飛		8
香	桂	銀	金	玉	金		桂	香	9

☗ pieces in hand: 歩歩
9.P-24 Px24 10.Sx24 G-42 11.Sx43+
continued
☖ pieces in hand: 歩

9	8	7	6	5	4	3	2	1
									1
			金						2
歩	歩		王	歩	全	馬	龍	歩	3
		歩	金						4
			歩						5
		歩							6
歩	歩		歩	歩	歩	歩		歩	7
									8
香	桂	銀	金	玉	金		桂	香	9

☗ pieces in hand: 歩歩歩
11...G-52 12.R-23+ G-64 13.+Sx43 G-62 14.B-33+

continued
☖ pieces in hand: 歩

9	8	7	6	5	4	3	2	1
				馬					1
			金			龍			2
歩			王	歩	全			歩	3
	歩		金						4
		歩	歩						5
		歩							6
歩	歩		歩	歩	歩	歩		歩	7
									8
香	桂	銀	金	玉	金		桂	香	9

☗ pieces in hand: 歩歩歩
14...P-84 15.+B-51 P-75 16.+R-32
The Chase
☖ pieces in hand: 歩

9	8	7	6	5	4	3	2	1
				馬					1
									2
歩		金		龍	全			歩	3
	歩		金	王					4
		歩	歩						5
		歩							6
歩	歩		歩	歩	歩	歩		歩	7
									8
香	桂	銀	金	玉	金		桂	香	9

☗ pieces in hand: 歩歩歩歩
16...G-73 17.+R-62 K-54 18.+R-53

Checkmate
☖ pieces in hand: 歩

9	8	7	6	5	4	3	2	1
				馬					1
									2
歩		金			全			歩	3
	歩		金		龍				4
		歩	歩		王				5
		歩							6
歩	歩		歩	歩	歩	歩		歩	7
									8
香	桂	銀	金	玉	金		桂	香	9

☗ pieces in hand: 歩歩歩歩
18...K-45 19.+R-44 投了

==== ☖K-42 ====
K-42
☖ pieces in hand: –

9	8	7	6	5	4	3	2	1
									1
		金			王	金			2
歩	歩	歩	歩	歩	歩	歩	歩	歩	3
									4
									5
		歩					歩		6
歩	歩		歩	歩	歩	歩		歩	7
	角						飛		8
香	桂	銀	金	玉	金	銀	桂	香	9

☗ pieces in hand: –
3...K-42
Climbing Silver
☖ pieces in hand: –

9	8	7	6	5	4	3	2	1
									1
						金	王		2
歩	歩	歩	金	歩	歩	歩	歩	歩	3
									4
			歩			銀	歩		5
		歩							6
歩	歩		歩	歩	歩	歩		歩	7
	角						飛		8
香	桂	銀	金	玉	金		桂	香	9

☗ pieces in hand: –
4.P-25 K-31 5.S-38 P-64 6.S-27 P-65 7.S-26 G-63 8.S-35 K-22

In this variation, White uses his king more defensively by moving it to the left side of board in order to support the defensive left gold. This means that White will be moving his king to where Black's Climbing Silver attack will occur (Shoshi 2000). Black's next seven moves (4.P-25, 5.S-38, 6.S-27, 7.S-26, 8.S-35, 9.P-24 Px24 10.Sx24) are the same (whereas White's moves differ).

3...K-42 4.P-25 K-31 5.S-38 P-64 6.S-27 P-65 7.S-26 G-63 8.S-35 K-22.

Second File Attack
☖ pieces in hand: 銀

9	8	7	6	5	4	3	2	1
									1
							王		2
歩	歩	歩	金	歩	歩	歩	金	歩	3
							歩		4
			歩						5
		歩							6
歩	歩		歩	歩	歩	歩		歩	7
	角						飛		8
香	桂	銀	金	玉	金		桂	香	9

☗ pieces in hand: 歩
9.P-24 Px24 10.Sx24 P*23 11.Sx23+ Gx23 12.P*24
Second File Attack
☖ pieces in hand: 銀

9	8	7	6	5	4	3	2	1
									1
							王		2
歩	歩	歩	金	歩	歩	歩	歩	歩	3
									4
			歩				飛		5
		歩							6
歩	歩		歩	歩	歩	歩		歩	7
	角								8
香	桂	銀	金	玉	金		桂	香	9

☗ pieces in hand: 金歩
12...Gx24 13.Rx24 P*23 14.R-25

9.P-24 Px24 10.Sx24 P*23 11.Sx23+ Gx23 12.P*24 Gx24 13.Rx24 P*23 14.R-25.

Forced Mate
☖ pieces in hand: 角

9	8	7	6	5	4	3	2	1
			王						1
		銀				龍			2
歩	歩	歩		歩	金			歩	3
				金					4
			歩						5
		歩							6
歩	歩		歩	歩	歩	歩		歩	7
									8
香	桂	銀	金	玉	金		桂	香	9

☗ pieces in hand: 歩歩歩歩
20...K-61 21.S*72
Checkmate
☖ pieces in hand: 角

9	8	7	6	5	4	3	2	1
				王					1
		銀		龍					2
歩	歩	歩		歩	金			歩	3
				金					4
			歩						5
		歩							6
歩	歩		歩	歩	歩	歩		歩	7
									8
香	桂	銀	金	玉	金		桂	香	9

☗ pieces in hand: 歩歩歩歩
21...K-51 22.+R-52 投了

=== Edge attack ===
Another strategy for Black is an edge attack.

=== Rook-34 variation ===
Fairbairn variation
☖ pieces in hand: –

9	8	7	6	5	4	3	2	1
				王					1
	金					金			2
歩	歩	歩	歩	歩	歩	歩	歩	歩	3
									4
									5
		歩	角						6
歩	歩		歩	歩	歩	歩	歩	歩	7
							飛		8
香	桂	銀	金	玉	金	銀	桂	香	9

☗ pieces in hand: –
3.B-66 G-82
Fairbairn variation
☖ pieces in hand: –

9	8	7	6	5	4	3	2	1
									1
	金				王	金			2
歩	歩	歩	歩	歩	歩	歩	歩	歩	3
									4
							歩		5
		歩	角						6
歩	歩		歩	歩	歩	歩		歩	7
							飛		8
香	桂	銀	金	玉	金	銀	桂	香	9

☗ pieces in hand: –
4.P-26 K-42 5.P-25

Yet another possibility is recommended by Fairbairn (1981) for Static Rook attack in which Black moves their rook sideways to the third file.

Fairbairn variation
☖ pieces in hand: –

9	8	7	6	5	4	3	2	1
						王			1
	金					金			2
歩	歩	歩	歩	歩	歩	歩	歩	歩	3
									4
							歩		5
		歩	角			歩			6
歩	歩		歩	歩	歩			歩	7
							飛		8
香	桂	銀	金	玉	金	銀	桂	香	9

☗ pieces in hand: –
5...K-31 6.P-36
Fairbairn variation
☖ pieces in hand: –

9	8	7	6	5	4	3	2	1
									1
	金					金	王		2
歩	歩	歩	歩	歩	歩	歩	歩	歩	3
									4
						歩	歩		5
		歩	角						6
歩	歩		歩	歩	歩			歩	7
							飛		8
香	桂	銀	金	玉	金	銀	桂	香	9

☗ pieces in hand: –
6...K-22 7.P-35

Fairbairn variation
☖ pieces in hand: –

9	8	7	6	5	4	3	2	1
									1
	金					金		王	2
歩	歩	歩	歩	歩	歩	歩	歩	歩	3
									4
						歩	歩		5
		歩	角						6
歩	歩		歩	歩	歩			歩	7
							飛		8
香	桂	銀	金	玉	金	銀	桂	香	9

☗ pieces in hand: –
7...K-22
Fairbairn variation
☖ pieces in hand: –

9	8	7	6	5	4	3	2	1
									1
	金					金		王	2
歩	歩	歩	歩	歩	歩	歩	歩	歩	3
						歩			4
							歩		5
		歩	角						6
歩	歩		歩	歩	歩			歩	7
							飛		8
香	桂	銀	金	玉	金	銀	桂	香	9

☗ pieces in hand: –
8.P-34

Fairbairn variation
☖ pieces in hand: 歩

9	8	7	6	5	4	3	2	1
									1
	金					金		王	2
歩	歩	歩	歩	歩	歩		歩	歩	3
						歩	歩		4
									5
		歩	角						6
歩	歩		歩	歩	歩			歩	7
							飛		8
香	桂	銀	金	玉	金	銀	桂	香	9

☗ pieces in hand: –
8...Px34 9.P-24
Fairbairn variation
☖ pieces in hand: 歩歩

9	8	7	6	5	4	3	2	1
									1
	金					金		王	2
歩	歩	歩	歩	歩	歩			歩	3
						歩	歩		4
									5
		歩	角						6
歩	歩		歩	歩	歩			歩	7
							飛		8
香	桂	銀	金	玉	金	銀	桂	香	9

☗ pieces in hand: –
9...Px24

Fairbairn variation
☖ pieces in hand: 歩歩

9	8	7	6	5	4	3	2	1
									1
	金					金		王	2
歩	歩	歩	歩	歩	歩			歩	3
						歩	飛		4
									5
		歩	角						6
歩	歩		歩	歩	歩			歩	7
									8
香	桂	銀	金	玉	金	銀	桂	香	9

☗ pieces in hand: 歩
10.Rx24
Fairbairn variation
☖ pieces in hand: 歩歩

9	8	7	6	5	4	3	2	1
									1
	金					金		王	2
歩	歩	歩	歩	歩	歩		歩	歩	3
						歩	飛		4
									5
		歩	角						6
歩	歩		歩	歩	歩			歩	7
									8
香	桂	銀	金	玉	金	銀	桂	香	9

☗ pieces in hand: 歩
10...P*23

Fairbairn variation
☖ pieces in hand: 歩歩

9	8	7	6	5	4	3	2	1
									1
	金					金		王	2
歩	歩	歩	歩	歩	歩	歩	歩	歩	3
						歩	飛		4
									5
		歩	角						6
歩	歩		歩	歩	歩			歩	7
									8
香	桂	銀	金	玉	金	銀	桂	香	9

☗ pieces in hand: 歩
11.P*33
Fairbairn variation
☖ pieces in hand: 歩歩

9	8	7	6	5	4	3	2	1
									1
	金				金			王	2
歩	歩	歩	歩	歩	歩	歩	歩	歩	3
						飛			4
									5
		歩	角						6
歩	歩		歩	歩	歩			歩	7
									8
香	桂	銀	金	玉	金	銀	桂	香	9

☗ pieces in hand: 歩
11...G-42 12.Rx34

== See also ==
- Handicap (shogi)
- 9-Piece handicap
- 6-Piece handicap
- Shogi opening

== Bibliography ==
- Fairbairn, John (1981). "Eight pieces (or how a sideways rook can make you a better person)". Shogi (33): 4–5.
- Hosking, Tony (1996). The art of shogi. The Shogi Foundation. ISBN 978-0-95310-890-9.
- 石橋, 幸緒 [Sachio Ishibashi] (2012). "最後に、「八枚落ち」に挑戦です". 石橋幸緒の駒落ちレシピ. 長崎出版.
- 影山, 稔雄 [Toshio Kageyama]; 木村, 義雄 [Yoshio Kimura] (1955). 将棋駒落の指し方. 大泉書店. pp. 26–32.
- 所司, 和晴 [Kazuharu Shoshi] (2000). 駒落ち定跡. 毎日コミュニケーションズ. ISBN 4-8197-0209-2.
