= El cristal empañado =

Mexican telenovela

- Genre: Telenovela
- Created by: Héctor Iglesias
- Written by: Eduardo Quiroga; Lorena Salazar; Xuitlaltzin Vázquez
- Directed by: José Rendón; Simón Bross
- Starring: Mariagna Prats; Jaime Garza; Magda Guzmán; Leticia Perdigón; Dina de Marco; Manuel Landeta; Diana Golden
- Theme music composer: Álvaro Eugenio; Marcos Deli
- Opening theme: El cristal empañado
- Country of origin: Mexico
- Original language: Spanish
- No. of episodes: 83

Production
- Executive producer: José Rendón
- Production locations: Mexico City, D.F., Mexico
- Cinematography: Jorge Miguel Valdés
- Running time: 41-44 minutes
- Production company: Televisa

Original release
- Network: Canal de las Estrellas
- Release: February 20 – June 16, 1989

Related
- Flor y canela; Las grandes aguas

El cristal empañado (English title: The fogged crystal) is a Mexican telenovela produced by José Rendón for Televisa in 1989.

Mariagna Prats and Jaime Garza starred as protagonists, while Magda Guzmán starred as main antagonist.

== Plot ==
The story focuses specifically on the life of two women, Paulina, and Virginia who are also raw. Virginia is a woman more, bitter and envious since childhood of the attributes of his cousin, once famous and now decaying vedette. Virginia lives with his daughter Mercedes of butted in the House of Paulina. As well as Virginia seek every day find way utterly destroy his cousin, Paulina is passed the depressed life and longing for their glorious past. It has come to cover the mirrors in his house by the asco causing him to look like it is now, and just look at their posters which appeared in his best years, radiant and beautiful dancing in cabarets of first category.

== Cast ==
- Mariagna Prats as Raquel/Yolanda
- Jaime Garza as Jacinto
- Magda Guzmán as Virginia
- Dina de Marco as Paulina
- Leticia Perdigón as Mercedes
- Manuel Landeta as Claudio
- Diana Golden as Alicia
- Meche Barba as Yolanda
- Héctor Cruz Lara as Mario
- Fernando Sáenz as Adrián
- Magda Karina as Luisa
- Karina Duprez as Karla
- Graciela Lara as Josefina
- Jazmín Athie as Maribel
- Yoshio as Comandante Molina
- Laura Forastieri as Isabel
- Fidel Garriga as Salazar
- Francisco Avendaño as Arturo
- Carmen Delgado as Marisela
- Mónica Prado as Eugenia
- Alicia Osorio as Amparo
- Maripaz Banquells as Paulina (young)
- Javier Díaz Dueñas as Leopoldo
- Rafael Banquells as Luciano
- Manuel Servín as Dr. Barrera
