= Handicap (shogi) =

Handicap Game
uwate
☖ pieces in hand: –

9	8	7	6	5	4	3	2	1
			金	王	金				1
									2
歩	歩	歩	歩	歩	歩	歩	歩	歩	3
									4
									5
									6
歩	歩	歩	歩	歩	歩	歩	歩	歩	7
	角						飛		8
香	桂	銀	金	玉	金	銀	桂	香	9

☗ pieces in hand: –
shitate

In shogi, a handicap game (駒落戦 koma ochisen, 駒落ち koma ochi, ハンデキャップ handekyappu, 手合割 teaiwari) is a game setup used between players of disparate strengths, in which one or more pieces are removed from the stronger player's side. (Note that the missing pieces are not available for drops and play no further part in the game.)

In Japanese, the higher ranked player is called 上手 uwate "handicapped player" while the lower player is 下手 shitate "lower player." These terms are usually translated in English simply as White and Black, respectively just like the way 後手 gote and 先手 sente are translated as White and Black, respectively.

The imbalance created by this method of handicapping is not as strong as it is in western chess because material advantage is not as powerful in shogi.

An even game (that is, a non-handicap game) is known as 平手 hirate in Japanese.

== Culture, tradition, pedagogy ==
In comparison with western chess, the attitude toward handicaps in shogi is quite different. Since shogi is arguably better suited for handicap play as captured pieces change sides, there is a strong tradition within shogi pedagogy for learning strategies appropriate to handicap games. Thus, most handicap games have been researched in detail and have developed traditional josekis (駒落ち定跡). Additionally, there are systems for determining what is the appropriate level of handicap to give players based on either the formal rank and/or skill level. (See §Handicaps and player rank below for the official system currently used by the Japan Shogi Association.)

In traditional shogi instruction, handicap games are still commonly used in developing skills for amateur players – particularly in determining how to balance defense and offensive (since the attacking power of Black is greater as the handicap increases). Additionally, handicap games have also traditionally been played between top ranked professional players and lower ranked professional players. Historically, handicap games were even played between top level professionals. For example, a Lance Handicap game between Kōzō Masuda and Meijin Yasuharu Ōyama for the 1956 Osho title is famous. According to the rules at the time (since changed), Masuda was required to give Ōyama a handicap since he had won the previous three even games. Nowadays, handicaps between 4-dan and above professionals are uncommon as shogi tournament practice has become more standardized. Most current handicaps between professionals are now Lance handicaps.

== Rules ==
In traditional handicap games, the stronger player (White/uwate) always has the first move except for the sente handicap.

If a jishogi (持将棋 jishōgi "impasse") occurs in a handicap game, the removed pieces are counted towards White's total.

In practice, professional players playing against an amateur may also have a time handicap as well (that is, shorter time control than the amateur).

In modern book diagrams, the White player is usually shown as the top player even though White has first move. (Usually book diagrams show the 先手 sente player with first move at the bottom of the board.)

In western shogi notation, the first pair of moves is shown with the shitate player's move replaced by an ellipsis. For example: 1...G-42 2.P-76 G-72.

== Types of handicap games ==
=== Official handicaps ===
In even games, which player has the first move is always determined by a pawn toss (振り駒 furigoma).

Lance
☖ pieces in hand: –

9	8	7	6	5	4	3	2	1
香	桂	銀	金	王	金	銀	桂		1
	飛						角		2
歩	歩	歩	歩	歩	歩	歩	歩	歩	3
									4
									5
									6
歩	歩	歩	歩	歩	歩	歩	歩	歩	7
	角						飛		8
香	桂	銀	金	玉	金	銀	桂	香	9

☗ pieces in hand: –
Bishop
☖ pieces in hand: –

9	8	7	6	5	4	3	2	1
香	桂	銀	金	王	金	銀	桂	香	1
	飛								2
歩	歩	歩	歩	歩	歩	歩	歩	歩	3
									4
									5
									6
歩	歩	歩	歩	歩	歩	歩	歩	歩	7
	角						飛		8
香	桂	銀	金	玉	金	銀	桂	香	9

☗ pieces in hand: –
Rook
☖ pieces in hand: –

9	8	7	6	5	4	3	2	1
香	桂	銀	金	王	金	銀	桂	香	1
							角		2
歩	歩	歩	歩	歩	歩	歩	歩	歩	3
									4
									5
									6
歩	歩	歩	歩	歩	歩	歩	歩	歩	7
	角						飛		8
香	桂	銀	金	玉	金	銀	桂	香	9

☗ pieces in hand: –

Rook–Lance
☖ pieces in hand: –

9	8	7	6	5	4	3	2	1
香	桂	銀	金	王	金	銀	桂		1
							角		2
歩	歩	歩	歩	歩	歩	歩	歩	歩	3
									4
									5
									6
歩	歩	歩	歩	歩	歩	歩	歩	歩	7
	角						飛		8
香	桂	銀	金	玉	金	銀	桂	香	9

☗ pieces in hand: –
2-Piece
☖ pieces in hand: –

9	8	7	6	5	4	3	2	1
香	桂	銀	金	王	金	銀	桂	香	1
									2
歩	歩	歩	歩	歩	歩	歩	歩	歩	3
									4
									5
									6
歩	歩	歩	歩	歩	歩	歩	歩	歩	7
	角						飛		8
香	桂	銀	金	玉	金	銀	桂	香	9

☗ pieces in hand: –

4-Piece
☖ pieces in hand: –

9	8	7	6	5	4	3	2	1
	桂	銀	金	王	金	銀	桂		1
									2
歩	歩	歩	歩	歩	歩	歩	歩	歩	3
									4
									5
									6
歩	歩	歩	歩	歩	歩	歩	歩	歩	7
	角						飛		8
香	桂	銀	金	玉	金	銀	桂	香	9

☗ pieces in hand: –
6-Piece
☖ pieces in hand: –

9	8	7	6	5	4	3	2	1
		銀	金	王	金	銀			1
									2
歩	歩	歩	歩	歩	歩	歩	歩	歩	3
									4
									5
									6
歩	歩	歩	歩	歩	歩	歩	歩	歩	7
	角						飛		8
香	桂	銀	金	玉	金	銀	桂	香	9

☗ pieces in hand: –

Therefore, the first handicap given to the lower-ranked player is for that player to always have first move as Black (先手 sente) instead of using a pawn toss. The reason for this is that there is a very slight statistical advantage for the Black player in professional games.

All further handicaps involve removing one or more pieces from the uwate player. Handicaps, in increasing order of severity, include the following:

English	Japanese		Omitted piece(s)
Black	先手	sente	no pieces omitted, but shitate always goes first
Lance	香落ち	kyō ochi	left lance
Bishop	角落ち	kaku ochi	bishop
Rook	飛車落ち	hisha ochi	rook
Rook–Lance	飛香落ち	hi-kyō ochi	rook, left lance
2-Piece	二枚落ち	ni-mai ochi	rook, bishop
4-Piece	四枚落ち	yon-mai ochi	rook, bishop, both lances
6-Piece	六枚落ち	roku-mai ochi	rook, bishop, both lances, both knights

The 6-Piece handicap is very large and is estimated to be the equivalent of Queen odds (queen removed) in western chess or a 9-stone handicap in go.

=== Pedagogical handicaps ===
8-Piece
☖ pieces in hand: –

9	8	7	6	5	4	3	2	1
			金	王	金				1
									2
歩	歩	歩	歩	歩	歩	歩	歩	歩	3
									4
									5
									6
歩	歩	歩	歩	歩	歩	歩	歩	歩	7
	角						飛		8
香	桂	銀	金	玉	金	銀	桂	香	9

☗ pieces in hand: –
9-Piece
☖ pieces in hand: –

9	8	7	6	5	4	3	2	1
			金	王					1
									2
歩	歩	歩	歩	歩	歩	歩	歩	歩	3
									4
									5
									6
歩	歩	歩	歩	歩	歩	歩	歩	歩	7
	角						飛		8
香	桂	銀	金	玉	金	銀	桂	香	9

☗ pieces in hand: –
10-Piece
☖ pieces in hand: –

9	8	7	6	5	4	3	2	1
				王					1
									2
歩	歩	歩	歩	歩	歩	歩	歩	歩	3
									4
									5
									6
歩	歩	歩	歩	歩	歩	歩	歩	歩	7
	角						飛		8
香	桂	銀	金	玉	金	銀	桂	香	9

☗ pieces in hand: –

Three Pawns
☖ pieces in hand: 歩歩歩

9	8	7	6	5	4	3	2	1
				王					1
									2
									3
									4
									5
									6
歩	歩	歩	歩	歩	歩	歩	歩	歩	7
	角						飛		8
香	桂	銀	金	玉	金	銀	桂	香	9

☗ pieces in hand: –
Naked King
☖ pieces in hand: –

9	8	7	6	5	4	3	2	1
				王					1
									2
									3
									4
									5
									6
歩	歩	歩	歩	歩	歩	歩	歩	歩	7
	角						飛		8
香	桂	銀	金	玉	金	銀	桂	香	9

☗ pieces in hand: –

Handicaps greater than 6-Piece are typically used when teaching the game to new players. The standard handicap games 8-Piece and less have josekis associated with them.

English	Japanese		Omitted piece(s)
8-Piece	八枚落ち	hachi-mai ochi	rook, bishop, both lances, both knights, both silvers
9-Piece	九枚落ち	kyū-mai ochi	rook, bishop, both lances, both knights, both silvers, left gold
10-Piece	十枚落ち	jū-mai ochi	rook, bishop, both lances, both knights, both silvers, both golds
Three Pawns	歩三兵	fu sanbyō	all pieces except king and three pawns in hand
Naked King	裸玉	hadaka gyoku	all pieces except king

=== Uncommon handicaps ===
3-Piece
☖ pieces in hand: –

9	8	7	6	5	4	3	2	1
	桂	銀	金	王	金	銀	桂	香	1
									2
歩	歩	歩	歩	歩	歩	歩	歩	歩	3
									4
									5
									6
歩	歩	歩	歩	歩	歩	歩	歩	歩	7
	角						飛		8
香	桂	銀	金	玉	金	銀	桂	香	9

☗ pieces in hand: –
5-Piece
☖ pieces in hand: –

9	8	7	6	5	4	3	2	1
		銀	金	王	金	銀	桂		1
									2
歩	歩	歩	歩	歩	歩	歩	歩	歩	3
									4
									5
									6
歩	歩	歩	歩	歩	歩	歩	歩	歩	7
	角						飛		8
香	桂	銀	金	玉	金	銀	桂	香	9

☗ pieces in hand: –
7-Piece
☖ pieces in hand: –

9	8	7	6	5	4	3	2	1
		銀	金	王	金				1
									2
歩	歩	歩	歩	歩	歩	歩	歩	歩	3
									4
									5
									6
歩	歩	歩	歩	歩	歩	歩	歩	歩	7
	角						飛		8
香	桂	銀	金	玉	金	銀	桂	香	9

☗ pieces in hand: –

The 3-Piece, 5-Piece, and 7-Piece handicaps are not commonly used. However, all have historically received joseki treatment.

Kaufman thinks the difference 2-Piece and 4-Piece is not so large as to make the 3-Piece useful.

Although the 5-Piece is uncommon, according to Kaufman, many professionals nevertheless feel that the 5-Piece is useful as there is a very large difference between 4-Piece and 6-Piece handicaps. There is a variant of the 5-Piece that omits the left knight instead of the right. Kaufman notes that 5-Piece left is significantly larger than 5-Piece right, because both Black major pieces point towards White's left flank.

English	Japanese		Omitted piece(s)
3-Piece	三枚落ち	san-mai ochi	rook, bishop, right lance
5-Piece	五枚落ち	go-mai ochi	rook, bishop, both lances, either knight (usually right knight)
7-Piece	七枚落ち	nana-mai ochi	rook, bishop, both lances, both knights, left silver

5-Piece Left Knight
☖ pieces in hand: –

9	8	7	6	5	4	3	2	1
	桂	銀	金	王	金	銀			1
									2
歩	歩	歩	歩	歩	歩	歩	歩	歩	3
									4
									5
									6
歩	歩	歩	歩	歩	歩	歩	歩	歩	7
	角						飛		8
香	桂	銀	金	玉	金	銀	桂	香	9

☗ pieces in hand: –
Right Lance
☖ pieces in hand: –

9	8	7	6	5	4	3	2	1
	桂	銀	金	王	金	銀	桂	香	1
	飛						角		2
歩	歩	歩	歩	歩	歩	歩	歩	歩	3
									4
									5
									6
歩	歩	歩	歩	歩	歩	歩	歩	歩	7
	角						飛		8
香	桂	銀	金	玉	金	銀	桂	香	9

☗ pieces in hand: –

The Right Lance handicap (右香落ち) became obsolete officially since 1910. There are many historical Right Lance handicap game records dating back to the Edo period. The Right Lance handicap is smaller than the currently official (left) Lance handicap.

Right Silver
☖ pieces in hand: –

9	8	7	6	5	4	3	2	1
香	桂		金	王	金	銀	桂	香	1
	飛						角		2
歩	歩	歩	歩	歩	歩	歩	歩	歩	3
									4
									5
									6
歩	歩	歩	歩	歩	歩	歩	歩	歩	7
	角						飛		8
香	桂	銀	金	玉	金	銀	桂	香	9

☗ pieces in hand: –
Left Silver
☖ pieces in hand: –

9	8	7	6	5	4	3	2	1
香	桂	銀	金	王	金		桂	香	1
	飛						角		2
歩	歩	歩	歩	歩	歩	歩	歩	歩	3
									4
									5
									6
歩	歩	歩	歩	歩	歩	歩	歩	歩	7
	角						飛		8
香	桂	銀	金	玉	金	銀	桂	香	9

☗ pieces in hand: –

The Silver handicaps are unofficial handicaps designed to be a little larger than the distance between an even game and a Lance handicap. The strategy used in these games is often quite similar to even games.

Double Lance
☖ pieces in hand: –

9	8	7	6	5	4	3	2	1
	桂	銀	金	王	金	銀	桂		1
	飛						角		2
歩	歩	歩	歩	歩	歩	歩	歩	歩	3
									4
									5
									6
歩	歩	歩	歩	歩	歩	歩	歩	歩	7
	角						飛		8
香	桂	銀	金	玉	金	銀	桂	香	9

☗ pieces in hand: –
Rook–Silver
☖ pieces in hand: –

9	8	7	6	5	4	3	2	1
香	桂	銀	金	王	金		桂	香	1
							角		2
歩	歩	歩	歩	歩	歩	歩	歩	歩	3
									4
									5
									6
歩	歩	歩	歩	歩	歩	歩	歩	歩	7
	角						飛		8
香	桂	銀	金	玉	金	銀	桂	香	9

☗ pieces in hand: –

Other uncommon ones occasionally seen include Double Lance (両者) and Rook–Silver handicaps.

Dragonfly
☖ pieces in hand: –

9	8	7	6	5	4	3	2	1
				王					1
	飛						角		2
歩	歩	歩	歩	歩	歩	歩	歩	歩	3
									4
									5
									6
歩	歩	歩	歩	歩	歩	歩	歩	歩	7
	角						飛		8
香	桂	銀	金	玉	金	銀	桂	香	9

☗ pieces in hand: –
Dragonfly with Lances
☖ pieces in hand: –

9	8	7	6	5	4	3	2	1
香				王				香	1
	飛						角		2
歩	歩	歩	歩	歩	歩	歩	歩	歩	3
									4
									5
									6
歩	歩	歩	歩	歩	歩	歩	歩	歩	7
	角						飛		8
香	桂	銀	金	玉	金	銀	桂	香	9

☗ pieces in hand: –
Dragonfly With Lances, Knights
☖ pieces in hand: –

9	8	7	6	5	4	3	2	1
香	桂			王			桂	香	1
	飛						角		2
歩	歩	歩	歩	歩	歩	歩	歩	歩	3
									4
									5
									6
歩	歩	歩	歩	歩	歩	歩	歩	歩	7
	角						飛		8
香	桂	銀	金	玉	金	銀	桂	香	9

☗ pieces in hand: –

The Dragonfly (トンボ) handicaps can be found in some mobile apps and online playing sites (such as 81Dojo). It may be a useful handicap to learn about beneficial piece exchanges.

==== Taikō Shogi ====
Taikō Shogi
☖ pieces in hand: –

9	8	7	6	5	4	3	2	1
香	桂	銀	金	王	金	銀	桂	香	1
	飛						角		2
歩	歩	歩	歩	歩	歩	歩	歩	歩	3
									4
									5
									6
歩	歩	歩	歩	歩	歩	歩		歩	7
	角						飛		8
香	桂	銀	金	玉	金	銀	桂	香	9

☗ pieces in hand: –
Black to move.

Taikō Shogi (太閤将棋) is a variant of shogi in which Black omits their rook pawn on the second file. This configuration allows Black to immediately promote their rook on the first move simultaneously obtaining a pawn in hand (that is, 1.Rx23+). Thus, Taikō Shogi is essentially a type of handicap game with Shitate having the first move and missing a piece instead of Uwate having both of those properties. The handicap is fairly large, approximately equivalent to a 2-Piece handicap.

==== Computer shogi handicaps ====
Two Promotions
☖ pieces in hand: –

9	8	7	6	5	4	3	2	1
香	桂	銀	金	王	金	銀	桂	香	1
	飛						角		2
歩	歩	歩	歩	歩	歩	歩	歩	歩	3
									4
									5
									6
歩	歩	歩	歩	歩	歩	歩	歩	歩	7
	馬						龍		8
香	桂	銀	金	玉	金	銀	桂	香	9

☗ pieces in hand: –
Black to move.
Dragon
☖ pieces in hand: 歩

9	8	7	6	5	4	3	2	1
香	桂	銀	金	王	金	銀	桂	香	1
	飛						角		2
歩	歩	歩	歩	歩	歩	歩	歩	歩	3
									4
									5
									6
歩	歩	歩	歩	歩	歩	歩		歩	7
	角						飛		8
香	桂	銀	金	玉	金	銀	桂	香	9

☗ pieces in hand: –
Black to move.

In 2017 in computer shogi, two new handicaps were invented for challenging shogi engines to defeat the reigning champion engine, Ponanza (ポナンザ). In these handicaps, Shitate moves first.

The Two Promotions (両成) handicap has the configuration of an even game except with Shitate's rook and bishop already promoted in the start position. Two Promotions was evaluated as being similar to a Rook handicap.

The Dragon (竜王) handicap is derived from the Taikō Shogi configuration (mentioned directly above) except with Shitate's missing rook pawn being placed in Uwate's hand instead of being omitted from the game. This setup does allow Shitate to promote their rook into a dragon on their first move and obtain a pawn in head like in Taikō Shogi. However, unlike Taikō Shogi, Uwate has a pawn in hand that can be dropped for defense (that is, 1.Rx23+ G-32 2.+R-28 P*23), which is a much less severe handicap compared with Taikō Shogi. It is evaluated as being similar to a Bishop handicap.

=== Piece-in-hand handicaps ===
2-Piece In-Hand
☖ pieces in hand: –

9	8	7	6	5	4	3	2	1
香	桂	銀	金	王	金	銀	桂	香	1
									2
歩	歩	歩	歩	歩	歩	歩	歩	歩	3
									4
									5
									6
歩	歩	歩	歩	歩	歩	歩	歩	歩	7
	角						飛		8
香	桂	銀	金	玉	金	銀	桂	香	9

☗ pieces in hand: 飛 角

Piece-in-hand handicaps (駒持ち) are a newer nontraditional type of handicap where instead of taking the pieces from the stronger player's side and removing them from the game the pieces taken are given to the weaker player to put in their hand so that they may be used for drops as early as the weaker player's first move. Just as with traditional handicaps, Piece-in-handicaps have Uwate making the first move. These handicaps may be used to teach new players to look for drop locations. Needless to say, giving White's pieces to Black to keep in hand creates much greater handicaps than compared with removing the same pieces from play as with traditional handicaps.

== Handicaps and player rank ==
The relationship between handicaps and differences in rank is not universally agreed upon, with several systems in use. The system used by the Japan Shogi Association at its headquarters in Tokyo the Shogi Kaikan is as follows:

- Difference of 1 rank: lower ranked player moves first
- Difference of 2 ranks: Lance
- Difference of 3 ranks: Bishop
- Difference of 4 ranks: Rook
- Difference of 5 ranks: Rook–Lance
- Difference of 6 or 7 ranks: 2-Piece
- Difference of 8 or 9 ranks: 4-Piece
- Difference of 10 or more ranks: 6-Piece

Note that these handicap–ranking systems are used for amateur players. Rank differences between professional players are actually smaller, and, therefore, the handicap–ranking systems used for amateurs is not appropriate. A professional 1-dan is estimated to be a little stronger than a 5-dan amateur player. Thus, a suitable handicap for a 1-dan professional playing against a 1-dan amateur is a difference in 5 ranks.

=== Historical systems ===
Earlier a different handicap–ranking system was used:

- Difference of 1 rank: Lance
- Difference of 2 ranks: Bishop
- Difference of 3 ranks: Rook
- Difference of 4 ranks: Rook–Lance
- Difference of 5 ranks: 2-Piece
- Difference of 6 ranks: Rook, Bishop, (left) Lance
- Difference of 7 ranks: 4-Piece
- Difference of 8 ranks: 5-Piece Left Knight
- Difference of 9 ranks: 6-Piece

== See also ==
- Shogi opening
- Handicap (chess)
- Handicap (xiangqi)

== Bibliography ==
- Fairbairn, John (1979). "Handicap series No. 1: Bishop handicap openings". Shogi (18): 10–14.
- Fairbairn, John (1979). "Handicap series No. 2: Rook handicap openings". Shogi (19): 10–12.
- Fairbairn, John (1979). "Handicap series No. 3: Rook and lance handicap openings". Shogi (20): 10–12.
- Fairbairn, John (1979). "Handicap series No. 4: Lance handicap openings". Shogi (21): 4–7.
- Fairbairn, John (1980). "Handicap series No. 8: Three pieces". Shogi (25): 18.
- Hodges, George, ed. (1976). "The ranking and handicap system in shogi". Shogi (2): 16.
- Hodges, George, ed. (1977). "Two-piece handicap game with Meijin Nakahara". Shogi (6). Translated by Fairbairn, John: 17–18.
- Hodges, George, ed. (1977). "Historical games: Intatsu versus Sōgin". Shogi (10). Translated by Fairbairn, John: 4–5. · Bishop handicap game from 1709
- Hodges, George, ed. (1978). "Historical games: No. 2". Shogi (14). Translated by Fairbairn, John: 4–8. · Lance handicap game from 1944
- Hodges, George, ed. (1979). "The handicap system: The biggest handicap of all". Shogi (21): 2.
- Hodges, George, ed. (1980). "Historical game: Right-hand lance handicap!". Shogi (23): 8.
- Hodges, George, ed. (1981). "Great talents mature late part one". Shogi (30): 10–13. · Right Lance handicap game from 1837 with commentary from Kunio Yonenaga
- Hodges, George, ed. (1981). "Great talents mature late part two". Shogi (31): 7–9. · (left) Lance handicap game from 1837 with commentary from Kunio Yonenaga
- Hodges, George, ed. (1981). "Yonenaga's first games in the west". Shogi (32): 2. · Rook and 2-Piece handicap games from 1981 with commentary from Teruichi Aono
- Hodges, George, ed. (1981). "Third London tournament". Shogi (32): 7–9, 14. · Rook, Rook & Lance, and 2-Piece handicap games from 1981 with commentary from Teruichi Aono
- Hodges, George, ed. (1981). "Great talents mature late part three". Shogi (32): 15–17. · Right Lance handicap game from 1937
- Hodges, George, ed. (1981). "Aono visits Netherlands". Shogi (32): 18. · Rook & Lance, 2-Piece, 4-Piece, and 6-Piece handicap games from 1981
- Hodges, George, ed. (1981). "Kaufman visits Japan". Shogi (33): 9. · Rook and 4-Piece handicap games from 1981 with commentary by Larry Kaufman
- Hodges, George, ed. (1981). "Great talents mature late part four". Shogi (33): 14–15, 17. · (left) Lance handicap game from 1837
- Hosking, Tony (1996). The art of shogi. The Shogi Foundation. ISBN 978-0-95310-890-9.
- Iida, Hiroyuki (1993). Shogi in Europe. Uniprint, University of Limburg. · annotated handicap games by a professional shogi player
- 影山, 稔雄 [Toshio Kageyama]; 木村, 義雄 [Yoshio Kimura] (1955). 将棋駒落の指し方. 大泉書店.
- Kitao, Madoka (2012). Edge attack at a glance. Translated by Kawasaki, Tomohide. Nekomado. ISBN 978-4-9052-2502-7.
- 鈴木, 宏彦 [Hirohiko Suzuki] [in Japanese]; 島, 朗 [Akira Shima] (1999). 81枡物語. 毎日コミュニケーションズ.
