= Ueki =

Ueki may refer to:

- Ueki (surname)
- Ueki, Kumamoto, a former town in Japan

== See also ==
- The Law of Ueki, manga series
