= 5-Piece handicap =

5-Piece
☖ pieces in hand: –

| 9 | 8 | 7 | 6 | 5 | 4 | 3 | 2 | 1 |
| | | 銀 | 金 | 王 | 金 | 銀 | 桂 | | 1 |
| | | | | | | | | | 2 |
| 歩 | 歩 | 歩 | 歩 | 歩 | 歩 | 歩 | 歩 | 歩 | 3 |
| | | | | | | | | | 4 |
| | | | | | | | | | 5 |
| | | | | | | | | | 6 |
| 歩 | 歩 | 歩 | 歩 | 歩 | 歩 | 歩 | 歩 | 歩 | 7 |
| | 角 | | | | | | 飛 | | 8 |
| 香 | 桂 | 銀 | 金 | 玉 | 金 | 銀 | 桂 | 香 | 9 |

☗ pieces in hand: –

The 5-Piece (五枚落ち gomai-ochi) or One Knight handicap in shogi has both of White's major pieces, the rook and the bishop, removed as well as their lances and right knight. Thus, White is left with pawns, golds, silvers, and the left knight.

Black has the usual setup of twenty pieces.

The 5-Piece handicap is not currently part of the Japan Shogi Association's official list of handicaps. It is also not commonly used.

Although uncommon, many professionals feel that the 5-Piece is useful as there is a very large difference between 4-Piece and 6-Piece handicaps according to Kaufman.

== Openings ==
=== Bishop-66 Opposing Rook variation ===
5-Piece
☖ pieces in hand: –

| 9 | 8 | 7 | 6 | 5 | 4 | 3 | 2 | 1 |
| | | 銀 | | 王 | 金 | 銀 | 桂 | | 1 |
| | | 金 | | | | | | | 2 |
| 歩 | 歩 | 歩 | 歩 | 歩 | 歩 | 歩 | 歩 | 歩 | 3 |
| | | | | | | | | | 4 |
| | | | | | | | | | 5 |
| | | | | | | | | | 6 |
| 歩 | 歩 | 歩 | 歩 | 歩 | 歩 | 歩 | 歩 | 歩 | 7 |
| | 角 | | | | | | 飛 | | 8 |
| 香 | 桂 | 銀 | 金 | 玉 | 金 | 銀 | 桂 | 香 | 9 |

☗ pieces in hand: –
1. ... G-72
5-Piece
☖ pieces in hand: –

| 9 | 8 | 7 | 6 | 5 | 4 | 3 | 2 | 1 |
| | | 銀 | | 王 | 金 | 銀 | 桂 | | 1 |
| | | 金 | | | | | | | 2 |
| 歩 | | 歩 | 歩 | 歩 | 歩 | 歩 | 歩 | 歩 | 3 |
| | 歩 | | | | | | | | 4 |
| | | | | | | | | | 5 |
| | | 歩 | | | | | | | 6 |
| 歩 | 歩 | | 歩 | 歩 | 歩 | 歩 | 歩 | 歩 | 7 |
| | 角 | | | | | | 飛 | | 8 |
| 香 | 桂 | 銀 | 金 | 玉 | 金 | 銀 | 桂 | 香 | 9 |

☗ pieces in hand: –
2. P-76 P-84

1...G-72. White opens with their right gold.

White is more free to focus on the right side of their board compared to the 6-Piece handicap since White's left camp has a stronger defense due to the addition of the left knight. In particular, the knight protects the 33 square from the beginning. So, when Black opens their bishop diagonal in which their bishop is attacking White's 33, White does not immediately need to move a general to defend that square. Similarly, the knight also protects the edge at 13 and does not require an immediate defense if Black's bishop is positioned to attack along the 79–13 diagonal (targeting the 13 square). Therefore, White's left silver and gold are more available to defend toward the center of the board.

2. P-76. Black opens their bishop diagonal activating their bishop.

2...P-84. White pushes their eighth file pawn forward in order to make way for their right gold.

5-Piece
☖ pieces in hand: –

| 9 | 8 | 7 | 6 | 5 | 4 | 3 | 2 | 1 |
| | | 銀 | | 王 | 金 | 銀 | 桂 | | 1 |
| | | | | | | | | | 2 |
| 歩 | 金 | 歩 | 歩 | 歩 | 歩 | 歩 | 歩 | 歩 | 3 |
| | 歩 | | | | | | | | 4 |
| | | | | | | | | | 5 |
| | | 歩 | 角 | | | | | | 6 |
| 歩 | 歩 | | 歩 | 歩 | 歩 | 歩 | 歩 | 歩 | 7 |
| | | | | | | | 飛 | | 8 |
| 香 | 桂 | 銀 | 金 | 玉 | 金 | 銀 | 桂 | 香 | 9 |

☗ pieces in hand: –
3. B-66 G-83
5-Piece
☖ pieces in hand: –

| 9 | 8 | 7 | 6 | 5 | 4 | 3 | 2 | 1 |
| | | | | 王 | 金 | 銀 | 桂 | | 1 |
| | 銀 | | | | | | | | 2 |
| 歩 | 金 | 歩 | 歩 | 歩 | 歩 | 歩 | 歩 | 歩 | 3 |
| | 歩 | | | | | | | | 4 |
| | | | | | | | | | 5 |
| | 歩 | 歩 | 角 | | | | | | 6 |
| 歩 | | | 歩 | 歩 | 歩 | 歩 | 歩 | 歩 | 7 |
| | | | | | | | 飛 | | 8 |
| 香 | 桂 | 銀 | 金 | 玉 | 金 | 銀 | 桂 | 香 | 9 |

☗ pieces in hand: –
4. P-86 S-82

3. B-66. Black moves their bishop to the sixth file in order to support an attack on Black's left side. The move also forces White to move their generals to this side.

3...G-83. White is forced to the defend the pawn on 84 as well as their right edge.

4. P-86. Black will develop an Opposing Rook attack up the eighth file, which the pawn push prepares for.

5-Piece
☖ pieces in hand: –

| 9 | 8 | 7 | 6 | 5 | 4 | 3 | 2 | 1 |
| | | | | 王 | 金 | 銀 | 桂 | | 1 |
| | 銀 | | | | | | | | 2 |
| 歩 | 金 | 歩 | 歩 | 歩 | 歩 | 歩 | 歩 | 歩 | 3 |
| | 歩 | | | | | | | | 4 |
| | | | | | | | | | 5 |
| | 歩 | 歩 | 角 | | | | | | 6 |
| 歩 | | | 歩 | 歩 | 歩 | 歩 | 歩 | 歩 | 7 |
| | 飛 | | | | | | | | 8 |
| 香 | 桂 | 銀 | 金 | 玉 | 金 | 銀 | 桂 | 香 | 9 |

☗ pieces in hand: –
5. R-88

5-Piece
☖ pieces in hand: –

| 9 | 8 | 7 | 6 | 5 | 4 | 3 | 2 | 1 |
| | | | | 王 | 金 | 銀 | 桂 | | 1 |
| | 銀 | | | | | | | | 2 |
| 歩 | 金 | 歩 | | 歩 | 歩 | 歩 | 歩 | 歩 | 3 |
| | 歩 | | 歩 | | | | | | 4 |
| | | | | | | | | | 5 |
| | 歩 | 歩 | 角 | 歩 | | | | | 6 |
| 歩 | | | 歩 | | 歩 | 歩 | 歩 | 歩 | 7 |
| | 飛 | | | | | | | | 8 |
| 香 | 桂 | 銀 | 金 | 玉 | 金 | 銀 | 桂 | 香 | 9 |

☗ pieces in hand: –
5. ... P-64
6. P-56 ...

5. R-88. Opposing Rook.

5...P-64. White pushes the sixth file pawn to prepare for an attack on the head of Black's bishop.

6. P-56. Black advances their central pawn in order to give their bishop a path of retreat (the 57 square) from White's encroaching pawn while still maintaining pressure on the right edge of White's camp.

== 5-Piece Left Knight handicap ==
5-Piece Left Knight
☖ pieces in hand: –

| 9 | 8 | 7 | 6 | 5 | 4 | 3 | 2 | 1 |
| | 桂 | 銀 | 金 | 王 | 金 | 銀 | | | 1 |
| | | | | | | | | | 2 |
| 歩 | 歩 | 歩 | 歩 | 歩 | 歩 | 歩 | 歩 | 歩 | 3 |
| | | | | | | | | | 4 |
| | | | | | | | | | 5 |
| | | | | | | | | | 6 |
| 歩 | 歩 | 歩 | 歩 | 歩 | 歩 | 歩 | 歩 | 歩 | 7 |
| | 角 | | | | | | 飛 | | 8 |
| 香 | 桂 | 銀 | 金 | 玉 | 金 | 銀 | 桂 | 香 | 9 |

☗ pieces in hand: –

The other five piece handicap is the left knight variant. It is the same as the more common handicap except with White's left knight removed instead of the right knight. (Thus, White plays with pawn, golds, silvers, and the right knight.)

According to Kaufman, this handicap is intermediate between the 6-Piece handicap and the usual 5-Piece (Right Knight) handicap mentioned above. It is a more severe handicap for White since Black's major pieces (the rook and bishop) are targeted toward White's left side. Therefore, removing White's left knight leaves White in a more vulnerable state compared to the Right Knight 5-Piece handicap.

== See also ==
- Handicap (shogi)
- Shogi opening

== Bibliography ==
- Fairbairn, John (1979). "Handicap series No. 5: Six piece handicap". Shogi (22): 6–7.
- Fairbairn, John (1980). "Handicap series No. 7: Five pieces". Shogi (25): 18.
- Kaufman, Larry (1983). "New ideas in handicap openings". Shogi (42): 13–15.
