= 2-Piece handicap =

Handicap in shogi

2-Piece
☖ pieces in hand: –

| 9 | 8 | 7 | 6 | 5 | 4 | 3 | 2 | 1 |
| 香 | 桂 | 銀 | 金 | 王 | 金 | 銀 | 桂 | 香 | 1 |
| | | | | | | | | | 2 |
| 歩 | 歩 | 歩 | 歩 | 歩 | 歩 | 歩 | 歩 | 歩 | 3 |
| | | | | | | | | | 4 |
| | | | | | | | | | 5 |
| | | | | | | | | | 6 |
| 歩 | 歩 | 歩 | 歩 | 歩 | 歩 | 歩 | 歩 | 歩 | 7 |
| | 角 | | | | | | 飛 | | 8 |
| 香 | 桂 | 銀 | 金 | 玉 | 金 | 銀 | 桂 | 香 | 9 |

☗ pieces in hand: –

The 2-Piece (二枚落ち nimai-ochi) handicap in shogi has both of White's major pieces (the rook and the bishop) removed. Thus, White is left with pawns, golds, silvers, knights, and lances.

Black has the usual setup of twenty pieces.

The 2-Piece handicap is an official handicap of the Japan Shogi Association.

== Openings ==
2-Piece
☖ pieces in hand: –

| 9 | 8 | 7 | 6 | 5 | 4 | 3 | 2 | 1 |
| 香 | 桂 | | 金 | 王 | 金 | 銀 | 桂 | 香 | 1 |
| | | | | | | | | | 2 |
| 歩 | 歩 | 歩 | 歩 | 銀 | 歩 | 歩 | 歩 | 歩 | 3 |
| | | | | 歩 | | | | | 4 |
| | | | | | 歩 | | | | 5 |
| | | 歩 | | | | | | | 6 |
| 歩 | 歩 | | 歩 | 歩 | | 歩 | 歩 | 歩 | 7 |
| | 角 | | | | | | 飛 | | 8 |
| 香 | 桂 | 銀 | 金 | 玉 | 金 | 銀 | 桂 | 香 | 9 |

☗ pieces in hand: –
3... S-53
4. P-45

2-Piece
☖ pieces in hand: –

| 9 | 8 | 7 | 6 | 5 | 4 | 3 | 2 | 1 |
| 香 | 桂 | | 金 | 王 | | 銀 | 桂 | 香 | 1 |
| | | | | | | 金 | | | 2 |
| 歩 | 歩 | 歩 | 歩 | 銀 | 歩 | 歩 | 歩 | 歩 | 3 |
| | | | | 歩 | | | | | 4 |
| | | | | | 歩 | | | | 5 |
| | | 歩 | | | | 歩 | | | 6 |
| 歩 | 歩 | | 歩 | 歩 | | | 歩 | 歩 | 7 |
| | 角 | | | | | | 飛 | | 8 |
| 香 | 桂 | 銀 | 金 | 玉 | 金 | 銀 | 桂 | 香 | 9 |

☗ pieces in hand: –
4... G-32
5. P-36

=== ☖5...K-52 ===
☖ pieces in hand: –

| 9 | 8 | 7 | 6 | 5 | 4 | 3 | 2 | 1 |
| 香 | 桂 | | 金 | | | 銀 | 桂 | 香 | 1 |
| | | | | 王 | | 金 | | | 2 |
| 歩 | 歩 | 歩 | 歩 | 銀 | 歩 | 歩 | 歩 | 歩 | 3 |
| | | | | 歩 | | | | | 4 |
| | | | | | 歩 | | | | 5 |
| | | 歩 | | | | 歩 | | | 6 |
| 歩 | 歩 | | 歩 | 歩 | | | 歩 | 歩 | 7 |
| | 角 | | | | | | 飛 | | 8 |
| 香 | 桂 | 銀 | 金 | 玉 | 金 | 銀 | 桂 | 香 | 9 |

☗ pieces in hand: –
5... K-52

☖ pieces in hand: –

| 9 | 8 | 7 | 6 | 5 | 4 | 3 | 2 | 1 |
| 香 | 桂 | | 金 | | | | 桂 | 香 | 1 |
| | | | | | | 金 | 銀 | | 2 |
| 歩 | 歩 | 歩 | 王 | 銀 | 歩 | 歩 | 歩 | 歩 | 3 |
| | | | 歩 | 歩 | | | | | 4 |
| | | | | | 歩 | 歩 | | | 5 |
| | | 歩 | | | | | | | 6 |
| 歩 | 歩 | | 歩 | 歩 | 銀 | | 歩 | 歩 | 7 |
| | 角 | | | | | | 飛 | | 8 |
| 香 | 桂 | 銀 | 金 | 玉 | 金 | | 桂 | 香 | 9 |

☗ pieces in hand: –
8... S-22

==== Two-Pawn Sacrifice Push ====
☖ pieces in hand: –

| 9 | 8 | 7 | 6 | 5 | 4 | 3 | 2 | 1 |
| 香 | 桂 | | 金 | | | | 桂 | 香 | 1 |
| | | | | | | 金 | 銀 | | 2 |
| 歩 | 歩 | 歩 | 王 | 銀 | 歩 | 歩 | 歩 | 歩 | 3 |
| | | | 歩 | 歩 | | | | | 4 |
| | | | | | 歩 | 歩 | | | 5 |
| | | 歩 | | | | | | | 6 |
| 歩 | 歩 | | 歩 | 歩 | 銀 | | 歩 | 歩 | 7 |
| | 角 | | | | | 飛 | | | 8 |
| 香 | 桂 | 銀 | 金 | 玉 | 金 | | 桂 | 香 | 9 |

☗ pieces in hand: –
9. R-38

☖ pieces in hand: –

| 9 | 8 | 7 | 6 | 5 | 4 | 3 | 2 | 1 |
| 香 | | | | | | | 桂 | 香 | 1 |
| | | | | | | 金 | 銀 | | 2 |
| 歩 | 歩 | 桂 | 王 | 銀 | 歩 | 歩 | 歩 | 歩 | 3 |
| | | 歩 | 金 | 歩 | | | | | 4 |
| | | | 歩 | | 歩 | | | | 5 |
| | | 歩 | | | | 飛 | | | 6 |
| 歩 | 歩 | | 歩 | 歩 | 銀 | 桂 | 歩 | 歩 | 7 |
| | 角 | 金 | 銀 | 金 | | | | | 8 |
| 香 | 桂 | | 玉 | | | | | 香 | 9 |

☗ pieces in hand: 歩
17. S-68

Two-Pawn Sacrifice Push (二歩突っ切り ni fu tsukkiri).

9. R-38. Black plays Sleeve Rook.

18. S-68. Black's Crab castle is complete.

==== Silver Tandem ====
☖ pieces in hand: –

| 9 | 8 | 7 | 6 | 5 | 4 | 3 | 2 | 1 |
| 香 | 桂 | | 金 | | | | 桂 | 香 | 1 |
| | | | | | | 金 | 銀 | | 2 |
| 歩 | 歩 | 歩 | 王 | 銀 | 歩 | 歩 | 歩 | 歩 | 3 |
| | | | 歩 | 歩 | | | | | 4 |
| | | | | | 歩 | 歩 | | | 5 |
| | | 歩 | | 歩 | | | | | 6 |
| 歩 | 歩 | | 歩 | | 銀 | | 歩 | 歩 | 7 |
| | 角 | | | | | | 飛 | | 8 |
| 香 | 桂 | 銀 | 金 | 玉 | 金 | | 桂 | 香 | 9 |

☗ pieces in hand: –
9. P-56

☖ pieces in hand: 歩

| 9 | 8 | 7 | 6 | 5 | 4 | 3 | 2 | 1 |
| 香 | | | | | | | 桂 | 香 | 1 |
| | | | | | | 金 | 銀 | | 2 |
| 歩 | | 桂 | 王 | 銀 | 歩 | 歩 | 歩 | 歩 | 3 |
| | | 金 | 歩 | 歩 | | | | | 4 |
| | 歩 | | | | 歩 | 歩 | | | 5 |
| | | | | 歩 | 銀 | | | | 6 |
| 歩 | 歩 | | 歩 | | 銀 | | 歩 | 歩 | 7 |
| | 角 | 金 | | 飛 | 金 | 玉 | | | 8 |
| 香 | 桂 | | | | | | 桂 | 香 | 9 |

☗ pieces in hand: 歩
fig.Silver Tandem

Silver Tandem (銀多伝 gin taden).

=== ☖5...P-55 ===
☖ pieces in hand: –

| 9 | 8 | 7 | 6 | 5 | 4 | 3 | 2 | 1 |
| 香 | 桂 | | 金 | 王 | | 銀 | 桂 | 香 | 1 |
| | | | | | | 金 | | | 2 |
| 歩 | 歩 | 歩 | 歩 | 銀 | 歩 | 歩 | 歩 | 歩 | 3 |
| | | | | | | | | | 4 |
| | | | | 歩 | 歩 | | | | 5 |
| | | 歩 | | | | 歩 | | | 6 |
| 歩 | 歩 | | 歩 | 歩 | | | 歩 | 歩 | 7 |
| | 角 | | | | | | 飛 | | 8 |
| 香 | 桂 | 銀 | 金 | 玉 | 金 | 銀 | 桂 | 香 | 9 |

☗ pieces in hand: –
5... P-55

☖ pieces in hand: –

| 9 | 8 | 7 | 6 | 5 | 4 | 3 | 2 | 1 |
| 香 | 桂 | | 金 | 王 | | | 桂 | 香 | 1 |
| | | | | | | 金 | | | 2 |
| 歩 | 歩 | 歩 | 歩 | | 歩 | 歩 | 歩 | 歩 | 3 |
| | | | 銀 | 銀 | | | | | 4 |
| | | | | 歩 | 歩 | | | | 5 |
| | | 歩 | | | 銀 | 歩 | | | 6 |
| 歩 | 歩 | | 歩 | 歩 | | | 歩 | 歩 | 7 |
| | 角 | | 銀 | | 飛 | | | | 8 |
| 香 | 桂 | | 金 | 玉 | 金 | | 桂 | 香 | 9 |

☗ pieces in hand: –
10. S-68

==== ☖10...K-52 ====
☖ pieces in hand: –

| 9 | 8 | 7 | 6 | 5 | 4 | 3 | 2 | 1 |
| 香 | 桂 | | 金 | | | | 桂 | 香 | 1 |
| | | | | 王 | | 金 | | | 2 |
| 歩 | 歩 | 歩 | 歩 | | 歩 | 歩 | 歩 | 歩 | 3 |
| | | | 銀 | 銀 | | | | | 4 |
| | | | | 歩 | 歩 | | | | 5 |
| | | 歩 | | | 銀 | 歩 | | | 6 |
| 歩 | 歩 | | 歩 | 歩 | | | 歩 | 歩 | 7 |
| | 角 | | 銀 | | 飛 | | | | 8 |
| 香 | 桂 | | 金 | 玉 | 金 | | 桂 | 香 | 9 |

☗ pieces in hand: –
10... K-52

☖ pieces in hand: 銀

| 9 | 8 | 7 | 6 | 5 | 4 | 3 | 2 | 1 |
| 香 | 桂 | | | | | | 桂 | 香 | 1 |
| | | 金 | | 王 | | 金 | | | 2 |
| 歩 | 歩 | 歩 | 歩 | | 歩 | 歩 | 歩 | 歩 | 3 |
| | | | 銀 | | | | | | 4 |
| | | | | 歩 | 歩 | | | | 5 |
| | | 歩 | 銀 | | 銀 | 歩 | | | 6 |
| 歩 | 歩 | | 歩 | 歩 | | | 歩 | 歩 | 7 |
| | 角 | | | 金 | 飛 | | | | 8 |
| 香 | 桂 | | 金 | 玉 | | | 桂 | 香 | 9 |

☗ pieces in hand: –
13... Sx66

==== ☖10...G-52 ====
☖ pieces in hand: –

| 9 | 8 | 7 | 6 | 5 | 4 | 3 | 2 | 1 |
| 香 | 桂 | | | 王 | | | 桂 | 香 | 1 |
| | | | | 金 | | 金 | | | 2 |
| 歩 | 歩 | 歩 | 歩 | | 歩 | 歩 | 歩 | 歩 | 3 |
| | | | 銀 | 銀 | | | | | 4 |
| | | | | 歩 | 歩 | | | | 5 |
| | | 歩 | | | 銀 | 歩 | | | 6 |
| 歩 | 歩 | | 歩 | 歩 | | | 歩 | 歩 | 7 |
| | 角 | | 銀 | | 飛 | | | | 8 |
| 香 | 桂 | | 金 | 玉 | 金 | | 桂 | 香 | 9 |

☗ pieces in hand: –
10... G-52

☖ pieces in hand: 歩

| 9 | 8 | 7 | 6 | 5 | 4 | 3 | 2 | 1 |
| 香 | 桂 | | | 王 | | | 桂 | 香 | 1 |
| | | | | 金 | | 金 | | | 2 |
| 歩 | | 歩 | 歩 | | 歩 | 歩 | 歩 | 歩 | 3 |
| | 歩 | | 銀 | | | | | | 4 |
| | | | | 歩 | 歩 | | | | 5 |
| | | 銀 | 銀 | | 銀 | 歩 | | | 6 |
| 歩 | 歩 | | 歩 | 歩 | | | 歩 | 歩 | 7 |
| | 角 | | | 金 | 飛 | | | | 8 |
| 香 | 桂 | | 金 | 玉 | | | 桂 | 香 | 9 |

☗ pieces in hand: –
13... Sx76

== See also ==
- 4-Piece handicap
- Handicap (shogi)
- Shogi opening

== Bibliography ==
- Hodges, George, ed. (1981). "Aono visits Netherlands". Shogi (32): 18. · Rook & Lance, 2-Piece, 4-Piece, and 6-Piece handicap games from 1981
- Hosking, Tony (1996). The art of shogi. The Shogi Foundation. ISBN 978-0-95310-890-9.
- 所司, 和晴 (2000). 駒落ち定跡. 毎日コミュニケーションズ. ISBN 4-8197-0209-2.
