= Yoshio =

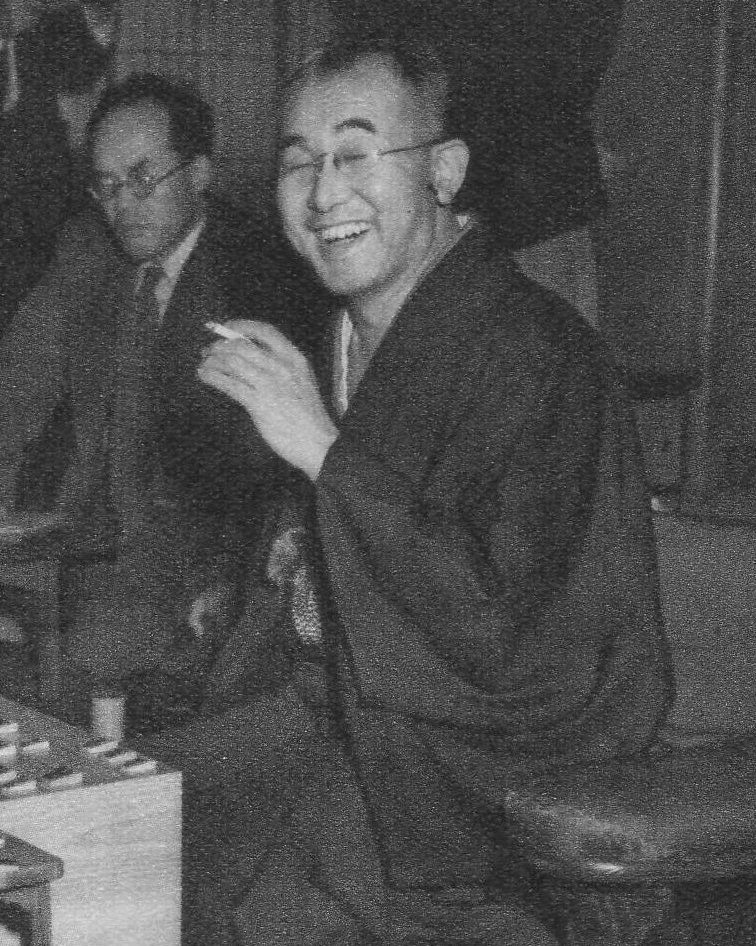
- Yoshio Kimura (1905–1986), Japanese shogi player
- Pronunciation: joɕio (IPA)
- Gender: Male

Origin
- Origin: Japanese
- Meaning: Different meanings depending on the kanji used

Other names
- Alternative spelling: Yosio (Kunrei-shiki) Yosio (Nihon-shiki) Yoshio (Hepburn)

Yoshio is both a masculine Japanese given name and a Japanese surname.

== Written forms ==
Yoshio can be written using many different combinations of kanji characters. Here are some examples:

- 義雄, "justice, masculine"
- 義男, "justice, man"
- 義夫, "justice, husband"
- 吉雄, "good luck, masculine"
- 吉男, "good luck, man"
- 吉夫, "good luck, husband"
- 善雄, "virtuous, masculine"
- 善男, "virtuous, man"
- 善夫, "virtuous, husband"
- 芳雄, "fragrant/virtuous, masculine"
- 芳男, "fragrant/virtuous, man"
- 芳夫, "fragrant/virtuous, husband"
- 喜雄, "rejoice, masculine"
- 喜男, "rejoice, noble"
- 喜夫, "rejoice, husband"
- 慶雄, "congratulate, masculine"
- 佳夫, "fine, husband"
- 嘉男, "excellent, man"
- 余四男, "too much, 4, man"
- 誉士夫, "reputation, knight, husband"

The name can also be written in hiragana よしお or katakana ヨシオ.

== Notable people with the name ==
- Yoshio Abe (阿部 余四男; 1891–1960), Japanese zoologist
- Yoshio Anabuki (穴吹 義雄, 1933–2018), Japanese former baseball player and former manager of the Nankai Hawks
- Yoshio Fujiwara, (藤原 良夫, Birth and death unknown) former Japanese football player
- Yoshio Fukuyama (福山 喜雄, 1921–1995), theologian who holds a doctorate in sociology from the University of Chicago
- Yoshio Furukawa (古川 好男, born 1934), former Japanese football player
- Yoshio Hachiro (鉢呂 吉雄, born 1948), Japanese politician of the Democratic Party of Japan (DPJ)
- Yoshio Harada (原田 芳雄, 1940–2011), Japanese actor
- Yoshio Hoshino (星野 好男; born 1950), Japanese ice hockey player
- Yoshio Iimuro (飯室 芳男; 1925–2023), Japanese triple jumper
- Yoshio Inaba (稲葉 義男, 1920–1998), Japanese actor who played Gorobei in Akira Kurosawa's Seven Samurai
- Yoshio Ishida (石田 芳夫, born 1948), professional Go player
- Yoshio Kato (加藤 好男, born 1957), former Japanese football player
- Yoshio Kawai (河合 義雄, born 1954), Japanese voice actor
- Yoshio Kikugawa (菊川 凱夫, born 1944), former Japanese football player
- Yoshio Kimura (木村 義雄, born 1948), Japanese politician of the Liberal Democratic Party
- Yoshio Kimura (shogi) (木村 義雄, 1905–1986), Japanese shogi player
- Yoshio Kitagawa (北川 佳男, born 1978), former Japanese football player
- Yoshio Kitajima (北島 義生, born 1975), Japanese football player
- Yoshio Kodaira (小平 義雄, 1905–1949), Japanese rapist and serial killer
- Yoshio Kodama (児玉 誉士夫, 1911–1984), prominent figure in the rise of organized crime in Japan
- Yoshio Koizumi (小泉 佳穂; born 1996), Japanese footballer
- Yoshio Kojima (小島 義雄, born 1980), Japanese comedian famous for appearing in only a small bathing suit
- Yoshio Kushida (串田 嘉男, born 1957), Japanese astronomer
- Yoshio Machida (町田 良夫, born 1967), experimental musician, a steelpanist, composer, and visual artist
- Yoshio Maki (牧 義夫, born 1958), Japanese politician of the Democratic Party of Japan
- Yoshio Makino (牧野 義雄, 1869–1956), Japanese artist and author who spent much of his life in London
- Yoshio Masui (増井 禎夫, born 1931), Japanese cell biologist
- Yoshio Mikami (三上 義夫, 1875–1950), Japanese mathematician and was an historian
- Yoshio Miki (三木 義雄, 1905–????), Japanese hurdler
- Yoshio Minato (湊 義雄; born 1949), Japanese rower
- Yoshio Mochizuki (望月 義夫, 1947–2019), Japanese politician of the Liberal Democratic Party
- Yoshio Morikawa (森川 嘉男; born 1945), Japanese racewalker
- Yoshio Nakagawa (中川 義雄, born 1938), Japanese politician of the Liberal Democratic Party
- Yoshio Nakamura (中村 佳央; born 1970), Japanese judoka
- Yoshio Nishi (西 義郎, 1934–2019), Japanese scholar of Tibeto-Burman linguistics
- Yoshio Nishina (仁科 芳雄, 1890–1951), the founding father of modern physics research in Japan
- Yoshio Nomura (野村 義男; born 1964), Japanese idol, musician and actor
- Yoshio Oishi (大石 良雄, 1659–1703), the chamberlain of the Akō han in Harima Province, Japan (1679–1701)
- Yoshio Okada (岡田 吉夫, 1926–2002), former Japanese football player
- Yoshio Sakai (酒井 義雄, 1910–?), Japanese field hockey player
- Yoshio Sakamoto (坂本 賀勇, born 1959), Japanese game designer working for Nintendo
- Yoshio Sakurauchi (櫻内 義雄, 1912–2003), Japanese politician
- Yoshio Sawai (澤井 啓夫, born 1977), Japanese gag manga creator
- Yoshio Shimura (志村 義夫; born 1940), Japanese cyclist
- Yoshio Shinozuka (篠塚 良雄, 1923–2014), former Imperial Army soldier who served with a top secret Japanese biological warfare group in World War II
- Yoshio Shirai (白井 義男, 1923–2003), professional boxer from Tokyo, Japan
- Yoshio Sugimoto (杉本 良夫; born 1939), Japanese sociologist
- Yoshio Tabata (田端 義夫, 1919–2013), Japanese ryūkōka and enka singer, songwriter and electric guitarist
- Yoshio Tachibana (立花 芳夫, 1890–1946), lieutenant general of the Japanese Imperial Army
- Yoshio Taniguchi (谷口 吉生, 1937–2024), Japanese architect who redesigned the Museum of Modern Art in New York
- Yoshio Tarui (樽井 芳雄, 1902–1977), Japanese photographer
- Yoshio Tezuka (手塚 仁雄, born 1966), Japanese politician
- Yoshio Tsuchiya (土屋 嘉男, 1927–2017), Japanese actor who has appeared in several films
- Yoshio Ueki (植木 善大, born 1969), professional Go player
- Yoshio Urushibara (漆原 良夫, born 1944), Japanese politician of the New Komeito Party
- Yoshio Utsumi (内海 善雄, born 1942), the secretary-general of the International Telecommunication Union 1998–2006
- Yoshio Watanabe (渡辺 義雄, 1907–2000), renowned Japanese photographer
- Yoshio Yamada (山田 孝雄||1873–1958), Japanese linguist
- Yoshio Yatsu (谷津 義男, 1934–2021), Japanese politician of the Liberal Democratic Party
- Yoshio Yoda (ヨシオ・ジェームス・ヨダ, 1934–2023), Japanese-American actor who played Fuji Kobiaji on the television series McHale's Navy
- Yoshio Yoshida (吉田 義男, 1933–2025), Japanese baseball player and manager
- Yoshio Yoshida (吉田 好雄, 1921 – before 2000), Japanese World War II flying ace

== Notable people with the surname Yoshio ==
- Kosaku Yoshio (吉雄 耕牛, 1724–1800), Japanese scholar of "Dutch studies", and the chief Dutch translator in Nagasaki
- Shoji Yoshio (吉尾 詔二; born 1943), Japanese sprint canoeist

== Fictional characters ==
Yoshio Saotome (早乙女 好雄), from Tokimeki Memorial

== Nicknames and other uses ==
Yoshio, artistic name of Mexican-Japanese singer born Gustavo Nakatani Ávila
