= Ueki (surname) =

Ueki (written: 植木 lit. "planted tree") is a Japanese surname. Notable people with the surname include:

- Ueki Emori (植木 枝盛, 1857–1892), Japanese politician and samurai
- Hitoshi Ueki (植木 等, 1926–2007), Japanese actor, singer, comedian and musician
- Masaaki Ueki (植木 政明, born 1939), Japanese karateka
- Noboru Ueki (植木 昇, 1905–1992), Japanese photographer
- Riko Ueki (植木 理子, born 1999), Japanese women's footballer
- Shigeharu Ueki (植木 繁晴, born 1954), Japanese footballer
- Takayuki Ueki (植木嵩行, born 1992), Japanese professional wrestler
- Yoshio Ueki (植木 善大, born 1969), Japanese Go player
