= Three Pawns handicap =

Three Pawns start position
☖ pieces in hand: 歩歩歩

9	8	7	6	5	4	3	2	1
				王					1
									2
									3
									4
									5
									6
歩	歩	歩	歩	歩	歩	歩	歩	歩	7
	角						飛		8
香	桂	銀	金	玉	金	銀	桂	香	9

☗ pieces in hand: –

The Three Pawns (歩三兵 fu sanbyō) handicap in shogi is used to teach novice players the vulnerability of bishops and the threat of dropped pawns.

White has only their king on the board with no other pieces (like the Naked King 裸玉 handicap) and three pawns held in hand. Black has the usual setup of twenty pieces.

== Opening ==
First Move
☖ pieces in hand: 歩歩

9	8	7	6	5	4	3	2	1
				王					1
									2
									3
									4
									5
	歩								6
歩	歩	歩	歩	歩	歩	歩	歩	歩	7
	角						飛		8
香	桂	銀	金	玉	金	銀	桂	香	9

☗ pieces in hand: –
1... P*86

1...P*86. As with all traditional handicap games, White has the first move. The standard first move is to drop a dangling pawn (垂れ歩) on the eighth file attacking the head of Black's bishop (角頭 kaku tō). White is threatening to promote this pawn to a tokin (と) on their next move.

The test here is to see if Black can respond adequately to this threat. There are three ways to respond to avoid the loss of the bishop.

=== Silver response ☗ 2. S-78 ===
Silver
☖ pieces in hand: 歩歩

9	8	7	6	5	4	3	2	1
				王					1
									2
									3
									4
									5
	歩								6
歩	歩	歩	歩	歩	歩	歩	歩	歩	7
	角	銀					飛		8
香	桂		金	玉	金	銀	桂	香	9

☗ pieces in hand: –
2. S-78

2. S-78. Moving the silver up to rank 8 defends the 87 square rendering White's pawn attack futile.

Promotion
☖ pieces in hand: 歩歩歩

9	8	7	6	5	4	3	2	1
				王					1
									2
									3
									4
									5
									6
歩	と	歩	歩	歩	歩	歩	歩	歩	7
	角	銀					飛		8
香	桂		金	玉	金	銀	桂	香	9

☗ pieces in hand: –
2... Px87+
Capture
☖ pieces in hand: 歩歩歩

9	8	7	6	5	4	3	2	1
				王					1
									2
									3
									4
									5
									6
歩	銀	歩	歩	歩	歩	歩	歩	歩	7
	角						飛		8
香	桂		金	玉	金	銀	桂	香	9

☗ pieces in hand: 歩
3. Sx87

2...Px87+, 3. Sx87. Although White can promote their pawn and capture Black's pawn (obtaining 3 pawns in hand again), Black can simply capture the promoted pawn.

Drop
☖ pieces in hand: 歩歩

9	8	7	6	5	4	3	2	1
				王					1
									2
									3
									4
									5
	歩								6
歩	銀	歩	歩	歩	歩	歩	歩	歩	7
	角						飛		8
香	桂		金	玉	金	銀	桂	香	9

☗ pieces in hand: 歩
3... P*86
Retreat
☖ pieces in hand: 歩歩

9	8	7	6	5	4	3	2	1
				王					1
									2
									3
									4
									5
	歩								6
歩		歩	歩	歩	歩	歩	歩	歩	7
	角	銀					飛		8
香	桂		金	玉	金	銀	桂	香	9

☗ pieces in hand: 歩
4. S-78

Furthermore, Black's advanced silver can always retreat back to the 78 square if White threatens with another pawn drop (3...P*86, 4. S-78).

Pawn Capture
☖ pieces in hand: 歩歩

9	8	7	6	5	4	3	2	1
				王					1
									2
									3
									4
									5
	銀								6
歩		歩	歩	歩	歩	歩	歩	歩	7
	角						飛		8
香	桂		金	玉	金	銀	桂	香	9

☗ pieces in hand: 歩歩
4. Sx86

Bishop Retreat
☖ pieces in hand: 歩

9	8	7	6	5	4	3	2	1
				王					1
									2
									3
									4
									5
	銀								6
歩	歩	歩	歩	歩	歩	歩	歩	歩	7
							飛		8
香	桂	角	金	玉	金	銀	桂	香	9

☗ pieces in hand: 歩歩
4... P*87
5. B-79

If White does drop another pawn and Black captures it (3...P*86, 4. Sx86), then Black's silver offers no protection for the bishop from White's subsequent pawn drop. However, now the 79 square is free for the bishop to retreat to. White's pawn on 87 is not a threat.

If Black plays from here on without major errors, they should become the victor. (Note: For instance, if the game started with 1...P*86 2. S-78 Px87 3. Sx87 P*86 4. Sx86 P*87 5. B-79, a reasonable development could have Black pushing their central pawn with 6. P-56 allowing the bishop to promote with 7. B-13+.)

=== Gold response ☗ 2. G-78 ===
Gold
☖ pieces in hand: 歩歩

9	8	7	6	5	4	3	2	1
				王					1
									2
									3
									4
									5
	歩								6
歩	歩	歩	歩	歩	歩	歩	歩	歩	7
	角	金					飛		8
香	桂	銀		玉	金	銀	桂	香	9

☗ pieces in hand: –
2. G-78

Pawn Capture
☖ pieces in hand: 歩歩歩

9	8	7	6	5	4	3	2	1
				王					1
									2
									3
									4
									5
									6
歩	金	歩	歩	歩	歩	歩	歩	歩	7
	角						飛		8
香	桂	銀		玉	金	銀	桂	香	9

☗ pieces in hand: 歩
2... Px87+
3. Gx87

2. G-78. Moving the gold to defend the bishop's head is a standard move in many Double Static Rook openings, such as Bishop Exchange, Double Wing Attack, or Side Pawn Capture. (Note: Defending the bishop's head in (even game) Double Static Rook openings with a silver is generally considered a poor move as a silver on 78 does not defend the bishop's 88 square. However, the silver is suitable for the Three Pawns handicap since White has no rook on the eighth file supporting their pawn drop tactics.) In the Three Pawns handicap, using the gold is slightly more complicated than using the silver (shown above).

2...Px87+, 3. Gx87. White's pawn promotes, and Black's gold recaptures.

Dangling Pawn
☖ pieces in hand: 歩歩

9	8	7	6	5	4	3	2	1
				王					1
									2
									3
									4
									5
	歩								6
歩	金	歩	歩	歩	歩	歩	歩	歩	7
	角						飛		8
香	桂	銀		玉	金	銀	桂	香	9

☗ pieces in hand: 歩
3... P*86
Pawn Capture
☖ pieces in hand: 歩歩

9	8	7	6	5	4	3	2	1
				王					1
									2
									3
									4
									5
	金								6
歩		歩	歩	歩	歩	歩	歩	歩	7
	角						飛		8
香	桂	銀		玉	金	銀	桂	香	9

☗ pieces in hand: 歩歩
4. Gx86

3...P*86. White can then strike with another dangling pawn.

4. Gx86. Unlike the case with the silver defense, a gold cannot retreat and must move forward and capture the pawn.

Striking Pawn
☖ pieces in hand: 歩

9	8	7	6	5	4	3	2	1
				王					1
									2
									3
									4
	歩								5
	金								6
歩		歩	歩	歩	歩	歩	歩	歩	7
	角						飛		8
香	桂	銀		玉	金	銀	桂	香	9

☗ pieces in hand: 歩歩
4... P*85
Gold Retreat
☖ pieces in hand: 歩

9	8	7	6	5	4	3	2	1
				王					1
									2
									3
									4
	歩								5
									6
歩	金	歩	歩	歩	歩	歩	歩	歩	7
	角						飛		8
香	桂	銀		玉	金	銀	桂	香	9

☗ pieces in hand: 歩歩
5. G-86

4...P*85. White will try another a drop with a striking pawn (叩きの歩). The hope is White can lure Black's gold forward.

5. G-86. The correct response to the striking pawn is for the gold to retreat. After this, White's attack on the eighth file is exhausted.

Blunder
☖ pieces in hand: –

9	8	7	6	5	4	3	2	1
				王					1
									2
									3
									4
	金								5
									6
歩	歩	歩	歩	歩	歩	歩	歩	歩	7
	角						飛		8
香	桂	銀		玉	金	銀	桂	香	9

☗ pieces in hand: 歩歩
5. Gx85? P*87!

If instead Black captures the striking pawn (5. Gx85?), the gold will be positioned on the 85 square and no longer able to defend the bishop's head, the 87 square, where White can drop their last pawn (5...P*87!) and capture Black's bishop on their next move (6...Px88+!).

Similar comments apply to the gold moving sideways to either the left (5. G-96?) or right (5. G-76?).

=== Bishop diagonal ☗ 2. P-76 ===
Bishop Diagonal
☖ pieces in hand: 歩歩

9	8	7	6	5	4	3	2	1
				王					1
									2
									3
									4
									5
	歩	歩							6
歩	歩		歩	歩	歩	歩	歩	歩	7
	角						飛		8
香	桂	銀	金	玉	金	銀	桂	香	9

☗ pieces in hand: –
2. P-76

Promotion
☖ pieces in hand: 歩歩歩

9	8	7	6	5	4	3	2	1
				王					1
									2
						馬			3
									4
									5
		歩							6
歩	と		歩	歩	歩	歩	歩	歩	7
							飛		8
香	桂	銀	金	玉	金	銀	桂	香	9

☗ pieces in hand: –
2... Px87+
3. B-33+

2. P-76. Another possible but suboptimal move is to create an escape hatch for Black's bishop.

2...Px87+, 3. B-33+. Although White can promote their pawn, Black's bishop can escape to 33 and promote as well checking White's king.

After White resolves Black's check, White has a further chance to exchange pawns for more powerful pieces. For example, White can sacrifice a pawn (4...P*98, 5. Lx98) and then drop another pawn (5...P*88) in order to attack both Black's lance and knight allowing White to trade a pawn for a lance and possibly the other pawn for another piece.

Thus, although Black has saved one their most powerful pieces, opening up the bishop diagonal gives White more of an advantage compared with protecting the bishop's head with a silver or gold. Furthermore, the bishop's diagonal can always be opened after proper defense of the bishop's head.

=== Blunder ☗ 2. Px86 ===
Blunder
☖ pieces in hand: 歩歩

9	8	7	6	5	4	3	2	1
				王					1
									2
									3
									4
									5
	歩								6
歩		歩	歩	歩	歩	歩	歩	歩	7
	角						飛		8
香	桂	銀	金	玉	金	銀	桂	香	9

☗ pieces in hand: 歩
2. Px86?
Pawn Drop (bishop is dead)
☖ pieces in hand: 歩

9	8	7	6	5	4	3	2	1
				王					1
									2
									3
									4
									5
	歩								6
歩	歩	歩	歩	歩	歩	歩	歩	歩	7
	角						飛		8
香	桂	銀	金	玉	金	銀	桂	香	9

☗ pieces in hand: –
2... P*87!

2. Px86? Black reflexively capturing White's pawn on 86 is a blunder. Although this captures White's pawn, it does not remove the threat to Black's bishop as the bishop's head is still vulnerable.

2...P*87! White can now drop a pawn directly on the bishop's head. At this point, Black has no way to prevent White from capturing their bishop and dramatically improving White's chances.

Bishop Drop
☖ pieces in hand: 歩歩

9	8	7	6	5	4	3	2	1
				王					1
									2
									3
									4
			角						5
	歩						歩		6
歩		歩	歩	歩	歩	歩		歩	7
	銀						飛		8
香	桂		金	玉	金	銀	桂	香	9

☗ pieces in hand: 歩
3. P-26 Px88
4. Sx88 B*65!
Lance Dead
☖ pieces in hand: 歩

9	8	7	6	5	4	3	2	1
				王					1
									2
									3
									4
			角						5
	歩						歩		6
歩		歩	歩	歩	歩	歩		歩	7
歩	銀				銀		飛		8
香	桂		金	玉	金		桂	香	9

☗ pieces in hand: 歩
5. S-48 P*98!

This pawn drop on the bishop's head is a tactic that can be applied to real even game openings such as the Double Wing Attack opening if either Black or White does not appropriately defend their bishops' heads.

== See also ==
- Handicap (shogi)
- Shogi opening
