= 6-Piece handicap =

6-Piece Handicap
☖ pieces in hand: –

9	8	7	6	5	4	3	2	1
		銀	金	王	金	銀			1
									2
歩	歩	歩	歩	歩	歩	歩	歩	歩	3
									4
									5
									6
歩	歩	歩	歩	歩	歩	歩	歩	歩	7
	角						飛		8
香	桂	銀	金	玉	金	銀	桂	香	9

☗ pieces in hand: –

The 6-Piece (六枚落ち rokumai-ochi) handicap in shogi has both of White's major pieces, the rook and the bishop, removed as well as their lances and knights. Thus, White is left with pawns, golds, and silvers.

Black has the usual setup of twenty pieces.

The handicap is a part of the official handicap system.

== Openings ==
=== Ninth File Edge Attack ===
9筋攻め

== See also ==
- Handicap (shogi)
- 8-Piece handicap
- Shogi opening

== Bibliography ==
- Fairbairn, John (1979). "Handicap series No. 5: Six piece handicap". Shogi (22): 6–7.
- Hodges, George, ed. (1978). "6-piece handicap shogi". Shogi (11). Translated by Hideo, Motoyoshi: 2, 18. · translated from Shōgi Taikan by Yoshio Kimura
- Hodges, George, ed. (1981). "Aono visits Netherlands". Shogi (32): 18. · Rook & Lance, 2-Piece, 4-Piece, and 6-Piece handicap games from 1981
- Hosking, Tony (1996). The art of shogi. The Shogi Foundation. ISBN 978-0-95310-890-9.
- 板谷, 進 [Susumu Itaya] (1988). 駒落ちハンドブック. 毎日コミュニケーションズ.
- 影山, 稔雄 [Toshio Kageyama]; 木村, 義雄 [Yoshio Kimura] (1955). 将棋駒落の指し方. 大泉書店.
- Kaufman, Larry (1983). "New ideas in handicap openings". Shogi (42): 13–15.
- Kitao, Madoka (2012). Edge attack at a glance. Translated by Kawasaki, Tomohide. Nekomado. ISBN 978-4-9052-2502-7.
- 所司, 和晴 [Kazuharu Shoshi] (2000). 駒落ち定跡. 毎日コミュニケーションズ. ISBN 4-8197-0209-2.
