= 10-Piece handicap =

Standard handicap in shogi

10-Piece
☖ pieces in hand: –

9	8	7	6	5	4	3	2	1
				王					1
									2
歩	歩	歩	歩	歩	歩	歩	歩	歩	3
									4
									5
									6
歩	歩	歩	歩	歩	歩	歩	歩	歩	7
	角						飛		8
香	桂	銀	金	玉	金	銀	桂	香	9

☗ pieces in hand: –

The 10-Piece (十枚落ち jūmai-ochi) handicap in shogi has all of White's pieces removed except for the king and their line of pawns. (Thus, their rook, bishop, golds, silvers, knights, and lances are all missing.)

This handicap is very severe and, thus, not competitive. It is not deemed an official handicap of the Japan Shogi Association. Its purpose is primarily for teaching shogi novices how to play.

In this handicap, a major pedagogical point is how to activate Black's bishop and then promote it. Finally, as with all large handicaps, Black should try to achieve a mating position in the fewest moves possible as well as preventing White from creating an Entering King situation in which it may be impossible to mate White.

== Opening ==
Protecting 33
☖ pieces in hand: –

9	8	7	6	5	4	3	2	1
									1
					王				2
歩	歩	歩	歩	歩	歩	歩	歩	歩	3
									4
									5
									6
歩	歩	歩	歩	歩	歩	歩	歩	歩	7
	角						飛		8
香	桂	銀	金	玉	金	銀	桂	香	9

☗ pieces in hand: –
1...K-42
Bishop Diagonal
☖ pieces in hand: –

9	8	7	6	5	4	3	2	1
									1
					王				2
歩	歩	歩	歩	歩	歩	歩	歩	歩	3
									4
									5
		歩							6
歩	歩		歩	歩	歩	歩	歩	歩	7
	角						飛		8
香	桂	銀	金	玉	金	銀	桂	香	9

☗ pieces in hand: –
2.P-76

1...K-42. The most reasonable move for White is to protect their pawns on the 53, 43, and 33 squares.

Once Black opens their bishop diagonal, the 33 square is in the direct line of fire of Black's bishop.

If White made a first move of 1...K-62, after 2.P-76, White's king does not have to time to move to the 42 square in order to protect 33 and White would promote their bishop with 3.Bx33+. (Note: That is, after 1...K-62, the game would proceed with 2.P-76 K-52 3.Bx33+! ☖ pieces in hand: –: 9 / 8 / 7 / 6 / 5 / 4 / 3 / 2 / 1; / / / / / / / / / 1; / / / 王 / / / / / / 2; 歩 / 歩 / 歩 / 歩 / 歩 / 歩 / 歩 / 歩 / 歩 / 3; / / / / / / / / / 4; / / / / / / / / / 5; / / 歩 / / / / / / / 6; 歩 / 歩 / / 歩 / 歩 / 歩 / 歩 / 歩 / 歩 / 7; / 角 / / / / / / 飛 / / 8; 香 / 桂 / 銀 / 金 / 玉 / 金 / 銀 / 桂 / 香 / 9; ☗ pieces in hand: – ☖ pieces in hand: –: 9 / 8 / 7 / 6 / 5 / 4 / 3 / 2 / 1; / / / / / / / / / 1; / / / / 王 / / / / / 2; 歩 / 歩 / 歩 / 歩 / 歩 / 歩 / 馬 / 歩 / 歩 / 3; / / / / / / / / / 4; / / / / / / / / / 5; / / 歩 / / / / / / / 6; 歩 / 歩 / / 歩 / 歩 / 歩 / 歩 / 歩 / 歩 / 7; / 角 / / / / / / 飛 / / 8; 香 / 桂 / 銀 / 金 / 玉 / 金 / 銀 / 桂 / 香 / 9; ☗ pieces in hand: –)

2.P-76. Part of the main pedagogical point of this handicap: activate the bishop by opening its diagonal with a pawn push on the seventh file.

This move prepares an exit hatch for the bishop so that it might move outside of Black's camp and attack one of White's undefended pawns and simultaneously promote.

Although it may be possible to activate the rook instead with a pawn push on the second file (with 2.P-26 aiming for 3.P-25 and 4.P-24), this is slower than activating the bishop since the bishop can immediately become mobile outside of Black's camp after 2.P-76. Note that even in even games, activating the bishop with P-76 is the most frequent first move by either Black or White.

Controlling 55
☖ pieces in hand: –

9	8	7	6	5	4	3	2	1
									1
					王				2
歩	歩	歩	歩		歩	歩	歩	歩	3
				歩					4
									5
		歩							6
歩	歩		歩	歩	歩	歩	歩	歩	7
	角						飛		8
香	桂	銀	金	玉	金	銀	桂	香	9

☗ pieces in hand: –
2...P-54
Bishop Development
☖ pieces in hand: –

9	8	7	6	5	4	3	2	1
									1
					王				2
歩	歩	歩	歩		歩	歩	歩	歩	3
				歩					4
									5
		歩	角						6
歩	歩		歩	歩	歩	歩	歩	歩	7
							飛		8
香	桂	銀	金	玉	金	銀	桂	香	9

☗ pieces in hand: –
3.B-66

2...P-54. Although other moves may be possible, pushing the central file pawn has multiple purposes.

The most apparent reason is to prevent Black's bishop from moving to the 55 square. If White allowed this by, for instance, moving the king further to the side with 2...K32, after Black moves their bishop 3.B-55, Black would be able to promote their bishop on the seventh file on their next move with 4.Bx73+. (Note: For instance, after 1...K-42 2.P-76 K-32, then 3.B-55 P-54 4.Bx73+. ☖ pieces in hand: –: 9 / 8 / 7 / 6 / 5 / 4 / 3 / 2 / 1; / / / / / / / / / 1; / / / / / / 王 / / / 2; 歩 / 歩 / 歩 / 歩 / 歩 / 歩 / 歩 / 歩 / 歩 / 3; / / / / / / / / / 4; / / / / 角 / / / / / 5; / / 歩 / / / / / / / 6; 歩 / 歩 / / 歩 / 歩 / 歩 / 歩 / 歩 / 歩 / 7; / / / / / / / 飛 / / 8; 香 / 桂 / 銀 / 金 / 玉 / 金 / 銀 / 桂 / 香 / 9; ☗ pieces in hand: – ☖ pieces in hand: –: 9 / 8 / 7 / 6 / 5 / 4 / 3 / 2 / 1; / / / / / / / / / 1; / / / / / / 王 / / / 2; 歩 / 歩 / 馬 / 歩 / / 歩 / 歩 / 歩 / 歩 / 3; / / / / 歩 / / / / / 4; / / / / / / / / / 5; / / 歩 / / / / / / / 6; 歩 / 歩 / / 歩 / 歩 / 歩 / 歩 / 歩 / 歩 / 7; / / / / / / / 飛 / / 8; 香 / 桂 / 銀 / 金 / 玉 / 金 / 銀 / 桂 / 香 / 9; ☗ pieces in hand: 歩) Although White cannot prevent Black's bishop from promoting with only a single king defending their line of pawns, it is preferable that Black's bishop promote on a file that is further away from White's king such as the ninth file.

A second reason for the central pawn development is to give White's king the possibility of advancing up to the 53 square. In very large handicaps like this 10-Piece Handicap, White must use their king very actively typically advancing their king upward behind previously advanced pawns.

3.B-66. Moving the bishop to the 66 square aims Black's bishop on the 93 square where it can promote. This is the second teaching point of this handicap.

Although White has thwarted Black's attempts to promote their bishop on the 33 and 73 squares with 1...K-42 and 2...P-54, there is no way for White to prevent a promotion on the ninth file with the king so far away and there being no lance on 91 protecting the ninth file as is the case in even games. (Note: Incidentally, in the next stage handicap – the 9-Piece Handicap – a right gold is added to White's defense, which is used to defend this ninth file forcing Black to change their attack strategy.) Even if White tries to prevent Black from capturing the ninth file pawn by pushing the pawn with 3...P-94, it is of little consequence since the promotion of the bishop is the important issue. After the bishop promotion, Black will be in a good position. (Note: Kageyama & Kimura's (1955) discussion of this handicap ends here. In what follows is Ishibashi's (2012) suggested line of attack for Black and responses by White.)

=== Ishibashi example ===
Bishop Promotion
☖ pieces in hand: –

9	8	7	6	5	4	3	2	1
									1
					王				2
馬	歩	歩			歩	歩	歩	歩	3
			歩	歩					4
									5
		歩							6
歩	歩		歩	歩	歩	歩	歩	歩	7
							飛		8
香	桂	銀	金	玉	金	銀	桂	香	9

☗ pieces in hand: 歩
3...P-64 4.Bx93+
Rook Activation
☖ pieces in hand: –

9	8	7	6	5	4	3	2	1
									1
									2
馬	歩	歩		王	歩	歩	歩	歩	3
			歩	歩					4
									5
		歩					歩		6
歩	歩		歩	歩	歩	歩		歩	7
							飛		8
香	桂	銀	金	玉	金	銀	桂	香	9

☗ pieces in hand: 歩
4...K-53 5.P-26

3...P-64. This pawn push gives White the option of moving their king to the 63 square as well as continuing to push the sixth file pawn further to 65. Making this sixth file pawn push, of course, gives up White's ninth file pawn. However, in such an extreme handicap as this, White will play aggressively and ignore the small material loss.

4.Bx93+. Black captures White's pawn on 93 and promotes.

4...K-53. White moves their king to the center.

5.P-26. Seeing White's move, Black opts to activate their rook with a pawn push since White's second file pawn is now undefended. For Ishibashi (2012: 35), this rook activation is the third pedagogical point of this handicap.

At this point, White can still move their king to defend the second file via 5...K-42 then 6...K-32. Even so, Black can still trade off their rook pawns with 6.P-25 7.P-24 Px24 8.Rx24. And, after a defending pawn drop 8...P*23 by White, Black's rook could capture White's central pawn with 9.Rx54 looking to promote the rook on the central file.

Rook Activation
☖ pieces in hand: –

9	8	7	6	5	4	3	2	1
									1
									2
馬	歩	歩		王	歩	歩	歩	歩	3
			歩						4
				歩			歩		5
		歩							6
歩	歩		歩	歩	歩	歩		歩	7
							飛		8
香	桂	銀	金	玉	金	銀	桂	香	9

☗ pieces in hand: 歩
5...P-55 6.P-25
Advanced King
☖ pieces in hand: –

9	8	7	6	5	4	3	2	1
									1
									2
馬	歩	歩			歩	歩	歩	歩	3
			歩	王					4
				歩			歩		5
		歩							6
歩	歩		歩	歩	歩	歩		歩	7
							飛		8
香	桂	銀	金	玉	金	銀	桂	香	9

☗ pieces in hand: 歩
6...K-54

5...P-55. White continues pushing their central pawn forward making way for the king to advance further toward Black's camp. Ultimately, White aims to attack on the central file as Black's king remains in its original start position on that file.

6.P-25. Another forward match of the rook pawn to be followed by another push to the 24 square.

Black aims to trade off this second file pawn so that the rook will have an unobstructed path to promote inside of White's camp. Since White has no pieces to defend on the second file, the rook promotion is inevitable.

6...K-54. King advances.

Pawn Trade Off
☖ pieces in hand: –

9	8	7	6	5	4	3	2	1
									1
									2
馬	歩	歩			歩	歩	歩	歩	3
			歩	王			歩		4
				歩					5
		歩							6
歩	歩		歩	歩	歩	歩		歩	7
							飛		8
香	桂	銀	金	玉	金	銀	桂	香	9

☗ pieces in hand: 歩
7.P-24
Pawn Trade Off
☖ pieces in hand: 歩

9	8	7	6	5	4	3	2	1
									1
									2
馬	歩	歩			歩	歩		歩	3
			歩	王			飛		4
				歩					5
		歩							6
歩	歩		歩	歩	歩	歩		歩	7
									8
香	桂	銀	金	玉	金	銀	桂	香	9

☗ pieces in hand: 歩歩
7...Px24 8.Rx24

7.P-24. This pawn push is the beginning of the second file pawn exchange: Black's pawn attacks, White's pawn captures, and Black's rook recaptures.

7...Px24. White will capture Black's pawn now as otherwise Black will capture White's pawn and additionally promote their pawn themselves with 8.Px23+. Giving Black a pawn for free and allowing their pawn on the board to promote is too beneficial for Black.

8.Rx24. Rook recaptures. Now both players have a pawn in hand. The rook recapture also puts White's king on the 54 square in check.

Rook Promotion
☖ pieces in hand: 歩

9	8	7	6	5	4	3	2	1
									1
							龍		2
馬	歩	歩				歩		歩	3
			歩	王	歩				4
				歩					5
		歩							6
歩	歩		歩	歩	歩	歩		歩	7
									8
香	桂	銀	金	玉	金	銀	桂	香	9

☗ pieces in hand: 歩歩
8...P-44 9.R-22+
Vanguard King
☖ pieces in hand: 歩

9	8	7	6	5	4	3	2	1
									1
							龍		2
馬	歩	歩				歩		歩	3
			歩		歩				4
				歩	王				5
		歩							6
歩	歩		歩	歩	歩	歩		歩	7
									8
香	桂	銀	金	玉	金	銀	桂	香	9

☗ pieces in hand: 歩歩
9...K-45

8...P-44. White pushes their fourth file pawn in order to resolve Black's check by the rook.

9.R-22+. With its path cleared, Black's rook promotes. Promoting on rank 2 (as opposed to rank 1, for instance) also confines White's king to ranks 3 and below since the promoted rook is attacking along the entire rank 2.

9...K-45. White's king moves forward again to the fourth file. The aim here is to attack on the central file and the king positioned on 45 allows the king to recapture a pawn on the 56 square.

White's Attack
☖ pieces in hand: 歩

9	8	7	6	5	4	3	2	1
									1
									2
馬	歩	歩				龍		歩	3
			歩		歩				4
					王				5
		歩		歩					6
歩	歩		歩	歩	歩	歩		歩	7
									8
香	桂	銀	金	玉	金	銀	桂	香	9

☗ pieces in hand: 歩歩
10.+Rx33 P-56
Horse Encroaches on King
☖ pieces in hand: 歩

9	8	7	6	5	4	3	2	1
									1
									2
	馬	歩				龍		歩	3
			歩		歩				4
					王				5
		歩		歩					6
歩	歩		歩	歩	歩	歩		歩	7
									8
香	桂	銀	金	玉	金	銀	桂	香	9

☗ pieces in hand: 歩歩歩
11.+Bx83

11.+Bx83. Black captures White's eighth file pawn. But, more importantly, this move puts White in threatmate.

White's Attack
☖ pieces in hand: 歩歩

9	8	7	6	5	4	3	2	1
									1
									2
	馬	歩				龍		歩	3
			歩		歩				4
					王				5
		歩							6
歩	歩		歩	と	歩	歩		歩	7
									8
香	桂	銀	金	玉	金	銀	桂	香	9

☗ pieces in hand: 歩歩歩
11...Px57+
Check
☖ pieces in hand: 歩歩

9	8	7	6	5	4	3	2	1
									1
		馬							2
		歩				龍		歩	3
			歩		歩				4
					王				5
		歩							6
歩	歩		歩	と	歩	歩		歩	7
									8
香	桂	銀	金	玉	金	銀	桂	香	9

☗ pieces in hand: 歩歩歩
12.+B-72

==== ☖12...K-55 ====
Check Resolution
☖ pieces in hand: 歩歩

9	8	7	6	5	4	3	2	1
									1
		馬							2
		歩				龍		歩	3
			歩		歩				4
				王					5
		歩							6
歩	歩		歩	と	歩	歩		歩	7
									8
香	桂	銀	金	玉	金	銀	桂	香	9

☗ pieces in hand: 歩歩歩
12...K-55
Tsume Sequence
☖ pieces in hand: 歩歩

9	8	7	6	5	4	3	2	1
									1
		馬							2
		歩						歩	3
			歩		歩				4
				王		龍			5
		歩							6
歩	歩		歩	と	歩	歩		歩	7
									8
香	桂	銀	金	玉	金	銀	桂	香	9

☗ pieces in hand: 歩歩歩
13.+R-35

12...K*55. White resolves Black's check (12.+B-72) by having the king flee from the bishop's attacking diagonal. (Another possibility is to interpose a pawn. See §12...P*54 below).

Tsume Sequence
☖ pieces in hand: 歩歩

9	8	7	6	5	4	3	2	1
									1
		馬							2
		歩						歩	3
			歩		歩				4
									5
		歩		王	龍				6
歩	歩		歩	と	歩	歩		歩	7
									8
香	桂	銀	金	玉	金	銀	桂	香	9

☗ pieces in hand: 歩歩歩
13...K-56 14.+R-46
Tsume Sequence
☖ pieces in hand: 歩歩

9	8	7	6	5	4	3	2	1
									1
		馬							2
		歩						歩	3
			歩		歩				4
			王						5
		歩			龍				6
歩	歩		歩	と	歩	歩		歩	7
									8
香	桂	銀	金	玉	金	銀	桂	香	9

☗ pieces in hand: 歩歩歩
14...K-65

Tsume Sequence
☖ pieces in hand: 歩歩

9	8	7	6	5	4	3	2	1
									1
		馬							2
		歩						歩	3
			歩		歩				4
			王						5
		歩	龍						6
歩	歩		歩	と	歩	歩		歩	7
									8
香	桂	銀	金	玉	金	銀	桂	香	9

☗ pieces in hand: 歩歩歩
15.+R-66
Tsume Sequence
☖ pieces in hand: 歩歩

9	8	7	6	5	4	3	2	1
									1
		馬							2
		歩						歩	3
		王	歩		歩				4
									5
		歩	龍						6
歩	歩		歩	と	歩	歩		歩	7
									8
香	桂	銀	金	玉	金	銀	桂	香	9

☗ pieces in hand: 歩歩歩
15...K-74

Checkmate
☖ pieces in hand: 歩歩

9	8	7	6	5	4	3	2	1
									1
		馬							2
		歩						歩	3
		王	歩		歩				4
		龍							5
		歩							6
歩	歩		歩	と	歩	歩		歩	7
									8
香	桂	銀	金	玉	金	銀	桂	香	9

☗ pieces in hand: 歩歩歩
16.+R-75

==== ☖12...P*54 ====
Check Resolution
☖ pieces in hand: 歩

9	8	7	6	5	4	3	2	1
									1
		馬							2
		歩				龍		歩	3
			歩	歩	歩				4
					王				5
		歩							6
歩	歩		歩	と	歩	歩		歩	7
									8
香	桂	銀	金	玉	金	銀	桂	香	9

☗ pieces in hand: 歩歩歩
12....P*54
Tsume Sequence
☖ pieces in hand: 歩

9	8	7	6	5	4	3	2	1
									1
		馬							2
		歩						歩	3
			歩	歩	歩				4
				王					5
		歩				龍			6
歩	歩		歩	と	歩	歩		歩	7
									8
香	桂	銀	金	玉	金	銀	桂	香	9

☗ pieces in hand: 歩歩歩
13.+R-36 K-55

12...P*54. Another way White could resolve Black's check (12.+B-72) is the drop an interposing pawn to the 54 square between the king and the bishop (instead of running with 12...K-55).

Tsume Sequence
☖ pieces in hand: 歩

9	8	7	6	5	4	3	2	1
									1
		馬							2
		歩						歩	3
			歩	歩	歩				4
				王					5
		歩			龍				6
歩	歩		歩	と	歩	歩		歩	7
									8
香	桂	銀	金	玉	金	銀	桂	香	9

☗ pieces in hand: 歩歩歩
14.+R-46
Tsume Sequence
☖ pieces in hand: 歩

9	8	7	6	5	4	3	2	1
									1
		馬							2
		歩						歩	3
			歩	歩	歩				4
			王						5
		歩	龍						6
歩	歩		歩	と	歩	歩		歩	7
									8
香	桂	銀	金	玉	金	銀	桂	香	9

☗ pieces in hand: 歩歩歩
14...K-65 15.+R-66

Tsume Sequence
☖ pieces in hand: 歩

9	8	7	6	5	4	3	2	1
									1
		馬							2
		歩						歩	3
		王	歩	歩	歩				4
									5
		歩	龍						6
歩	歩		歩	と	歩	歩		歩	7
									8
香	桂	銀	金	玉	金	銀	桂	香	9

☗ pieces in hand: 歩歩歩
15...K-74

== See also ==
- Handicap (shogi)
- 9-Piece handicap
