= 9-Piece handicap =

9-Piece
☖ pieces in hand: –

9	8	7	6	5	4	3	2	1
			金	王					1
									2
歩	歩	歩	歩	歩	歩	歩	歩	歩	3
									4
									5
									6
歩	歩	歩	歩	歩	歩	歩	歩	歩	7
	角						飛		8
香	桂	銀	金	玉	金	銀	桂	香	9

☗ pieces in hand: –

The 9-Piece (九枚落ち kyūmai-ochi) handicap in shogi has all of White's pieces removed except for the king, their right gold, and their line of pawns. (Thus, their rook, bishop, silvers, knights, lances, and the left gold are all missing.)

This handicap is very severe and, thus, not very competitive. It is not deemed an official handicap of the Japan Shogi Association. Its main goal is to instruct shogi beginners on how to play.

== Opening ==
9-Piece
☖ pieces in hand: –

9	8	7	6	5	4	3	2	1
			金						1
					王				2
歩	歩	歩	歩	歩	歩	歩	歩	歩	3
									4
									5
		歩							6
歩	歩		歩	歩	歩	歩	歩	歩	7
	角						飛		8
香	桂	銀	金	玉	金	銀	桂	香	9

☗ pieces in hand: –
1... K-42
2. P-76
9-Piece
☖ pieces in hand: –

9	8	7	6	5	4	3	2	1
									1
		金			王				2
歩	歩	歩	歩	歩	歩	歩	歩	歩	3
									4
									5
		歩							6
歩	歩		歩	歩	歩	歩	歩	歩	7
	角						飛		8
香	桂	銀	金	玉	金	銀	桂	香	9

☗ pieces in hand: –
2...G-72

1...K-42, 2. P-76. The same first moves as the lower handicap. (See: 10-Piece handicap.)

2...G-72. White moves their gold upward and leftward in order to protect the seventh file pawn (on 73) and as well as preparing to move again to further protect the ninth file pawn from an early breech by Black's bishop.

If White were to make the same 2...P-54 move as in the 10-Piece handicap opening, then Black would be able to promote their bishop on the 93 square.

9-Piece
☖ pieces in hand: –

9	8	7	6	5	4	3	2	1
									1
	金				王				2
歩	歩	歩	歩	歩	歩	歩	歩	歩	3
									4
									5
		歩	角						6
歩	歩		歩	歩	歩	歩	歩	歩	7
							飛		8
香	桂	銀	金	玉	金	銀	桂	香	9

☗ pieces in hand: –
3. B-66 G-82

=== ☗4. P-56 ===
9-Piece
☖ pieces in hand: –

9	8	7	6	5	4	3	2	1
									1
	金				王				2
歩	歩	歩	歩	歩	歩	歩	歩	歩	3
									4
									5
		歩	角	歩					6
歩	歩		歩		歩	歩	歩	歩	7
							飛		8
香	桂	銀	金	玉	金	銀	桂	香	9

☗ pieces in hand: –
4. P-56

9-Piece
☖ pieces in hand: –

9	8	7	6	5	4	3	2	1
									1
	金					王			2
歩	歩	歩	歩	歩	歩	歩	歩	歩	3
									4
									5
		歩		歩					6
歩	歩		歩	角	歩	歩	歩	歩	7
							飛		8
香	桂	銀	金	玉	金	銀	桂	香	9

☗ pieces in hand: –
4...K-32
5. B-57

This is the line suggested by Kageyama & Kimura (1955).

9-Piece
☖ pieces in hand: –

9	8	7	6	5	4	3	2	1
									1
	金						王		2
歩	歩	歩	歩	歩	歩	歩	歩	歩	3
									4
						角			5
		歩		歩					6
歩	歩		歩		歩	歩	歩	歩	7
							飛		8
香	桂	銀	金	玉	金	銀	桂	香	9

☗ pieces in hand: –
5...K-22
6. B-35

=== ☗4. P-26 ===
9-Piece
☖ pieces in hand: –

9	8	7	6	5	4	3	2	1
									1
	金				王				2
歩	歩	歩	歩	歩	歩	歩	歩	歩	3
									4
									5
		歩	角				歩		6
歩	歩		歩	歩	歩	歩		歩	7
							飛		8
香	桂	銀	金	玉	金	銀	桂	香	9

☗ pieces in hand: –
4. P-26

9-Piece
☖ pieces in hand: –

9	8	7	6	5	4	3	2	1
									1
	金					王			2
歩	歩	歩	歩	歩	歩	歩	歩	歩	3
									4
							歩		5
		歩	角						6
歩	歩		歩	歩	歩	歩		歩	7
							飛		8
香	桂	銀	金	玉	金	銀	桂	香	9

☗ pieces in hand: –
4...K-32
5. P-25

This is the line suggested by Ishibashi (2012).

== 9-Piece Right Gold ==
9-Piece Right Gold
☖ pieces in hand: –

9	8	7	6	5	4	3	2	1
				王	金				1
									2
歩	歩	歩	歩	歩	歩	歩	歩	歩	3
									4
									5
									6
歩	歩	歩	歩	歩	歩	歩	歩	歩	7
	角						飛		8
香	桂	銀	金	玉	金	銀	桂	香	9

☗ pieces in hand: –

Ishibashi (2012) also discusses a different 9-Piece Handicap variant that removes White right gold (右金落ち) instead of the left gold (左金落ち) shown above.

== See also ==
- Handicap (shogi)
- 10-Piece handicap
