= 4-Piece handicap =

4-Piece
☖ pieces in hand: –

9	8	7	6	5	4	3	2	1
	桂	銀	金	王	金	銀	桂		1
									2
歩	歩	歩	歩	歩	歩	歩	歩	歩	3
									4
									5
									6
歩	歩	歩	歩	歩	歩	歩	歩	歩	7
	角						飛		8
香	桂	銀	金	玉	金	銀	桂	香	9

☗ pieces in hand: –

The 4-Piece (四枚落ち yonmai-ochi) handicap in shogi has both of White's major pieces, the rook (飛) and the bishop (角), removed as well as their lances (香). Thus, White is left with pawns, golds, silvers, and knights.

Black has the usual setup of twenty pieces.

The 4-Piece handicap is an official handicap of the Japan Shogi Association.

== See also ==
- Handicap (shogi)
- Shogi opening

== Bibliography ==
- Fairbairn, John (1980). "Handicap series No. 6: Four piece handicap". Shogi (23): 6–7.
- Hodges, George, ed. (1979). "Historical game: 4 piece handicap". Shogi (20): 8–9. · irregular game from 1756
- Hodges, George, ed. (1981). "Professional overwhelms". Shogi (30): 2. · 4-Piece handicap games from 1981
- Hodges, George, ed. (1981). "Aono visits Netherlands". Shogi (32): 18. · Rook & Lance, 2-Piece, 4-Piece, and 6-Piece handicap games from 1981
- Hodges, George, ed. (1981). "Kaufman visits Japan". Shogi (33): 9. · Rook and 4-Piece handicap games from 1981 with commentary by Larry Kaufman
- Hosking, Tony (1996). The art of shogi. The Shogi Foundation. ISBN 978-0-95310-890-9.
- Kaufman, Larry (1983). "New ideas in handicap openings". Shogi (42): 13–15.
- 所司, 和晴 (2000). 駒落ち定跡. 毎日コミュニケーションズ. ISBN 4-8197-0209-2.
- Kitao, Madoka (2012). Edge attack at a glance. Translated by Kawasaki, Tomohide. Nekomado. ISBN 978-4-9052-2502-7.
