= Yoshio Ueki =

Japanese Go player

Personal information
- Native name: 植木善大 (Japanese); ウエキヨシオ (Japanese)
- Full name: Yoshio Ueki
- Born: February 25, 1969 (age 57) Osaka, Japan

Sport
- Turned pro: 1985
- Teacher: Yorimoto Yamashita
- Rank: 8 dan
- Affiliation: Nihon Ki-in, Kansai branch

Yoshio Ueki (植木善大, Ueki Yoshio; born February 25, 1969) is a professional Go player.

== Biography ==
Yoshio became a professional in 1985. He was promoted to 8 dan in 2003. He reached 400 career wins in 2003. He has three pupils, Takei Takashi, Yasuo Sakamoto and Yuri Tanemurasa. He is the head of the Kansai branch of the Nihon Ki-in.

== Promotion record ==
Rank	Year	Notes
1 dan	1985	
2 dan	1985	
3 dan	1987	
4 dan	1988	
5 dan	1990	
6 dan	1991	
7 dan	1994	
8 dan	2003	
9 dan	–	
