= Yoshio Kimura (shogi) =

Japanese shogi player (1905–1986)

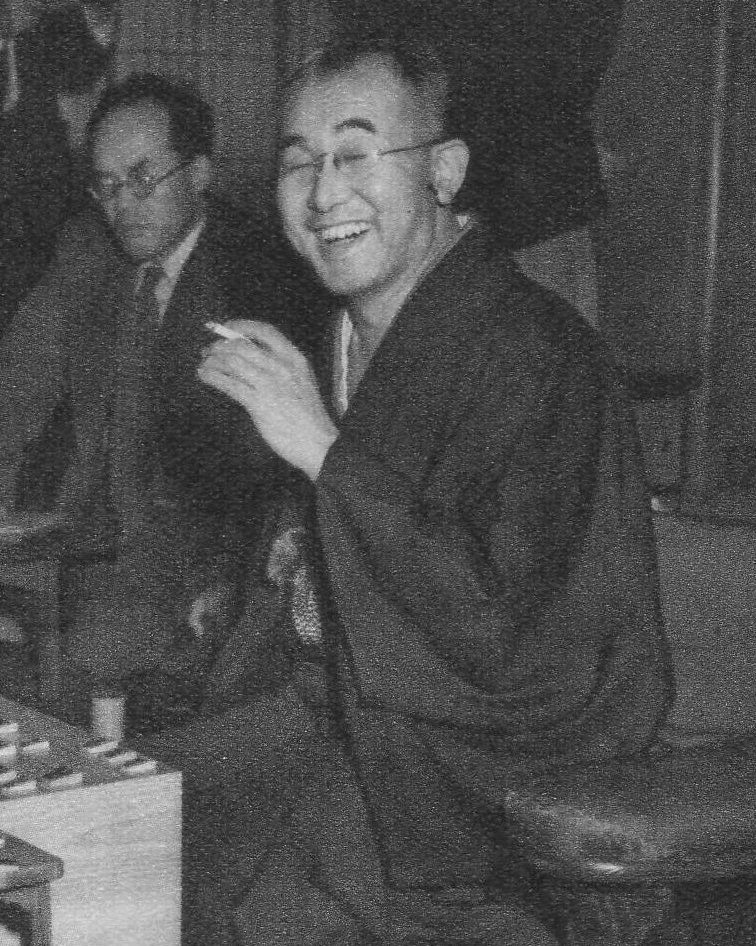
- Native name: 木村義雄
- Born: February 21, 1905
- Hometown: Sumida, Tokyo
- Nationality: Japanese
- Died: November 17, 1986 (aged 81)

Career
- Achieved professional status: January 1, 1920 (aged 14)
- Badge number: 2
- Rank: 8 dan
- Retired: August 24, 1952 (32 years)
- Teacher: Kinjirō Sekine
- Lifetime titles: Lifetime Meijin
- Major titles won: 8
- Tournaments won: 2

Websites
- JSA profile page

Yoshio Kimura (木村 義雄, Kimura Yoshio; February 21, 1905 – November 17, 1986) was a Japanese professional shogi player who achieved the rank of 8-dan (which was the highest dan level during his time).

He was a Lifetime Meijin who won the title eight times. At the time, the Meijin title was the only shogi title.

From December 1947 to March 1948 he was the first president of the Japan Shogi Association.

== Gallery ==
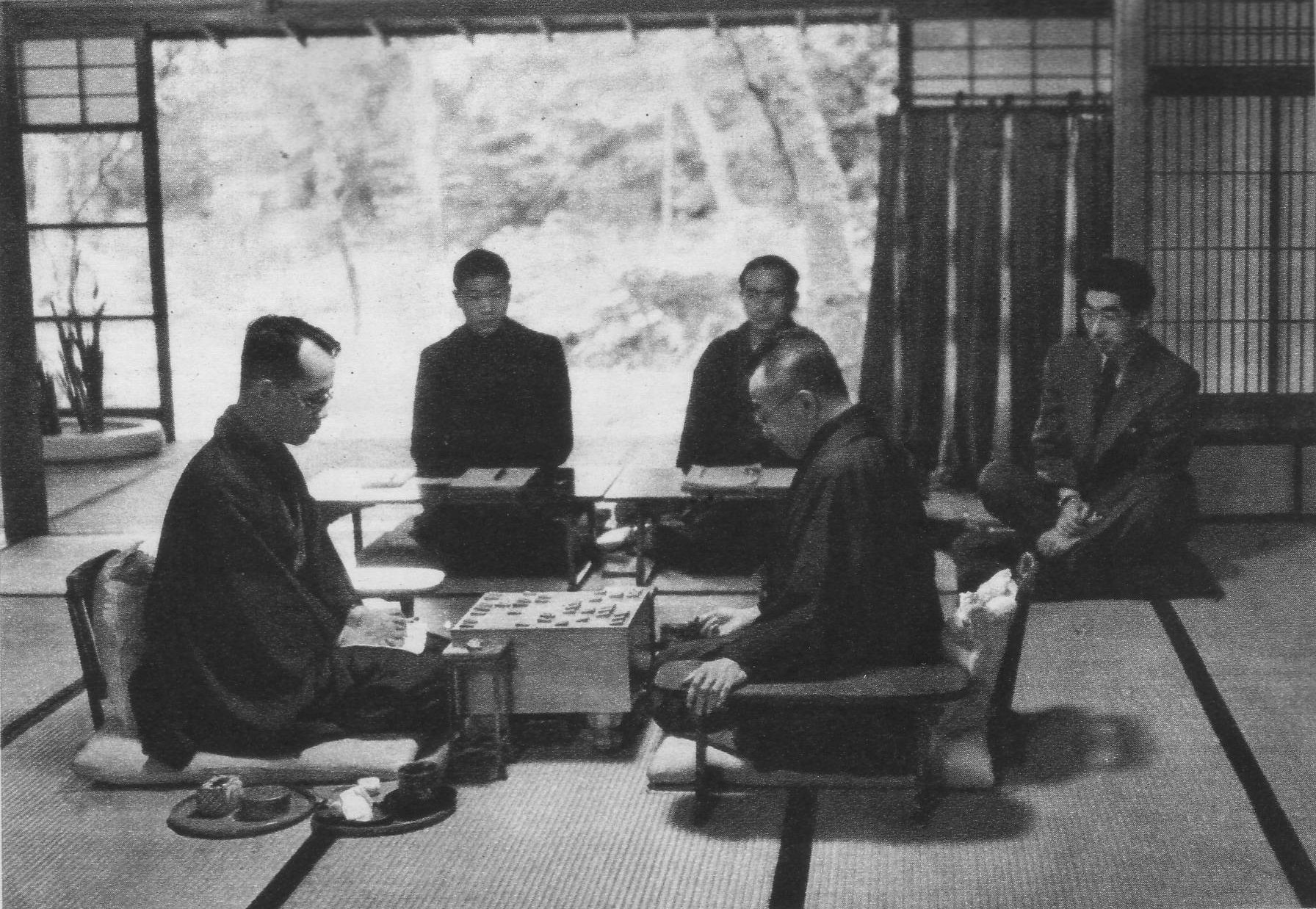
Kimura (right) playing against Yasuharu Ōyama in 1952 with Prince Chichibu present

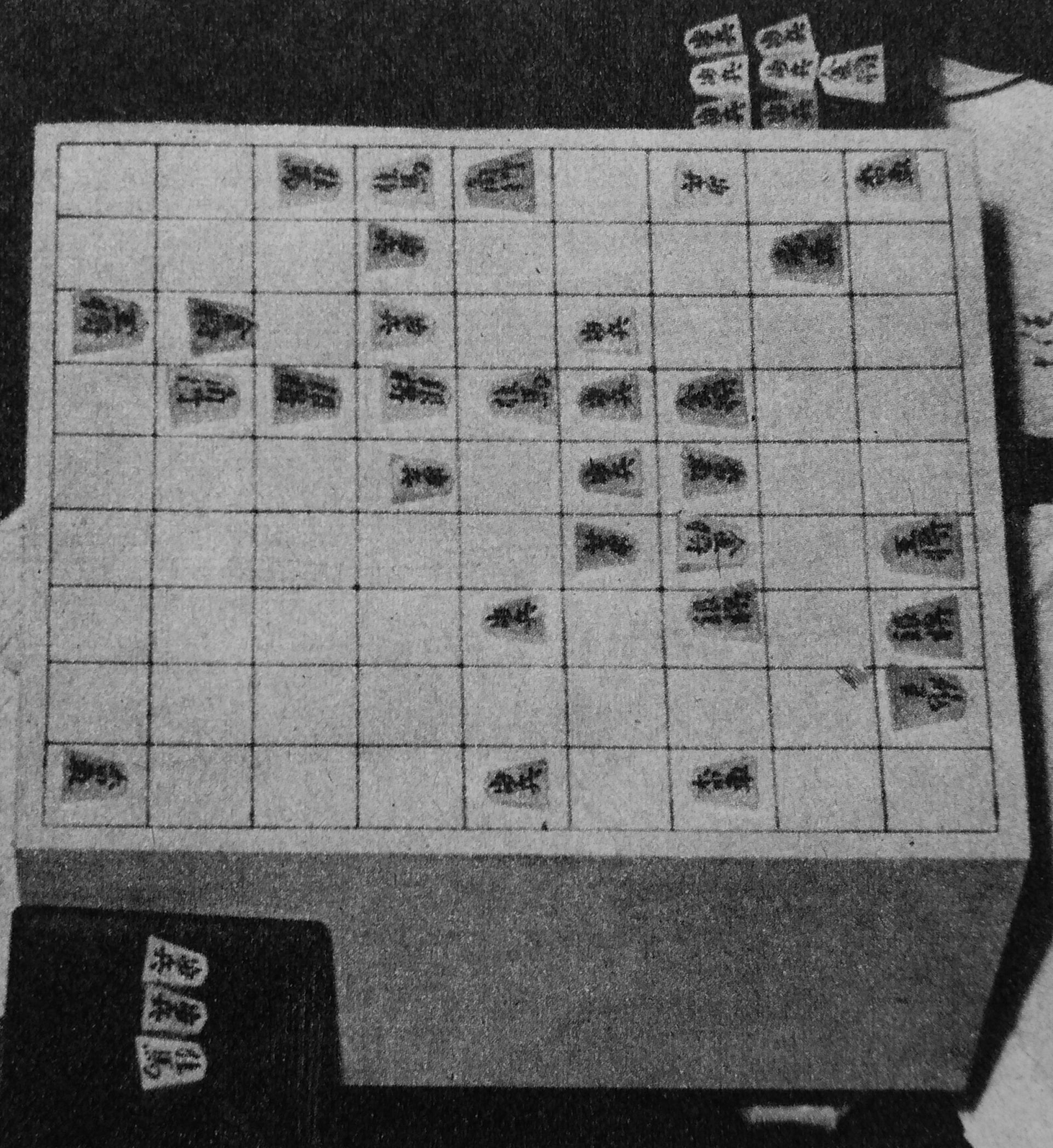
board when Ōyama defeated Kimura (1952 July 15)

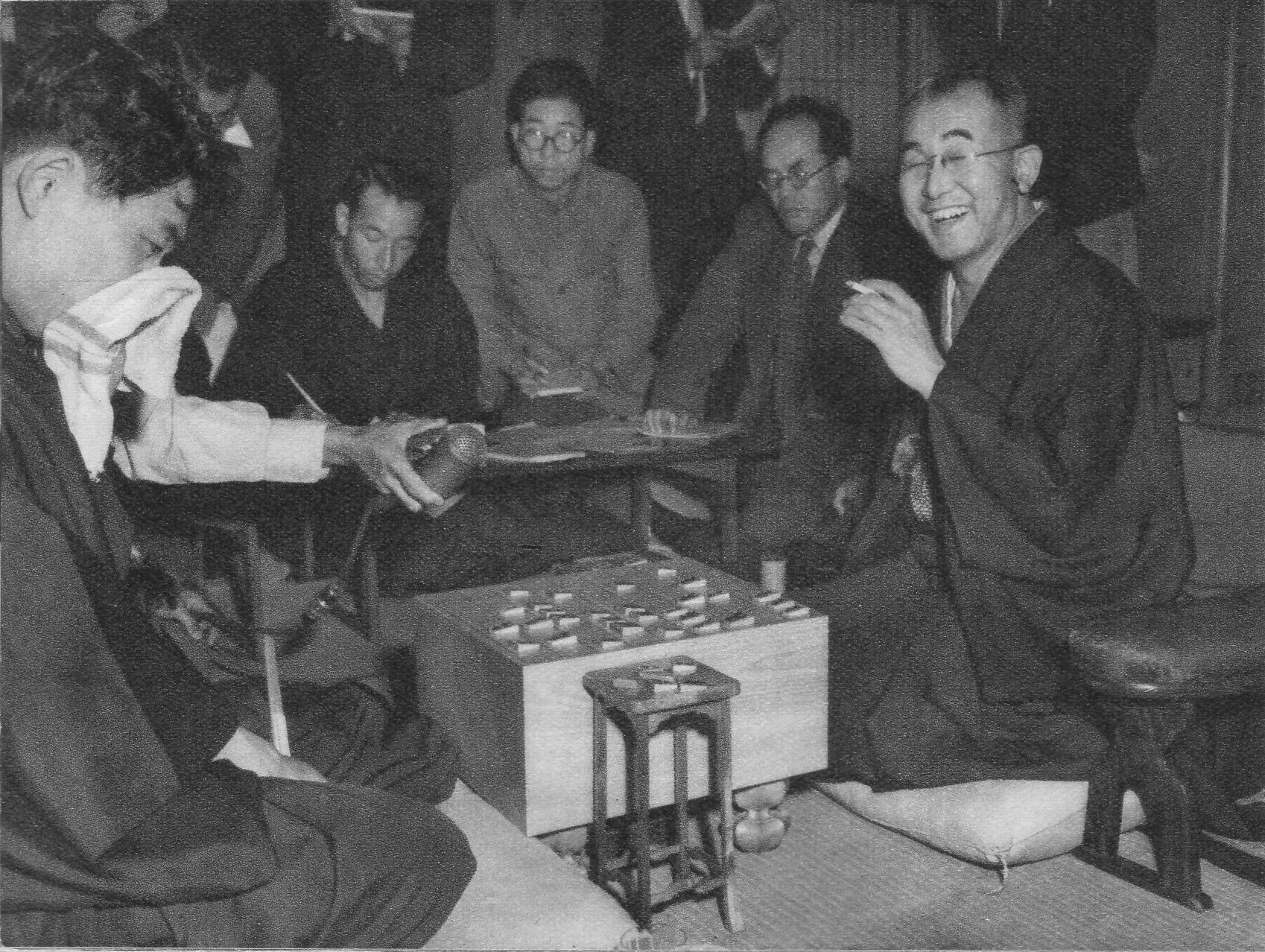
Kimura (1951 January 27)
