= List of March Comes In like a Lion episodes =

The cover of the first home video release volume, featuring the series' protagonist, Rei Kiriyama.

March Comes In like a Lion is an anime television series animated by Shaft, adapted from the manga series of the same name written and illustrated by Chica Umino. It features the life of Rei Kiriyama, an introvert and professional shogi player, who gradually develops both his play and his relationship with others. The first season aired between October 8, 2016, and March 18, 2017, on NHK G for a total of 22 episodes. The second season aired between October 14, 2017, and March 31, 2018, for a total of 22 episodes. Both seasons are licensed in North America by Aniplex of America and streamed by Crunchyroll, while Anime Limited has licensed the first season in the United Kingdom.

In the first season, the first opening and ending theme songs are "Answer" and "Fighter" by Bump of Chicken, respectively. The second opening theme song is "Goodbye Bystander" by Yuki and the second ending theme song is "Orion" by Kenshi Yonezu. In the second season, the first opening theme song is "Flag wo Tatero" (フラッグを立てろ; lit. 'Raise the Flag') by YUKI, while the first ending theme song is "Kafune" (カフネ) by Brian the Sun. The second opening theme song is "Haru ga Kite Bokura" (春が来てぼくら; lit. 'We of the Coming Spring') by Unison Square Garden and the second ending theme song is "I Am Standing" by Ruann.

The first season was directed by Kenjirou Okada and Akiyuki Shinbo, with Shinbo and Shaft (the latter as the collective name "Fuyashi Tou") taking on the role of series composition writers; while Yukito Kizawa, of Write Works, wrote the screenplay for the entirety of the series itself (sans a recap episode). Yukari Hashimoto composed the music for the series, and Nobuhiro Sugiyama (Shaft) designed the characters. Sugiyama served as chief animation director alongside Kazuya Shiotsuki (Shaft), and the two were helped out in episodes 2 and 3 by Manami Umeshita. 9-dan ranked shogi player Manabu Senzaki supervised the shogi. Five episodes were outsourced to Tezuka Productions: episodes 4, 6–7, 9, and 11. (Note: Outsourcing studios credited as Animation Assistance (アニメーション協力) on their respective episodes.)

The second season features most of the returning staff, including Okada, Shinbo, Shaft, Hashimoto, Kizawa, Sugiyama, Shiotsuki, and Senzaki. Episodes 7 and 10–22 of the second season also added Umeshita as a chief animation director once more. Eight episodes were outsourced to other studios: episodes 3, 10, 13, and 20 to Nomad; episodes 11 and 21 to Studio Elle; episode 16 to B.S.P; and episode 19 to Lapin Track.

== Episode list ==
=== Season 1 (2016–2017) ===
No. (overall)	No.	Title (Note: All English titles are taken from Crunchyroll.)	Directed by (Note: Information is taken from the ending credits of each episode.)	Storyboarded by	Original release date
1	1	"Rei Kiriyama"; Transliteration: "Kiriyama Rei" (Japanese: 桐山 零)	Kenjirou Okada	Shinsaku Sasaki	October 8, 2016
1	1	"The Town Along the River"; Transliteration: "Kawazoi no Machi" (Japanese: 河沿いの町)	Kenjirou Okada	Shinsaku Sasaki	October 8, 2016
Rei Kiriyama, a professional shogi player and high school student who lives alone in an apartment, visits his shogi teacher Masachika Kōda in a shogi hall. After Rei wins a match against Masachika, Rei is contacted by his friend Hinata Kawamoto, who invites him over to her house across town for dinner. After picking up groceries from the convenience store, Rei is awaited by Hinata, as well as her older sister Akari Kawamoto and younger sister Momo Kawamoto. While eating curry for dinner, Rei hears on the news that the body of Shizuo Unagawa was found badly bludgeoned in his own house, in which his eldest son Tadashi, a university student, has been arrested after being suspected of murder. When Rei goes to sleep, the sisters' grandfather Someji Kawamoto comes by and allows Rei to stay overnight. The next morning, Hinata wakes up late and rushes off to middle school. Later on, Rei eats lunch with high school teacher Takashi Hayashida on the school roof, where the latter expresses envy for professional shogi players. Rei then visits the wagashi shop run by the Kawamoto family. He finally arrives home, but encounters chubby professional shogi player Harunobu Nikaidō holding his mail.
2	2	"Akari"; Transliteration: "Akari" (Japanese: あかり)	Midori Yoshizawa	Kenichi Imaizumi	October 15, 2016
2	2	"Beyond the Bridge"; Transliteration: "Hashi no Mukō" (Japanese: 橋の向こう)	Midori Yoshizawa	Kenichi Imaizumi	October 15, 2016
The mail contained a letter notifying Rei of an upcoming shogi match, and Harunobu wanted to personally deliver it in hopes of creating a friendly longtime rivalry. Rei prepares for a qualifying match in a tournament for the NHK Cup at the shogi hall in Sendagaya. His opponent is Issa Matsumoto, shown with an enthusiastic personality and an aggressive attitude. Although Issa loses, his friend and fellow professional shogi player Tatsuyuki "Smith" Misumi forces Rei to treat them at a bar in Ginza where Akari works as a hostess. Rei reminisces about when he first met Akari outside the bar before she took him to her house in March Town for him to see Hinata and Momo. In the present, Rei crosses the bridge of June Town where he lives to get to the supermarket. He comes across the Kawamoto sisters in the supermarket, and he is invited over to their house in March Town for dinner. Rei tells Someji that his deceased parents are buried in Nagano. After having rice and chicken for dinner, Rei secretly wonders about his empty past. He leaves with leftovers that Akari gave him.
3	3	"Harunobu"; Transliteration: "Harunobu" (Japanese: 晴信)	Seimei Kidokoro	Toshimasa Suzuki	October 22, 2016
3	3	"Beyond the Night Sky"; Transliteration: "Yozora no Mukō" (Japanese: 夜空のむこう)	Seimei Kidokoro	Toshimasa Suzuki	October 22, 2016
In the past, Rei and Harunobu competed in the shogi semifinals at an amusement park during the summer. Harunobu never gave up during the match despite the scorching heat, but he eventually lost after running out of moves. In the present, Rei heads to the shogi hall and encounter Issa and Smith, who say that Harunobu is ready for his match. Rei and Harunobu engage in an intense shogi match. When Harunobu has Rei cornered, Rei remains calm and manages to win. Hanaoka, Harunobu's butler, has returned early from his vacation and takes Harunobu home. Harunobu is even more determined to win against Rei on their next match. Rei goes to the Kawamoto sisters' house at night for dinner. Akari lights a farewell ceremonial fire for the spirits of her deceased mother and grandmother, while explaining that she lit a welcoming ceremonial fire for them last night. When Hinata plans to go alone to the store in order to pick up some manga, Rei follows her and ends up at a pier, where she cries out for her deceased mother. Rei stays with Hinata for awhile as he contemplates his repressed feelings for losing his own biological family.
4	4	"Hina"; Transliteration: "Hina" (Japanese: ひな)	Tomoyuki Itamura	Mie Ooishi	October 29, 2016
4	4	"V.S."; Transliteration: "Buiesu" (Japanese: ブイエス)	Tomoyuki Itamura	Mie Ooishi	October 29, 2016
While Rei and Akari peel chestnuts to be boiled, they learn that Hinata likes a middle school student named Yūsuke Takahashi and wants to prepare a home-cooked meal for him. Rei returns home after accompanying Hinata to the supermarket in order to gather up the necessary ingredients for her. On the following Sunday, Hinata rushes to prepare the meal before heading out. Rei swings by Hinata's middle school and notices that Hinata is watching Takahashi play in a baseball game. After witnessing a home run by Takahashi, Rei realizes that Hinata is smitten with Takahashi. When Hinata is unable to deliver the meal to Takahashi, Rei prevents an upset Hinata from throwing it away and walks her home. After Rei and Akari taste the meal, it turns out to be unfortunately bittersweet and sour. Later on, Harunobu is motivated to develop a "Bishop Exchange crusher" silver bullet technique in order to win against Rei during a practice match. While getting something to eat, Rei and Harunobu run into the Kawamoto sisters, who invite them over for dinner. Attracted by Harunobu's physique, Akari feeds Harunobu the perfect meal. Hanaoka stops by the house and brings sweets from the wagashi shop.
5	5	"Agreement"; Transliteration: "Keiyaku" (Japanese: 契約)	Takashi Kawabata	Takashi Kawabata	November 5, 2016
5	5	"Over the Cuckoo's Nest"; Transliteration: "Kakkō no Su no Ue de" (Japanese: カッコーの巣の上で)	Takashi Kawabata	Takashi Kawabata	November 5, 2016
As a child, Rei played shogi often with Masachika, who was a friend of Rei's biological father. Rei picks up Momo from daycare as a favor from Akari. On their way home, Momo gets hurt after crossing paths with a barking white dog, prompting Rei to rescue her. Rei begins to break down after cleaning up Momo's wounds. When Akari and Hinata return, Rei leaves their house, as he recalls the death of his parents and sister during his childhood. At the funeral, Rei's relatives arrived to pay their respects, and he agreed to be adopted by Masachika into a life of shogi. Rei lived with Masachika's hot-tempered daughter Kyōko Kōda and secluded son Ayumu Kōda. Ayumu decided to quit playing shogi due to Rei's performance, while Kyōko was also forced to quit despite her passion. Kyōko spent her time running around town, and Ayumu shut himself in his bedroom playing video games. After seeing a documentary about the common cuckoo chick, Rei decided to leave the Kōda family in order to become a professional shogi player thereafter. It is revealed that Masachika gave Rei the green sweater that he currently wears.
6	6	"Child of God (Part One)"; Transliteration: "Kamisama no Kodomo (Ichi)" (Japanese: 神さまの子供 1)	Sou Toyama	Hiroko Kazui	November 12, 2016
6	6	"Child of God (Part Two)"; Transliteration: "Kamisama no Kodomo (Ni)" (Japanese: 神さまの子供 2)	Sou Toyama	Hiroko Kazui	November 12, 2016
Hayashida learns that Rei will not be participating in the high school study camp this year due his career as a professional shogi player. Rei faintly remembers the harsh words that Kyōko told him in the past, but he believed that there was a place where he belonged if he could support himself with shogi alone. When he first moved into an unfurnished apartment, he spent much time on shogi and some time in school. Rei lost two consecutive shogi matches in the second year of his career, causing him to figuratively swim across the ocean until reaching the shoreline. Hayashida then has a conversation with Rei about professional shogi player Tōji Sōya, who has held the title of Meijin since he was in middle school. As Rei leaves the high school, he runs into Hinata outside a fast-food restaurant. After Rei treats her to a meal, Hinata musters up the courage to invite Rei over to her house. This leads Rei to reflect on the Kawamoto sisters. Takahashi suddenly appears at the fast-food restaurant, causing Hinata to run away in embarrassment and Rei to be intimidated by Takahashi's massive stature.
7	7	"Child of God (Part Three)"; Transliteration: "Kamisama no Kodomo (San)" (Japanese: 神さまの子供 3)	Hidekazu Hara	Shinsaku Sasaki	November 19, 2016
7	7	"Important Things. Important Matters."; Transliteration: "Taisetsu na Mono. Taisetsu na Koto." (Japanese: 大切なもの。大切なこと。)	Hidekazu Hara	Shinsaku Sasaki	November 19, 2016
7	7	"Teach Me How to Play Shogi"; Transliteration: "Shōgi Oshiete" (Japanese: 将棋おしえて)	Hidekazu Hara	Shinsaku Sasaki	November 19, 2016
After Takahashi recognizes Rei as a professional shogi player, Rei talks about his decision that he made about returning to high school after going professional. Before Takahashi leaves the fast-food restaurant, Rei and Takahashi exchange contact information just as Hinata returns from the girls' restroom. Rei walks Hinata to her house, then arrives at his apartment to contemplate how he made a difference in Takahashi's life. On Saturday at the Kawamoto sisters' house, Takahashi comes over in order to ask Rei more about shogi. Hinata is able to prepare home-cooked egg and chicken curry for dinner before Akari has to go to work at the bar. Hinata and Momo realize that Rei is a professional shogi player after watching a video recording of his televised losing match in the NHK Cup. After Someji comes home, Rei becomes fired up upon listening to Harunobu's commentary on his bad move during the match. Later on, Rei and Harunobu end up meeting each other at the store, and they go to the Kawamoto sisters' house in order to teach Hinata and Momo the basics of shogi. When Rei becomes too technical in his explanation, Harunobu tries a more fundamental approach.
8	8	"Teach Me How to Play Shogi (Continued)"; Transliteration: "Shōgi Oshiete (Shōzen)" (Japanese: 将棋おしえて (承前))	Midori Yoshizawa	Midori Yoshizawa	December 3, 2016
8	8	"Image"; Transliteration: "Omokage" (Japanese: 面影)	Midori Yoshizawa	Midori Yoshizawa	December 3, 2016
8	8	"Distant Thunder (Part One)"; Transliteration: "Enrai (Ichi)" (Japanese: 遠雷 1)	Midori Yoshizawa	Midori Yoshizawa	December 3, 2016
Harunobu describes to Hinata and Momo about the unique movements of the shogi pieces, which include the pawn, the lance, the knight, the silver general, the gold general, the rook, the bishop and the king. Rei is surprised to learn that Harunobu has written and illustrated a cat-themed children's book about shogi. Harunobu then follows Rei back to his apartment and gives him a futon as a housewarming gift. Later on, Issa and Smith tell Rei that Harunobu's commentary about Rei's losing match was due to Harunobu striving to face off against Rei in the finals. With having three wins and three losses, Rei now faces the possibility of dropping down a class if he gets two degradation points. While Akari, Hinata, Momo and Someji are fascinated with shogi, Rei reflects on how his biological father might feel about him being a professional shogi player. Upon arriving back at the apartment, Rei finds Kyōko outside, and he is forced to let her inside and stay the night. In the morning, Kyōko rattles Rei about the implications of winning his rank-deciding match against an older professional shogi player named Shōichi Matsunaga.
9	9	"Distant Thunder (Part Two)"; Transliteration: "Enrai (Ni)" (Japanese: 遠雷 2)	Sayaka Iwai	Kazuya Sakamoto	December 10, 2016
9	9	"Distant Thunder (Part Three)"; Transliteration: "Enrai (San)" (Japanese: 遠雷 3)	Sayaka Iwai	Kazuya Sakamoto	December 10, 2016
Rei is torn between winning the match and putting Matsunaga out of retirement after being a professional shogi player for forty years or throwing the match and demoting himself down a class. During the match in the shogi hall, Rei is unable to determine Matsunaga's strategy, yet Rei calls Matsunaga's bluff of a trap and still manages to win. Afterwards, Rei treats Matsunaga to some grilled eel, in which Matsunaga confesses that Masachika had no personality while Kyōko was a true femme fatale. Matsunaga then explains that his hometown of Fukushima was ruled in 1643 by minor feudal lord Hoshina Masayuki, who proposed important policies for the greater good. With Matsunaga heavily drunk, Rei follows him to the pier, where Matsunaga admits that he knew all about Rei for awhile. Although Matsunaga felt afraid before the match, he motivated himself to face Rei in order to overcome his fear of losing. However, now that Matsunaga has lost, he has decided not to quit playing shogi, thanks to Rei. Sadly, Matsunaga wants to continue playing shogi in order to get out of doing household chores for his family.
10	10	"Something Given (Part 1)"; Transliteration: "Okurareta Mono (Ichi)" (Japanese: 贈られたもの 1)	Yukihiro Miyamoto (Note: Assisted by Naoaki Shibuta.)	Mamoru Kurosawa	December 17, 2016
10	10	"Something Given (Part 2)"; Transliteration: "Okurareta Mono (Ni)" (Japanese: 贈られたもの 2)	Yukihiro Miyamoto	Mamoru Kurosawa	December 17, 2016
With Christmas Day soon approaching, Rei receives a call from Kyōko, who left her watch at his apartment. He meets her at the pier and returns the watch, but Kyōko mentions that Rei's upcoming opponent Manabu Yasui is planning to divorce his wife. Moreover, Yasui only becomes drunk and goes out gambling if he loses a shogi match. Kyōko even says that Yasui's daughter wishes to be with him until Christmas Day. Rei recalls that Masachika gave him new shogi pieces one Christmas Day long ago, while Kyōko and Ayumu each received a teddy bear and a handheld game console respectively. At school, Hayashida invites Rei to the class Christmas party after going over his good grades, but Rei leaves before Hayashida can get an answer. Rei heads to the shogi hall in order to have his year-end match against Yasui. After a tough match, Yasui resigns due to making a crucial mistake in his gameplay. Rei then follows Yasui outside and returns his gift bag, which Yasui angrily accepts before muttering that this will be his last Christmas Day with his family. Rei runs to a park and yells out his frustration about Yasui being a "weak player".
11	11	"The Old Year"; Transliteration: "Yuku Toshi" (Japanese: ゆく年)	Seimei Kidokoro	Kenjirou Okada	December 24, 2016
11	11	"The New Year"; Transliteration: "Kuru Toshi" (Japanese: くる年)	Seimei Kidokoro	Kenjirou Okada	December 24, 2016
During New Year's Eve, Rei is cooped in his apartment with a fever. The Kawamoto sisters make an unexpected visit and take Rei to their house for him to recover there. Rei realizes from Akari that Masachika has been contacting Rei repeatedly when his cellphone was off. While Hinata, Momo and Someji take a nap, Akari feeds Rei some rice with pickled plums while talking about how her late mother did the same thing when she was sick. During New Year's Day, Hinata realizes that the postcards have come in the mailbox. She quickly runs to retrieve Rei's postcards from his apartment, in which he receives a postcard from Harunobu as well as Takanori Jingūji, chairman of the Japan Shogi Association. Misaki, the aunt of the Kawamoto sisters, arrives and tells Someji that Akari deserves to work at the bar instead of taking care of the house all the time. Akari and Hinata prepare an exquisite dinner for everyone. Misaki leaves after dinner, while Rei goes to the guest room when Akari explains that the dining area is made into an impromptu changing area since the bathroom is next to the dining area. Rei comfortably falls asleep afterwards.
11.5	11.5	"Omnibus Special Episode"; Transliteration: "Zenhan Sōshūhen" (Japanese: 前半総集編)	Eita Higashikubo	-	December 29, 2016
This episode is a recap of the first eleven episodes. Note: This is the only episode to not be written by Yukito Kizawa. Miku Ooshima, one of Shaft's board members and producers, is instead credited for screenplay.
12	12	"What Lies on the Opposite Shore"; Transliteration: "Taigan ni Aru Mono" (Japanese: 対岸にあるもの)	Yoshiko Mikami	Mie Ooishi	January 7, 2017
12	12	"Black River (Part 1)"; Transliteration: "Kuroi Kawa (Ichi)" (Japanese: 黒い河 1)	Yoshiko Mikami	Mie Ooishi	January 7, 2017
After returning to his apartment a couple of days later, Rei walks outside and compares the Kawamoto sisters' house to a warm kotatsu. Having three rank-deciding matches left this season with four wins and three losses, his focus is on the qualifying match for the upcoming Shishio Tournament, which is sponsored by a big newspaper company and has generous prize money in store. Rei wins his qualifying match against his opponent Takeshi Tsujii, known for his strong offensive power and lame jokes. Meanwhile, Smith wins his qualifying match after he leads his opponent Okuyasu Yokomizo into a flawless trap. In the lobby, Rei and Smith later encounter professional shogi player Masamune Gotō, who apparently views Kyōko as a stalker. Smith tries to restrain a riled up Rei as Gotō takes his leave. Jingūji comes by with a haul of rockfish, sardines and flounder, so Smith and Rei each take some fish with them. Rei delivers his fish to Akari at the Kawamoto sisters' house. After dinner, Hinata and Momo are saddened that Rei cannot stay overnight this time, though they support him in doing his best for the semifinal match in the tournament against Kai Shimada.
13	13	"Black River (Part 2)"; Transliteration: "Kuroi Kawa (Ni)" (Japanese: 黒い河 2)	Takashi Kawabata	Takashi Kawabata	January 14, 2017
13	13	"Beyond the Door"; Transliteration: "Tobira no Mukō" (Japanese: 扉の向こう)	Takashi Kawabata	Takashi Kawabata	January 14, 2017
The following day, Smith gets ready in the morning and passes by Rei in the shogi hall making copies of past game records of Shimada and Gotō. This leads Smith to conclude that he lacks the vision of beating Gotō in the semifinal match and facing Shimada himself. During the match, Smith plans to use the Pinwheel as a counterattack against the Bear-in-the-hole Static Rook that Gotō usually uses. It is revealed that this is the second time that Smith played against Gotō, in which Smith lost the first time. Surprisingly, Gotō sacrifices his rook in order to strike back. Smith resigns and loses the match, as Gotō advises Smith to be decisive with his moves next time. While trying to decide how to get over his losing match, Smith then finds a stray cat outside. After Rei reviews Shimada's game records, he is unable to find anything that stands out. During the match, Rei and Shimada create a Double Fortress to protect the kings, but Shimada plays a knight to eventually trap Rei from attacking at all. Shimada previously spoke with Harunobu, who requested Shimada to crush Rei's pride during the semifinal match.
14	14	"Blinding Darkness"; Transliteration: "Mabushii Yami" (Japanese: まぶしい闇)	Yukihiro Miyamoto	Shinsaku Sasaki	January 21, 2017
14	14	"Just a Little Water"; Transliteration: "Honno Sukoshi no Mizu" (Japanese: ほんの少しの水)	Yukihiro Miyamoto	Shinsaku Sasaki	January 21, 2017
Although drowned by his own shame of underestimating Shimada, Rei calms down and plays on. However, Rei eventually resigns and loses the match, while Shimada gives a post-match review in order to show that Rei would have lost in any case. Rei runs out the shogi hall, while Smith and Shimada discuss that Rei is inexperienced at reading his opponents. As Shimada now focuses on his upcoming match against Gotō, Smith returns to his apartment in order to take care of his stray cat. Rei obsessively goes over the game records in his bed. He struggles to keep himself hydrated, practically crawling to the convenience store in order to get food. Determined to continue playing shogi as a means to play his rent, he decides to go back to high school and hopefully graduate in two years. After feeling uncoordinated during physical education class, Rei has mixed emotions about running away. During lunch, Hayashida joins Rei on the stairwell, where Hayashida suggests for Rei to go back to Masachika's house. Hayashida also mentions that Shimada hosts a shogi workshop, though Rei is doubtful in attending it. Elsewhere, Shimada tells Harunobu that Rei needs to make the first move.
15	15	"Moonlight"; Transliteration: "Gekkō" (Japanese: 月光)	Yuuichi Wada	Mie Ooishi	January 28, 2017
15	15	"Lump of Ego"; Transliteration: "Jiga no Katamari" (Japanese: 自我のカタマリ)	Yuuichi Wada	Mie Ooishi	January 28, 2017
At night, Kyōko cuddles next to Rei in bed. In the morning, Kyōko plans to run away, being in love with Gotō despite him having a comatose wife. Kyōko berates Rei for always basing life on shogi, though Rei says that no one would care if he ran away. Although Rei accumulated a lot of school absences, Hayashida still suggests for Rei to watch the first of three matches of the finals at the shogi hall. With Harunobu and Smith also observing, Rei watches a fascinating match between Shimada and Gotō, in which Gotō wins the match. At the wagashi shop, Someji tells Hinata and Akari that Rei lost in the tournament, and they should give Rei some space for now. On the following day, the second match of the finals begins. Hayashida gives Rei all of the study materials to fill in, seeing that Rei's attendance record is slipping. Harunobu, Issa, Smith and Yokomizo witness an intense match between Shimada and Gotō, in which Shimada wins the match. Shimada later learns that Rei was the one who destroyed Harunobu's "lump of ego" in shogi during childhood and made Harunobu realize that he is not alone.
16	16	"Running Through the Night"; Transliteration: "Yoru o Kakeru" (Japanese: 夜を駆ける)	Sayaka Iwai	Hiroko Kazui	February 4, 2017
16	16	"Middle of the Slope"; Transliteration: "Saka no Tochū" (Japanese: 坂の途中)	Sayaka Iwai	Hiroko Kazui	February 4, 2017
Hayashida has Rei make up an assignment for chemistry class, receiving help from Eisaku Noguchi, president of the After School Bunsen Burners Club. Noguchi creates bars of soap with a mugwort chocolate banana fragrance, though Rei accidentally creates a mugwort grapefruit fragrance as a better idea. Noguchi agrees to help Rei after Hayashida explains Rei's working situation. Afterwards, Hayashida encourages Rei to rely on others, which reminds Rei of the Kawamoto sisters. Rei later arrives at the shogi hall, and he learns that Shimada won the third match of the finals. Shimada now qualifies as a challenger in a title match against Sōya. While Harunobu gets tea for Shimada, Rei asks to join the shogi workshop. Rei meets up with Shimada at the shogi workshop in his house, where Harunobu and attendee Morio Shigeta have also come to learn. Following some practice matches, Shimada comments on Morio's Cheerful Central Rook played in response to Harunobu's Static Rook. After an hour of analyzing their match, Rei, Harunobu and Morio are stopped by Shimada due to a stomachache. At the pier, Rei and Harunobu still analyze their match, but they are distracted when a bird suddenly dives into the river.
17	17	"Silver Thread"; Transliteration: "Gin no Ito" (Japanese: 銀の糸)	Takashi Kawabata	Takashi Kawabata	February 11, 2017
17	17	"Water's Surface"; Transliteration: "Suimen" (Japanese: 水面)	Takashi Kawabata	Takashi Kawabata	February 11, 2017
17	17	"Base of the Blue Night"; Transliteration: "Aoi Yoru no Soko" (Japanese: 青い夜の底)	Takashi Kawabata	Takashi Kawabata	February 11, 2017
Rei arrives at a hotel in Tokyo, where the first title match between Sōya and Shimada will take place. Masachika asks Rei about his prize money deposited into Masachika's banks account, and after a back-and-forth where Rei expresses his wish to repay Masachika, he ultimately decides to hang onto the money until Rei becomes an adult. Masachika then wonders about Kyōko, hearing that she often stays at Rei's apartment. Rei wanders towards a koi pond and spots Sōya during a downpour, but Jingūji quickly covers up Sōya and takes him back inside for the reception. Sōya is revealed to be the youngest professional shogi player to ever hold the title of Meijin. According to Shimada, there are seven title matches in various locations, and he must win twice against Sōya to play in his hometown, the sixth location. Rei is later interrupted by the Kawamoto sisters during a confrontation with Kyōko. Hinata still gives Rei a boxed meal before returning to Akari and Momo. Kyōko follows Rei to his apartment and eats the boxed meal, ultimately staying overnight. As Kyōko leaves the next day, Rei reflects that she is neither his sibling nor stranger. Rei arrives at the shogi workshop and contemplates the beginning of a new spring.
18	18	"Torrent"; Transliteration: "Honryū" (Japanese: 奔流)	Yoshiko Mikami	Shinsaku Sasaki	February 18, 2017
18	18	"Passing Time"; Transliteration: "Heru Toki" (Japanese: 経る時)	Yoshiko Mikami	Shinsaku Sasaki	February 18, 2017
During the shogi workshop, Harunobu and Morio have a heated analysis based on Shimada's board setup of his losing qualifying match of the tournament the previous year. However, Shimada silences them with a game record that stated a checkmate within forty-five moves. Rei adds that the board setup is unsettling. Shimada invites Rei over the following afternoon. Rei learns that Shimada lost the first two title matches in Tokyo and Nagano, while the sixth title match is in Shimada's hometown of Yamagata. They begin a practice match, but Rei starts to become pulled under by a figurative raging river. Rei was dreaming in his bathtub, realizing that Shimada wanted something from him. Later, Rei thanks Hayashida for helping him accomplish his good grades, though Hayashida recognizes Rei's independence at a young age. As Rei begins his spring vacation, he worries about Shimada's third title match in Tokushima. Hinata and Momo swing by Rei's apartment in order to interrogate Rei about Kyōko, using the excuse to pick up the meal boxes. Once Hinata and Momo inform Akari at their house that Kyōko is Rei's sister, Akari begins to wonder why Rei left his family home long ago.
19	19	"Passing the Night"; Transliteration: "Yoru o Iku" (Japanese: 夜を往く)	Hajime Ootani	Hajime Ootani	February 25, 2017
19	19	"Kyoto (Part 1)"; Transliteration: "Kyōto (Ichi)" (Japanese: 京都 1)	Hajime Ootani	Hajime Ootani	February 25, 2017
Shimada recalls how he became a professional shogi player during childhood in Yamagata, but he has been having issues with his stomach due to constantly traveling by bus. In the present, Rei visits Shimada and feeds him some noodles for lunch. With the fourth title match in Kyoto coming up in five days, Shimada racked his brain over what sealed move that he could have used against Sōya in his losing third title match. When Rei and Shimada begin a practice match, Shimada admits that Rei sounded just like Sōya when Rei commented on the "unsettling board setup" from before. Shimada compares himself to a tortoise and Sōya to a crane. Despite his worsened stomach condition, Shimada is the only challenger from his hometown. Rei comes with Shimada to Kyoto in order to make sure things go smoothly. They arrive at the hotel where the fourth title match will take place, and Rei takes Shimada to his hotel room in order to rest. Later after leaving the reception partway, Shimada informs Rei that Smith is an assistant observer and will be sharing a hotel room with Rei. When the fourth title match begins, Rei worries about Shimada's health.
20	20	"Kyoto (Part 2)"; Transliteration: "Kyōto (Ni)" (Japanese: 京都 2)	Midori Yoshizawa	Shinsaku Sasaki	March 4, 2017
20	20	"Kyoto (Part 3)"; Transliteration: "Kyōto (San)" (Japanese: 京都 3)	Midori Yoshizawa	Shinsaku Sasaki	March 4, 2017
Shimada has a dream of reuniting with his girlfriend and family in his hometown, though this fantasy shows that he never became a professional shogi player. On the second day of the fourth title match, Rei continues to worry that Shimada will incur four consecutive losses before reaching Yamagata. Harunobu is informed by Rei that Shimada did not want to trouble Harunobu since he would make a big fuss over Shimada's health. After Tsujii, assigned as the official observer, is caught for having the flu, Jingūji then promotes Smith as the new official observer and Rei as a cocommentator alongside passionate professional shogi player Raidō Fujimoto. During the match, it seems that Sōya has Shimada trapped just by using a rook and a pawn. Fujimoto already predicts that Shimada will lose for the fourth time, though Rei sees a way that Shimada can still win. Although Sōya reveals a way that his king could have been put in check in the post-match review, Shimada concedes without noticing that path and incurs his fourth consecutive loss, thereby ending the Shishio Tournament. As Rei watches Shimada sleep while they travel back home, Rei thinks about the path that Shimada had taken, representing that of a raging storm.
21	21	"When the Cherry Blossoms Bloom"; Transliteration: "Sakura no Hana no Saku Koro" (Japanese: 桜の花の咲く頃)	Yukihiro Miyamoto	Hiroshi Hamasaki	March 11, 2017
21	21	"Small Murmur"; Transliteration: "Chīsana Tsubuyaki" (Japanese: 小さなつぶやき)	Yukihiro Miyamoto	Hiroshi Hamasaki	March 11, 2017
The Kawamoto sisters enjoy some onigiri under the cherry blossoms, while Rei and Shimada arrive in Tendō during the rainy weather. Rei and Shimada are cocommentators for a "human shogi" match between Harunobu and Yokomizo at the city's Cherry Blossom Festival. Harunobu wins the match after ninety-six moves. Afterwards, Jingūji attempts to back out of the hundred-move event, while also mentioning that Tsujii bombed his speech at the opening ceremony. During the event, Harunobu, Shimada, Yokomizo and Jingūji display their skills against various amateur shogi players. A local journalist named Izumida talks with Rei about Shimada and his contribution to the senior community. Both Rei and Izumida come to realize that they are becoming totally enamored with Shimada. The next day, Shimada prepares to leave by train with Rei and Harunobu. Meanwhile, Someji gathers ideas from the Kawamoto sisters for mochi with a new flavor and look. Someji decides on a snowman design with two options of sweet bean paste. Rei comes by the Kawamoto sisters' house for dinner, sharing all the food that he received from Shimada's hometown. Hinata dreams of making sweets and running the wagashi shop when she grows up.
22	22	"New School Term"; Transliteration: "Shingakki" (Japanese: 新学期)	Kenjirou Okada	Tomohiko Itō	March 18, 2017
22	22	"Fighter"; Transliteration: "Faitā" (Japanese: ファイター)	Kenjirou Okada	Tomohiko Itō	March 18, 2017
When the new school term begins, Rei struggles to join the various cliques. With two years until high school graduation, Rei focuses on an upcoming ten-match Rookie Tournament for a rank-deciding competition, though Rei and Harunobu will be placed in separate blocks for this tournament. Rei has lunch with Hayashida at the stairwell, where they discuss about making a Shogi Club together, in which Rei agrees for Hayashida to be the club advisor. However, since none of the other students are interested in joining, Hayashida turns to Noguchi, who is harvesting nattō in the chemistry lab. When Hayashida invites Noguchi to join the Shogi Club, Noguchi explains that the upperclassmen of the After School Bunsen Burners Club have graduated, cutting the members short. Hayashida comes up with the idea of combining clubs, thereby becoming the After School Shogi Science Club. Rei remembers that no one would sit next to him on the bus during a school field trip when he was a child. Nevertheless, shogi gave him a place to belong as someone would always sit in front of him during matches since he was a kid. Rei eventually realizes that many people were traveling on the same path of shogi with him.

=== Season 2 (2017–2018) ===
No. (overall)	No.	Title	Directed by	Storyboarded by	Original release date
23	1	"Setting Sun"; Transliteration: "Nishibi" (Japanese: 西陽)	Hajime Ootani	Hajime Ootani	October 14, 2017
23	1	"Ramune"; Transliteration: "Ramune" (Japanese: ラムネ)	Hajime Ootani	Hajime Ootani	October 14, 2017
At the start of May, Rei Kiriyama begins activities in the After School Shogi Science Club with Eisaku Noguchi, who lost his first practice match despite having a written plan of attack. After Rei explains to Noguchi that the goal of shogi is to capture the opponent's king, Takashi Hayashida becomes upset over losing in computer shogi. Although Rei says shogi can be frustrating at times after losing, he does not answer whether or not he enjoys playing shogi. Noguchi gives Rei some tear grass tea to calm down. Hayashida and Noguchi discuss that Tōji Sōya lost the first title match in the Championship Series against challenger Kengo Kumakura. The first day of the second title match is broadcast on television. Based on a conversation between Masachika Kōda and Takanori Jingūji, it is shown that Kumakura devoured three cakes while Sōya added many lemon slices and glucose cubes to his tea during the match. The After School Shogi Science Club create homemade ramune candy. Rei finally found a fun club that he belongs in. He wraps up a handful of ramune candy in order to bring some to Akari Kawamoto, Hinata Kawamoto and Momo Kawamoto at their house.
24	2	"Chaos"; Transliteration: "Konton" (Japanese: 混沌)	Midori Yoshizawa	Takashi Kawabata	October 21, 2017
24	2	"Kumakura"; Transliteration: "Kumakura" (Japanese: 隈倉)	Midori Yoshizawa	Takashi Kawabata	October 21, 2017
In the practice room of the shogi hall, professional shogi player Sakutarō Yanagihara tells two journalists that the Championship Series between Sōya and Kumakura is heating up. Issa Matsumoto and Tatsuyuki "Smith" Misumi stop Rei and Harunobu Nikaidō from causing a commotion. Masamune Gotō berates the journalists for speaking ill of Kai Shimada, which causes the journalists to leave. Gotō soon leaves to prepare for his upcoming game. However, he meets Kyōko Kōda outside. During the seventh title match on the second day, Sōya plays a bishop in an awkward spot and causes Kumakura to resign from the Championship Series. Yanagihara tells Rei and Harunobu that Sōya would win by checkmate in seventeen moves. After Kyōko picks up some lotion for Gotō, he visits his comatose wife Misako in the hospital. Gotō returns to his apartment, only to find Kyōko sitting outside the door with his dry cleaning. He is reluctant to let her inside, though he ties her up in bed before he falls asleep. The next day, Kumakura leaves Hakone via express train, while Jingūji tells Yanagihara that Kumakura frustratingly kicked a hole in the wall of his hotel room after losing the Championship Series.
25	3	"June"; Transliteration: "Rokugatsu" (Japanese: 六月)	Yoshiko Mikami	Mamoru Kurosawa	October 28, 2017
25	3	"Ladybug Bush (Part 1)"; Transliteration: "Tentō Chū no Ki (Ichi)" (Japanese: てんとう虫の木 1)	Yoshiko Mikami	Mamoru Kurosawa	October 28, 2017
Issa and Smith are surprised that Kumakura will be participating in the qualifying match for the Kiryu Championship. During lunch, Harunobu tells Rei that they each must win three matches in the Rookie Tournament to reach the finals together. Harunobu is aware that Rei plans on using the Rookie Tournament to move up a class. Meanwhile, Someji Kawamoto gathers ideas from the Kawamoto sisters for another new treat, ultimately deciding on an edible sandal inside a block of jelly. Akari shows concern over Hinata, who has something deep on her mind. The next day, Rei buys an egg salad sandwich from a bakery previously recommended by Akari. Having lunch outside, Rei comes across a bush where ladybugs lay their eggs. In the past, Rei realized the true meaning of loneliness after he first moved from Nagano to Tokyo following the death of his biological family. Kyōko and Ayumu Kōda became jealous when Rei was very obedient to his adoptive mother. Despite that, Rei studied and played shogi tediously until he became a professional shogi player. In the present, Rei returns to Akari and Momo with donuts from the bakery. Hinata comes home in tears wearing two different shoes.
26	4	"Ladybug Bush (Part 2)"; Transliteration: "Tentō Chū no Ki (Ni)" (Japanese: てんとう虫の木 2)	Kenjirou Okada	Mamoru Kurosawa	November 4, 2017
26	4	"Ladybug Bush (Part 3)"; Transliteration: "Tentō Chū no Ki (San)" (Japanese: てんとう虫の木 3)	Kenjirou Okada	Mamoru Kurosawa	November 4, 2017
26	4	"Feelings"; Transliteration: "Omoi" (Japanese: 想い)	Kenjirou Okada	Mamoru Kurosawa	November 4, 2017
In the past, Hinata's classmate Chiho Sakura was being mistreated by her friends, yet only Hinata stayed by her side. Chiho started to skip school after her bookbag went missing and one of her shoes was flushed down the toilet. Hinata and Chiho tearfully said their goodbyes when the latter was transferring to another school. During physical education class, Hinata pounced on female classmate Megumi Takagi for mocking Chiho's departure. Hinata later realized that one of her sneakers has gone missing, and she was forced to wear one of her school slippers on her way home. In the present, Rei runs after Hinata at night to the pier. Hinata finally understands that she was the next target for trying to protect Chiho. As Hinata remains strong-willed, Rei vows to stay by her side. The next day, Hinata takes Rei to the public library, where Hinata researches dessert ideas while Rei reads more about the silverthorn and the Asian ladybeetle. Rei watches Hinata cry when an Asian ladybeetle flies away outside. At night, Rei, Akari, Hinata, Momo and Someji have dinner together. Someji encourages Hinata to be proud of protecting Chiho. Rei tries to figure out a way to help Hinata.
27	5	"Feelings (Continued)"; Transliteration: "Omoi (Shōzen)" (Japanese: 想い (承前))	Takakazu Nagatomo	Shouji Saeki	November 11, 2017
27	5	"Confession"; Transliteration: "Kokuhaku" (Japanese: 告白)	Takakazu Nagatomo	Shouji Saeki	November 11, 2017
At school, Rei asks Hayashida for advice on anti-bully measures. However, with countless websites on bullying countermeasures, there is no single solution in each case. Hayashida suggests Rei to patiently listen to Hinata's feelings in regards to her case. After Rei describes Hinata's personality and looks, he admits that Hinata is important to him. Rei drops papers containing brackets of the shogi tournament, and Hayashida finds out how much money is at stake before Rei takes his leave. At the shogi hall, Rei loses a match in the tournament, unable to financially support Hinata in some way. Rei invites Harunobu to his apartment and challenges him to a ten-match showdown in preparation for the Kishō Tournament. The next day, Rei helps Akari carry and prepare groceries for cooking dinner, while Hinata, Momo and Someji spend the day at an amusement park. Akari recalls being unsupportive with and distant from Hinata's bravery. Rei remembers Hinata telling him that she was scared. He felt saved by and indebted to both Hinata and Akari. When Hinata, Momo and Someji come home, Hinata gives Rei a cat plushie that she won at the amusement park.
28	6	"Small World"; Transliteration: "Chīsana Sekai" (Japanese: 小さな世界)	Midori Yoshizawa	Midori Yoshizawa	November 18, 2017
28	6	"Letter"; Transliteration: "Tegami" (Japanese: 手紙)	Midori Yoshizawa	Midori Yoshizawa	November 18, 2017
After bringing cherries to the Kawamoto sisters, Rei plays 8-Piece handicap shogi with Hinata in her bedroom, winning with his gold generals and king. However, during 9-Piece handicap shogi, he struggles to win against Hinata with his right gold general and king. Noticing that Hinata is smiling now, Rei uses this opportunity to ask what has been happening at her school recently. Hinata describes the drowning sensation of laughter during lunchtime from classmates who bullied Chiho. After lunchtime at school, Hinata plays catch with Yūsuke Takahashi, who was previously informed by Rei about Hinata's situation. At the shogi hall, Rei wins his fourth match overall and his second consecutive match in the rank-deciding competition, being eligible for the Kishō, Shishio and Rookie Tournaments. After lunchtime the next day, Takahashi pitches a fastball towards Takagi to scare her off. Takahashi then tells Hinata that Chiho once shared her lunch with him after his lunch fell into the sand. Later in her bedroom, Hinata reveals to Rei that she sent a letter to Chiho, but never got a response. The following day, Hinata arrives at her homeroom classroom, only to find insults about her written on the chalkboard.
29	7	"Start of the Rainy Season"; Transliteration: "Tsuyu no Hajimari" (Japanese: 梅雨の始まり)	Yutaka Kawasaki	Takashi Kawabata	November 25, 2017
29	7	"Hachiya"; Transliteration: "Hachiya" (Japanese: 蜂谷)	Yutaka Kawasaki	Takashi Kawabata	November 25, 2017
Rei brings peaches to Akari, while Hinata lies down on her back after suffering from a nosebleed. Akari then tells Rei that Hinata's homeroom teacher made Hinata furious when being told to be cooperative. As Akari fears that she will also be contacted by the homeroom teacher, she might enlist the help of Someji and Misaki to defuse the situation. As Rei exclaims that he is here for her as well, Akari counts on his support. At night, Harunobu tells Rei that the four-time Rookie King named Junkei Yamazaki will be in the finals. Harunobu then warns Rei about professional shogi player Subaru Hachiya, nicknamed the Irritated Prince of the East. Rei contemplates that he must win at shogi in order to help Hinata and Akari. The next day during the semifinals of the Rookie Tournament at the shogi hall, Rei faces against Hachiya, known for his tongue-clicking amongst other noisy mannerisms. Rei ultimately sacrifices his bishop in order to break Hachiya's defense, causing Hachiya to resign. Smith and Yanagihara finish their match before telling Rei that he thinks the world revolves around him. Hachiya then gives a much unneeded post-match review to Rei at a restaurant.
30	8	"Midday Moon"; Transliteration: "Mahiru no Tsuki" (Japanese: 真昼の月)	Tetsuya Miyanishi (Note: Assisted by Hajime Ootani.)	Mie Ooishi	December 2, 2017
30	8	"Adventurers"; Transliteration: "Bōkensha Tachi" (Japanese: 冒険者たち)	Tetsuya Miyanishi	Mie Ooishi	December 2, 2017
After Rei explains that Hinata's mother is deceased and Hinata's father is living with his new girlfriend, Hayashida believes that he should talk to Hinata's homeroom teacher. On the way home, Hayashida buys Rei a steamed meat bun, though accusing him of being out of step and stubborn. Hayashida advised Rei to take a deep breath and start walking one step at a time. The next day, Rei wins his third match against Ichiro Morita in the Kishō Tournament and will be facing Yamazaki in the finals of the Rookie Tournament. Rei soon learns from Shimada that Harunobu was admitted to the hospital due to his rare illness. In the past, Shimada first met Harunobu during the semifinals of the Children's Shogi Tournament, where Rei happened to win. Hanaoka prepared special meals due to Harunobu's dietary restrictions, while Shimada visited Harunobu in order to encourage him to play even better. In the present, Shimada shows Rei a copy of Harunobu's game records in the semifinals against Yamazaki, which reveals that Harunobu collapsed after 138 moves. After knowing the full extent of Harunobu's rare illness, Rei still plans to play in the finals against Yamazaki for the sake of Harunobu.
31	9	"Kingdom (Part 1)"; Transliteration: "Ōkoku (Ichi)" (Japanese: 王国 1)	Yoshiko Mikami	Kenjirou Okada	December 9, 2017
31	9	"Kingdom (Part 2)"; Transliteration: "Ōkoku (Ni)" (Japanese: 王国 2)	Yoshiko Mikami	Kenjirou Okada	December 9, 2017
Akari serves Rei some pork cutlets for dinner before his big match in the finals of the Rookie Tournament tomorrow. On the other hand, Hinata suffers a stomachache due to stress before her field trip tomorrow to Kyoto for three days. Seeing that Hinata is fighting for her life just as Harunobu has been doing, Rei promises Hinata that he will win and take her out for dessert. In Osaka the next day, Rei passes by the convenience store and overhears two men who ridicule Harunobu's health condition as a way of maintaining Yamazaki's shogi title. Rei arrives at the silent shogi hall in order to face Yamazaki in the finals. During the match, Rei hears Harunobu's voice reminding him to play his own style of shogi. With this in mind, Rei puts aside his own feelings and plays for the sake of those whom he cares about. Rei wins the finals and becomes the new Rookie King. Yokomizo later gives Rei some stomach medicine from Shimada, and Rei travels to Shinkyōgoku Street in search of Hinata. Rei eventually finds Hinata at a nearby riverbank, and she embraces him in tears.
32	10	"Silver Wings"; Transliteration: "Gin no Hane" (Japanese: 銀の羽根)	Takudai Kakuchi	Shouji Saeki	December 16, 2017
32	10	"River Scenery"; Transliteration: "Kawa Keshiki" (Japanese: 川景色)	Takudai Kakuchi	Shouji Saeki	December 16, 2017
Yamazaki reflects that "if you believe and you work hard at it everyday for even an hour longer than all of your rivals, there is a good chance your dream will come true". He became obsessed with shogi and pigeon racing since childhood, but he recently was demoted a class and his favorite pigeon racer Silver never returned after the latest spring race. After six years of becoming a professional shogi player, Yamazaki was at a standstill, while Rei and Harunobu continued to press on. Yamazaki remembers playing in the semifinals against Harunobu, who had a strong will before his collapse. Silver returns to Yamazaki in his cottage, while Hanaoka gives Harunobu a flower bouquet in the hospital. At the wagashi shop, Rei treats the Kawamoto family to dessert. Akari and Hinata end up overeating, much to the surprise of Rei and Someji. Rei carries Momo home with Hinata in order to use the restroom. A flashback reveals Hinata telling Akari, Momo and Someji that Rei came all the way to see her at the riverbank in Kyoto, where he gave her the stomach medicine, fed her some pudding and told her that he won the Rookie Tournament.
33	11	"Where the Sun Shines"; Transliteration: "Hi no Ataru Basho" (Japanese: 陽のあたる場所)	Midori Yoshizawa	Takashi Kawabata	December 23, 2017
33	11	"Small World"; Transliteration: "Chīsana Sekai" (Japanese: 小さな世界)	Midori Yoshizawa	Takashi Kawabata	December 23, 2017
Yanagihara and Jingūji offer Rei a Commemorative Match against Sōya, something that Shimada would not be fit to represent. The next day, the After School Shogi Science Club congratulate Rei as the new Rookie King. Noguchi celebrates with homemade ginger ale, Caspian Sea yogurt, nattō with rice flour dumplings, plum jam and ramune candy. Hayashida expresses his enthusiasm when he found out that Rei won the Rookie Tournament. Overwhelmed with tears, Rei goes to the restroom with the realization that so many people are rooting for him. He later goes to the shopping district and purchases a diary. Meanwhile, Smith and Yokomizo discuss how Issa was brainwashed by professional shogi player Gakuto Sakurai through mountaineering therapy. During the Kishō Championship Semifinals, Shimada is able to win against Sakurai in a tough match. While trying to make straw sandals, Noguchi reveals that he will be leaving after summer to focus on university exams, much to Rei's dismay. Noguchi then tells Hayashida that disappointment and loneliness can be essential in order to interact with the world. Hayashida and Noguchi encourage Rei to recruit more members into the Shogi Club, eventually convincing the principal and the vice principal to join.
34	12	"Black Mist"; Transliteration: "Kuroi Kiri" (Japanese: 黒い霧)	Hajime Ootani	Hajime Ootani	January 6, 2018
34	12	"Light"; Transliteration: "Hikari" (Japanese: 光)	Hajime Ootani	Hajime Ootani	January 6, 2018
Hinata finds her homeroom teacher's missing timeline hidden in the social studies classroom. Takagi calls Hinata a brownnoser under her breath, prompting Hinata to confront Takagi. However, Hinata's homeroom teacher collapses after being troubled by bullying classmates, ultimately being hospitalized due to stress. In the meantime, head teacher Kokobu will be taking over the homeroom classroom, personally speaking with the students individually after class to resolve conflict before summer vacation begins. Afterwards, Akari takes Hinata to the pier in order to eat French toast in a cup and beef croquettes. Akari later tells Someji that she will attend the school conference tomorrow with Hinata. The next day at school, Takagi's mother and Akari start an argument about a false accusation concerning Takagi and no proof on Hinata's account. Hinata takes a bewildered Akari to the school infirmary, while Kokobu returns to start the school conference in the faculty room with Takagi and her mother. As Hinata vows to Akari that she will never to be silent again, Kokobu tells Takagi's mother that Hinata being bullied is the proof. Kokobu arrives at the school infirmary to discuss with Hinata and Akari about what to do next.
35	13	"Small Palm"; Transliteration: "Chīsana Tenohira" (Japanese: 小さな手のひら)	Takakazu Nagatomo	Shouji Saeki	January 13, 2018
35	13	"Sunny Place"; Transliteration: "Hinata" (Japanese: 日向)	Takakazu Nagatomo	Shouji Saeki	January 13, 2018
Despite her apology, Takagi rambles on about people's expectations of her to Kokobu, but Takagi is pointed out by Kokobu what part of that has anything to do with Chiho and Hinata which is absolutely nothing; Takagi is a sociopath who has no compassion or empathy (with the possibility she will never be sorry for the people she hurts for the rest of her life). Hinata recalls that Kokobu removed Takagi and her clique from the homeroom classroom the previous week for individual interrogation of suspected bullying. Hinata later receives a letter from Chiho, who details her new rural life studying at the Heart Care Center. Chiho further explains that her father's office is close to the center, and her teacher Sato taught her how to make friends. She writes for Hinata to visit her during summer vacation in order to have plum syrup and corn together. Afterwards, Shimada gives Rei bags of summer oranges, and Rei visits Hinata. After waiting for Hinata to wake up, Rei notices a glowing aura around her, in which she admits that the bullying is over. At the pier, Hinata tells Rei that four female bullies apologized to her and baked cookies with her. Rei apologizes for not being there to protect Hinata, but she makes him realize that he was always there for her regardless. As they start to walk together, she tells him about her letter from Chiho, and Rei personally makes an oath of loyalty.
36	14	"Flowing Away"; Transliteration: "Nagarete Iku Mono" (Japanese: 流れていくもの)	Tetsuya Miyanishi	Mie Ooishi	January 20, 2018
36	14	"White Storm (Part 1)"; Transliteration: "Shiroi Arashi (Ichi)" (Japanese: 白い嵐 1)	Tetsuya Miyanishi	Mie Ooishi	January 20, 2018
Shimada and Yanagihara are awestruck at the professional promotional poster featuring the Commemorative Match between Sōya and Rei, compared to the unprofessional promotional poster featuring the Kishō Championship Finals between Shimada and Yanagihara. Jingūji reminds Shimada and Yanagihara of their lousy health and appalling first match, in which Shimada ended up losing. Meanwhile, Rei confirms to Hayashida that he is nervous about the Commemorative Match in Morioka, while Hayashida figures out the conversation that Rei and Hinata previously had at the pier ever since her situation was resolved. Rei then takes a bullet train to Morioka, where Jingūji takes Rei to his spacious hotel room with a view of Gosho Lake. With nothing to do until the reception in the evening, Rei takes a hot bath in his bathroom instead of going to the local hot spring. During the reception, Rei soon realizes that this will be his first match against Sōya. When red wine is accidentally spilled onto Sōya's suit and tie, Sōya calmly tells the journalists that he will do his best to have a great match against Rei. The next morning, Sōya dons traditional Japanese clothes in preparation for the Commemorative Match.
37	15	"White Storm (Part 2)"; Transliteration: "Shiroi Arashi (Ni)" (Japanese: 白い嵐 2)	Yoshiko Mikami	Shouji Saeki	January 27, 2018
37	15	"White Storm (Part 3)"; Transliteration: "Shiroi Arashi (San)" (Japanese: 白い嵐 3)	Yoshiko Mikami	Shouji Saeki	January 27, 2018
37	15	"White Storm (Part 4)"; Transliteration: "Shiroi Arashi (Yon)" (Japanese: 白い嵐 4)	Yoshiko Mikami	Shouji Saeki	January 27, 2018
Rei compares Sōya to a long-winged white bird that wandered into Rei's backyard during childhood. Moreover, Sōya is borrowing a white kimono from professional shogi player Meiyo Tono, who is from Morioka. At the start of the Commemorative Match, Rei and Sōya create a Double Fortress, but Rei makes a crucial move with his pawn against Sōya's bishop that changes the course of the match. Rei manages to protect his king until he makes a mistake with his pawn and loses. The next day, as Rei boards the bullet train, he wonders why Sōya is so different from the other professional shogi players. Three journalists discuss that Rei played his silver general instead of his pawn while Sōya nodded in confirmation during their post-match review. Due to rising water levels in the Abukuma River from the approaching typhoon in the Japanese archipelago, the bullet train suspends its service for the day. Rei brings Sōya to the train station in Sendai, where Rei gets a refund and exchange at the train ticket window. After making reservations for two single hotel rooms at Seisen Inn, the two stop by the convenience store in the rain before reaching the inn.
38	16	"White Storm (Part 4, Continued)"; Transliteration: "Shiroi Arashi (Yon, Shōzen)" (Japanese: 白い嵐 4 (承前))	Yutaka Kawasaki	Shouji Saeki	February 3, 2018
38	16	"White Storm (Part 5)"; Transliteration: "Shiroi Arashi (Go)" (Japanese: 白い嵐 5)	Yutaka Kawasaki	Shouji Saeki	February 3, 2018
38	16	"Restart"; Transliteration: "Saishidō" (Japanese: 再始動)	Yutaka Kawasaki	Shouji Saeki	February 3, 2018
Rei noticed that Sōya quietly followed him on the way to Seisen Inn. At night, Jingūji contacts Rei, relieved that Rei and Sōya found a hotel near the train station. Jingūji informs Rei that Sōya has suffered intermittent hearing loss since ten years ago, which has affected Sōya's public image. Rei wakes up the next morning, finding out that Sōya already paid the lodging. Later at school, Rei has the ringing sound of the shogi pieces being placed on the shogi board stuck in his head. At night in the shogi hall, Rei makes copies of Sōya's past game records. Meanwhile, Hinata receives a text message from Rei, saying that he has to prepare for a match tomorrow. The Kawamoto sisters are excited that they have prepared soft-boiled eggs with braised pork filling, but are saddened that Rei is unable to come for dinner. The following day, Shimada encounters Rei on the way to the shogi hall studying Sōya's past game records. Shimada tells Rei to visit Harunobu, who has been recently discharged from the hospital. Harunobu wins a match using a Tempo Loss Bishop Exchange against professional shogi player Aono. Rei is glad to see Harunobu alive and well.
39	17	"Burnt Field (Part 1)"; Transliteration: "Yakenogahara (Ichi)" (Japanese: 焼野が原 1)	Takudai Kakuchi	Mie Ooishi	March 3, 2018 (Note: Episode 17 of the second season was delayed by 3 weeks due to NHK's broadcast of the 2018 Winter Olympics.)
39	17	"Burnt Field (Part 2)"; Transliteration: "Yakenogahara (Ni)" (Japanese: 焼野が原 2)	Takudai Kakuchi	Mie Ooishi	March 3, 2018
Rei, Harunobu and Shimada are disgusted by the plain promotional poster featuring the Kishō Championship Finals between Shimada and Yanagihara with Rei and Harunobu as cocommentators. It is shown that Jingūji planned to showcase the feebleness of Shimada and Yanagihara due to budget cuts. During the reception at the inn venue, Rei, Harunobu and Shimada witness Yanagihara being extra friendly with the spectators. With two matches each won so far, Shimada contemplates that the fifth match of the Kishō Championship Finals is his opportunity to dethrone Yanagihara from his title. Meanwhile, Yanagihara talks with journalist Gan, who is terrified of retiring because he feels like he is in a burnt field. Yanagihara feels burdened with sashes, fighting to maintain his title in honor of his friends who have quit being professional shogi players. The next morning, Yanagihara wakes up and takes various medicines. When the match begins, Yanagihara plays an edge pawn by his third move and does a Bishop Exchange Fourth File Rook by his fifth move. As the match enters the final stage, Shimada plays a gold general in order to gain an advantage. Yanagihara refuses to let go of his burning desire to quit.
40	18	"Burnt Field (Part 3)"; Transliteration: "Yakenogahara (San)" (Japanese: 焼野が原 3)	Hajime Ootani	Takashi Kawabata	March 10, 2018
40	18	"Burnt Field (Part 4)"; Transliteration: "Yakenogahara (Yon)" (Japanese: 焼野が原 4)	Hajime Ootani	Takashi Kawabata	March 10, 2018
Yanagihara plays a silver general against Shimada in order to set up his lance, in which Shimada defends with his bishop. After comparing Shimada to the growth of a Japanese zelkova, Yanagihara is unable to compare himself to anything. Shimada plays a gold general, and Yanagihara loses concentration. As the figurative sashes drift away from his body, Yanagihara still struggles to grasp them. Yanagihara riskily plays the king, and Shimada plays a promoted bishop in response. However, Yanagihara ultimately wins the match after 169 moves and earns the title of Eternal Kishō after being a ten-time undefeated champion. Yanagihara has Gan take a commemorative photo with Rei, Harunobu, Shimada, Jingūji and the rest of the spectators, who all showed their support to Yanagihara. As Yanagihara treasures this moment, he burns the figurative sashes and finally lets go of his burden. Yanagihara later tells Jingūji that he is concerned about next year's tournament at his old age.
41	19	"Being Here"; Transliteration: "Koko ni iru Koto" (Japanese: ここにいること)	Noriko Hashimoto	Shouji Saeki	March 17, 2018
41	19	"Summer Vacation (Part 1)"; Transliteration: "Natsuyasumi (Ichi)" (Japanese: 夏休み 1)	Noriko Hashimoto	Shouji Saeki	March 17, 2018
The Kawamoto sisters try a new recipe for "chilled syrup flour dumplings" with different flavors. Someji approves after trying a sample. As soon as summer vacation starts, Akari and Hinata visit Chiho at her ranch. Chiho still struggles to maintain her mental and physical health due to the painful memories that she endured at Hinata's middle school. When Akari and Hinata return home, they sell chilled syrup flour dumplings at the wagashi shop during the summer festival. Rei, who assists with cleaning the bowls and towels at the wagashi shop, is surprised when Takahashi stops by. In the evening, the dumplings run low after they sell like hot cakes, but Someji sternly tells Akari, Hinata and Rei how they can quickly make some more. The next day, Someji tells Akari and Hinata that they achieved a net profit despite their struggles in sales. Meanwhile, Kokobu assigns young teacher Komigawa as the new homeroom teacher for three days, but Komigawa expresses how Takagi's mother is hardheaded over the fact that Takagi is a bully. Kokobu talks with Takagi about making an effort, and he concludes that she has anxiety. At night, Akari finds a sleeping Hinata and her sketches of sweets.
42	20	"Summer Vacation (Part 2)"; Transliteration: "Natsuyasumi (Ni)" (Japanese: 夏休み 2)	Yutaka Kawasaki; Tetsuya Miyanishi	Mie Ooishi	March 24, 2018
42	20	"New Year"; Transliteration: "Atarashī Toshi" (Japanese: あたらしい年)	Yutaka Kawasaki; Tetsuya Miyanishi	Mie Ooishi	March 24, 2018
Rei is astounded by Hinata's sketches of sweets filled with innovative ideas, but she has homework to focus on for the summer. He reveals that he wanted to be a professional shogi player since he was in fourth grade. Hinata worries about attending high school next year, even though she wants to help out at the wagashi shop. Rei, Hinata and Momo meet with Noguchi at his backyard. Hayashida comes with a plate of flume noodles. When Akari arrives with chicken tempura, Hayashida develops a crush. Noguchi plays a game with the flume noodles on the flume of bamboo, in which those marked pink will get chicken tempura and those marked green will get nothing. Early January of the following year, Hinata studies for the high school entrance exams. Rei tutors Hinata after learning that she plans to attend his high school. Akari pampers Rei and Hinata with fried tofu and shrimp tempura. Hinata contemplates about Someji's finances at the wagashi shop if she attends Rei's high school. Despite the fact that the acceptance rate is low, Hinata is still determined to attend Rei's high school. Hinata looks out her bedroom window and sees the first snowfall of the year.
43	21	"Passing Time"; Transliteration: "Heru Toki" (Japanese: 経る時)	Yoshiko Mikami	Shouji Saeki	March 31, 2018 (Note: Episodes 21 and 22 of the second season aired consecutively on March 31, 2018.)
43	21	"Spring Comes"; Transliteration: "Harugakuru" (Japanese: 春が来る)	Yoshiko Mikami	Shouji Saeki	March 31, 2018
While getting a checkup from his doctor, Someji admits that he wishes to stay alive until all three of his granddaughters are married. Hinata has five more days until the entrance exams on Friday, February 13th. Rei startles Hinata with news that Takahashi got accepted into a private school in Shikoku because of a recommendation, leading Rei to regret his words. Hinata starts to think about Takahashi as she visits the town for the next few days. On the night before the high school entrance exams, Rei stays overnight when Hinata comes down with a fever. On the day of the entrance exams, Hinata recovers from her fever and she walks to school with Rei. Akari and Someji each send their blessings. After Hinata passes her high school entrance exams, a celebratory feast is prepared in her honor. A flashback reveals that Misaki was worried about Akari and Someji leaving Rei and Hinata alone overnight. In the present, Rei tells Someji that he has eight wins in the rank-deciding competition and has a chance of moving up a class in the next two matches. Rei believes that Hinata is his newfound light. At the shogi hall, Rei reunites with Masachika.
44	22	"Extra Chapter: The Other House"; Transliteration: "Mō Hitotsu no Ie" (Japanese: もうひとつの家)	Hajime Ootani; Kenjirou Okada	Hajime Ootani	March 31, 2018
44	22	"Child of March Town"; Transliteration: "Sangatsu-chō no Ko" (Japanese: 三月町の子)	Hajime Ootani; Kenjirou Okada	Hajime Ootani	March 31, 2018
Rei visits Masachika's wife at her house, finding out that Ayumu is going to a prep school while Kyōko is a temp worker. Masachika's wife notices that Rei is mellow as a professional shogi player. Rei's good behavior in the past eventually led Masachika's wife and her children to push Rei away until he left the household. Masachika's wife once had a strange dream, in which Rei was her own child much like Ayumu and Kyōko. Later on, Rei invites Hinata and Takahashi to a monjayaki place before Takahashi leaves for Shikoku. After congratulating Rei on his recent promotion up a class, Takahashi plans to make it in the kōshien baseball tournaments. Hinata is saddened that Takahashi is departing next Saturday, which is the day of the cherry blossom festival. On the morning of the cherry blossom festival, Akari and Hinata sell sweet red bean soup with rice dumplings outside the wagashi shop. Hinata later decides to get a bob cut, though she is not too fond of it. Despite Akari's positive feedback, Someji and Momo lower Hinata's self-esteem even more. When Rei arrives to take Hinata to school, he is really fascinated with her bob cut.
