= Moonchild (Japanese group) =

Japanese girl group

Moonchild ムーンチャイルド
- Genre: J-pop
- Years active: 2023–2024
- Labels: LDH Japan; Sony Music Japan; CDL entertainment
- Past members: Ruan; Uwa; Anri; Hana; Mirano
- Website: www.sonymusic.co.jp/artist/moonchild/

Moonchild (Japanese: ムーンチャイルド; stylized in all caps) was a Japanese girl group formed by LDH Japan and signed to the sub-label CDL Entertainment which was founded by Hiroomi Tosaka. The group was composed of five members: Ruan, Uwa, Anri, Hana, and Mirano. Moonchild was formed through LDH's audition program iCON Z ~Dreams For Children~. Tosaka served as their head producer while music was produced by ALYSA from Hybe Labels Japan. The group released their debut single "Don't Blow It" on April 24, 2023, and officially debuted with their first extended play Delicious Poison on May 3, 2023.

== Name ==
The group name MOONCHILD was chosen to express the concept of the group as bewitching, ephemeral and ever-changing like the moon.

== Career ==
=== 2021–2022: Formation through iCON Z ~Dreams For Children~ ===
Moonchild was formed through LDH Japan's audition program iCON Z ~Dreams For Children~. Out of 48,000 people, only 30 girls passed for the second screening of the girl group category. On September 25, 2022, the final episode of the girls division aired and the successful candidates who were able to become members of the final group were announced.

=== 2023–2024: Debut with Delicious Poison and disbandment ===
On March 6, 2023, the group released three pre-release digital singles. On April 2, a debut teaser announcing the group's first EP Delicious Poison was released. The album was released on May 3, 2023. On May 8, they held a debut showcase at Toyosu PIT in Tokyo, which was live streamed for free on their YouTube channel and the platform ABEMA (K WORLD channel).

On May 22, they appeared on the cover of VI/NYL issue #011, their first magazine cover. On May 23, the group made their first appearance on the cover of the July special issue of GINGER.

On June 10 and 11, they attended the 2023 Weverse Con Festival at KSPO Dome in Seoul, South Korea.

On April 24, 2024, LDH announced after discussions with the members and their families, Moonchild will end their activities in April. Anri and Mirano would be staying at LDH and working towards a new music and entertainment activities, Uwa and Hana would leave the company and pursue dance and education respectively while Ruan would become a producer.

== Members ==
- Ruan (ルアン)
- Uwa (ウワ)
- Anri (アンリ)
- Hana (ハナ)
- Mirano (みらの)

== Discography ==
=== Extended plays ===
List of extended plays, showing selected details, selected chart positions, and sales figures
Title	Details	Peak chart positions		Sales
Title	Details	JPN	JPN Hot	Sales
Delicious Poison	Released: May 3, 2023; Label: Sony Music Japan; Formats: CD, digital download, streaming; Track listing: 1. Don't Blow It!; 2. "Photogenic"; 3. "Chili Chocolate"; 4. "One Bite"; 5. "Skydive"; 6. "Bzz Bzz"; 7. "Lonely"	9	8	JPN: 5,718 (Phy.); JPN: 205 (Dig.)
Friends Are For	Released: November 29, 2023; Label: Sony Music Japan; Formats: CD, digital download, streaming	23	27	JPN: 2,636

=== Singles ===
Title	Year	Album
"Chili Chocolate"	2023	Delicious Poison
"One Bite"	2023	Delicious Poison
"Lonely"	2023	Delicious Poison
"Don't Blow It!"	2023	Delicious Poison

== Concert and tours ==
=== Concert participation ===
- 2023 Weverse Con Festival
