= Ruann =

Japanese singer (born 2003)

Ruann 大山琉杏
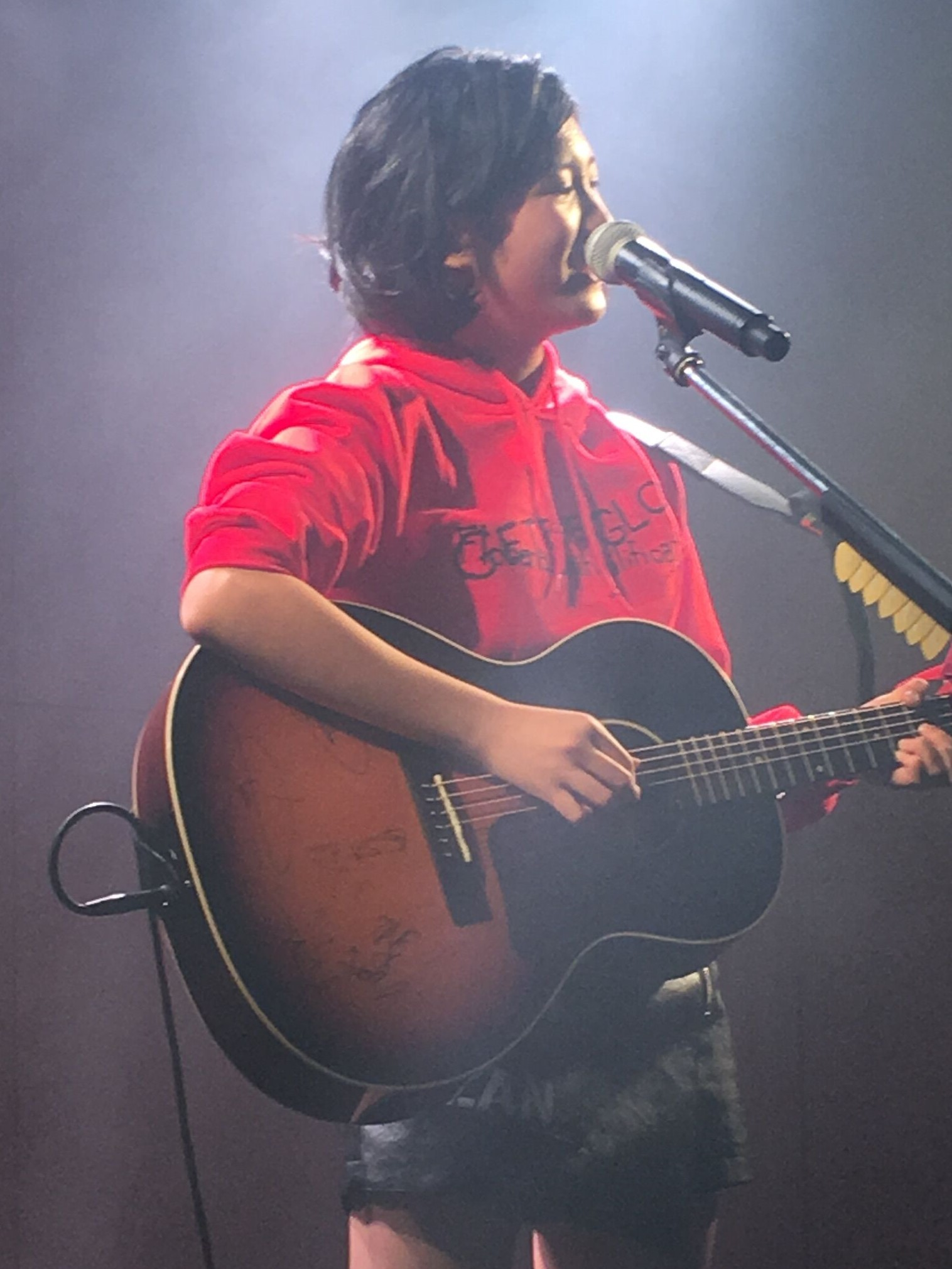
- Ruan performing at Omotesandō Wall & Wall in 2018

Background information
- Born: Ruan Ohyama; July 21, 2003 (age 23)
- Origin: Osaka Prefecture
- Genres: J-Pop; K-Pop
- Occupations: Singer; Songwriter
- Instruments: Vocals; Guitar
- Years active: 2017–present
- Labels: LDH; CDL
- Formerly of: Moonchild

Japanese name
- Kanji: 大山 琉杏
- Hiragana: おおやま るあん
- Katakana: オオヤマ ルアン
Transcriptions
- Romanization: Ōyama Ruan

Korean stage name
- Hangul: 루안
- RR: Ruan
- MR: Ruan

Ruan Ohyama (大山 琉杏, Ōyama Ruan; born July 21, 2003), known professionally as Ruan (stylized as RUANN) is a Japanese singer. She is a former member of the Japanese girl group Moonchild.

== Biography ==
Ruann was born in Osaka Prefecture in 2003. Interested in music from a young age, Ruann taught herself instruments such as acoustic guitar, piano as well as Korean and English through learning apps. Her early exposures to the world of entertainment included an appearance on Kanjani no Shiwake 8, where she covered Lady Gaga's "Telephone" in 2013, and when she was chosen to sing the theme song for the kabuki adaptation of the manga One Piece, Super Kabuki II: One Piece, "Tetote", a composition written by Yujin Kitagawa of the Japanese band Yuzu. Ruann uploaded videos on social media of covers and busking performances. One of these performances was seen by Taka, the vocalist of the band One Ok Rock, who asked Ruann to perform their song "Wherever You Are" as a special guest during their 2017 Ambitions tour. In summer 2017, she released her first extended play Spice 13 Acoustic EP.

Her first release as Ruann was "Get the Glory", a digital single released in January 2018 used to promote Cygames, followed by "I Am Standing", a song used as the ending theme song for the anime March Comes in Like a Lion. In August, Ruann announced her major label debut through Toy's Factory. Her single "There's No Ending", used as the theme song for the film Anemone: Psalm of Planets Eureka Seven: Hi-Evolution (2018), was her most successful release to date, and her first release to chart on a Billboard Japan subchart.

In March 2019, Ruann's official website announced that she was taking a hiatus due to poor health. In June, Ruann tweeted that her contract with Toy's Factory had ended, and in July announced that she would make her debut in Korea with the song "Beep Beep", which was released simultaneously in Japan and Korea. Korean production team Black Eyed Pilseung produced the song, while the music video featured a routine produced by choreographer Lia Kim.

Following issues with the copyright ownership of her stage name, Ruann stopped posting in July 2020. In October, all of her social media accounts were cleared of content. Her social media accounts and her official website were deleted on October 31, 2020.

After over a year of absence from the entertainment industry, Ruann reappeared in January 2022 as one of the trainees on LDH's audition program iCON-Z under her birth name, Ohyama Ruan. She finished in third place, thus becoming a member of Moonchild.

On April 24 2024, LDH announced after discussions with the members that Moonchild will end their activities in April with Ruan becoming a producer at LDH.

== Artistry ==
Ruann's influences include Michael Jackson, Lady Gaga and Taylor Swift. She composes music on the guitar.

== Discography ==
=== Extended plays ===
Title	Album details
Spice 13 Acoustic EP (as Ruan Ohyama)	Released: June 14, 2017; Label: Shimoki Ruanta; Formats: Digital download
Scramble 14	Released: March 6, 2018; Label: Shimoki Ruanta; Formats: CD

=== Singles ===
List of singles, with selected chart positions
Title	Year	Peak chart positions	Album
Title	Year	JPN Hot 100 Digi	Album
"Tetote" (as Ruan)	2015	—	Non-album single
"Get the Glory"	2018	—	Scramble 14
"I Am Standing"	2018	—	Scramble 14
"Love & Hope"	2018	—	Non-album single
"There's No Ending"	2018	37	Anemone / Eureka Seven Hi-Evolution Original Soundtrack CD
"Beep Beep"	2019	—	Non-album single
"—" denotes items that did not chart.

=== Promotional singles ===
Title	Year	Album
"Problem" (as Ruan Ohyama)	2017	Non-album singles
"Ready to Go"	2018	Non-album singles
”Phantom"	2020	Non-album singles
