= Depapepe =

Japanese music group

DEPAPEPE
- Origin: Kobe, Hyōgo, Japan
- Genres: Acoustic music, instrumental music
- Years active: 2002-present
- Labels: Sony Music
- Members: Miura "Depa" Takuya; Tokuoka "Pepe" Yoshinari
- Website: Official site

Depapepe (デパペペ) is a music group originating from Japan. The acoustic guitar duo is composed of Takuya Miura (born 5 April 1983) and Yoshinari Tokuoka (born on 15 July 1977), who formed in 2002.

They made their major debut in 2005 with their album "Let's Go!!!", which generated sales figures of about 100,000 and ranked within the top 10 of Oricon's Instrumental Artist Debut Chart. Before that, they had released three indie albums.

The name itself comes from the combination of both short names of the band members, by combining the Japanese word for overbite, 'deppa', and the name of Tokuoka's previous band 'DERUPEPE'. Contrary to a popular rumour circulating among their fans, the two guitarists are not brothers. In their 2002 formation the pair joined with the Sony Music. They worked on insert songs for anime television series Honey and Clover.

== Members ==
- Miura Takuya (三浦拓也) - Depa (Born: Kobe, 5 April 1983)
- Tokuoka Yoshinari (徳岡慶也) - Pepe (Born: Kobe, 15 July 1977)

== Discography ==
=== Indie ===
- ACOUSTIC FRIENDS (5 February 2004)
  1. Hi-D!!
  2. La tanta
  3. 真夜中の怪盗 Thief of Midnight
  4. 水面に浮かぶ金魚鉢 Goldfish Bowl Floating on the Water
  5. 風 Wind
  6. いつかみた道 The Road Seen Someday
  7. 木漏れ陽の中で In the Sunshine Shining Through the Trees
  8. THIS WAY
- Sky! Sky! Sky! (15 July 2004)
  1. Sky! Sky! Sky!
  2. Sabamba
  3. さざなみ Ripple
  4. TIME
  5. 微風 Breeze
- PASSION OF GRADATION (2 December 2004)
  1. 激情メランコリック Passion Melancholic
  2. DUNK
  3. FRIENDS
  4. Snow Dance
  5. ありがとう。 Thank You.
  6. Fun Time

=== Single ===
- SUMMER PARADE (20 July 2005)
  1. SUMMER PARADE
  2. B.B.D
  3. オールド・ビーチ Old Beach
  4. 星の数だけ願いは届く Reach Many Wishes as the Number of the Stars
- Spur - WINTER VERSION'05/Swingin' Happy X'mas (シュプール －WINTER VERSION'05/Swingin' Happy X'mas) (30 November 2005)
  1. Spur - WINTER VERSION'05 (シュプール -WINTER VERSION '05)
  2. Swingin' Happy X'mas
- Lahaina (ラハイナ) (15 March 2006)
  1. ラハイナ Lahaina
  2. きっとまたいつか Surely Some Other Day
  3. JAC(K) IN THE BOX
- Night & Day: DEPAPEPE meets Honey and Clover (ハチミツとクローバー) (11 October 2006)
  1. Night & Day
  2. パステル通り Pastel Toori (Pastel Street)
  3. ハチロク Hachi Roku
  4. 光ノサキへ Hikari no Saki he (Beyond the Light)
- Sakura Kaze (桜風) (21 February 2007)
  1. 桜風 Sakura Wind
  2. DAYS
  3. Happy Shine
- KATANA (22 April 2009)
  1. KATANA
  2. KATANA staging Diggy-MO'
  3. HighRock!!
  4. 雨音 Rain Sound

=== Mini album ===
- Hi！Mode！！ (19 October 2005)
  1. 哀愁バイオレット Sorrow Violet
  2. 夕焼けサイクリング Sunset Cycling
  3. Harvest
  4. Tiger
  5. 半月 Half Moon
  6. シュプール Ski Trace
  7. Morning Smile

=== Albums ===
- Let's Go!!! (18 May 2005)
  1. Hi-D!!!
  2. START
  3. Wake Up!
  4. MTMM
  5. バタフライ Butterfly
  6. 風見鶏 Weathercock
  7. 時計じかけのカーニバル Clockwork Carnival
  8. 雨上がり After the Rain
  9. Wedding Bell
  10. Over the Sea
  11. いい日だったね。 It was a Good Day.
  12. FLOW
- Ciao! Bravo!! (19 April 2006)
  1. キミドリ Yellowish green
  2. ラハイナ Lahaina
  3. Judgement
  4. SLOW SUNSET
  5. 寝待ちの月 Moon's Bedtime Waiting
  6. さくら舞う Sakura Dancing
  7. 伯爵の恋 Count's Love
  8. 青春カムバック Youth Comeback
  9. きっとまたいつか (album version) Surely Some Other Day
  10. ブラボー・マーチ Bravo March
  11. SUNSHINE SURF!!
  12. T.M.G.
  13. ラハイナ (mahalo version)
- BEGINNING OF THE ROAD ～collection of early songs～ (25 April 2007)
  1. 風 '07 ver. Wind
  2. La tanta cha cha cha ver.
  3. Sky! Sky! Sky! '07 ver.
  4. さざなみ splash ver. Ripple
  5. 木漏れ陽の中で brilliant ver. In the Sunshine Shining Through the Trees
  6. 真夜中の怪盗 失われた秘宝の謎 Thief of Midnight Mystery of the Lost Treasures
  7. 激情メランコリック 情熱MIX Passion Melancholic Passion MIX
  8. いつかみた道 '07 ver. The Road Seen Someday
  9. DUNK studio session
  10. Snow Dance winter session
  11. THIS WAY B.O.R. ver.
  12. ありがとう。 for you ver. Thank you.
  13. SINGING BIRD
- デパクラ (DEPACLA) ～DEPAPEPE PLAYS THE CLASSICS～ (28 November 2007)
  1. パッヘルベルのカノン Pachelbel's Canon in D
  2. 2声のインヴェンション第4番 Bach's Invention No. 4
  3. G線上のアリア Bach's Air on G String
  4. ピアノソナタ第8番 ハ短調 作品13 "悲愴"第2楽章 Beethoven's Piano Sonata No. 8 in C minor, op. 13 "Pathetique"
  5. ジムノぺディ第1番 Satie's Gymnopedie No. 1
  6. ボレロ Ravel's Bolero
- HOP! SKIP! JUMP! (2 April 2008)
  1. FESTA!!
  2. Ready! GO!!
  3. Great Escape
  4. 禁じられた恋 Forbidden Love
  5. Horizon
  6. 旅の空から、 The Journey from the Sky,
  7. Marine Drive
  8. ROSY
  9. a ボトム A Bottom
  10. VIVA! JUMP!
  11. GIGIO^{2}
  12. 桜風 Sakura Wind
- デパナツ (DEPANATSU) ～drive!drive!!drive!!!～ (30 July 2008)
  1. ラハイナ（CW version） Lahaina
  2. Sky! Sky! Sky!
  3. Over the Sea
  4. FLOW
  5. SUMMER PARADE
  6. SLOW SUNSET
  7. Happy Shine
  8. 光ノサキへ Beyond the Light
  9. さざなみ splash ver. Ripple
  10. SUNSHINE SURF!!（CW version）
  11. 星の数だけ願いは届く Reach Many Wishes as the Number of the Stars
  12. ひと夏の恋 Summer Romance
  13. Sky! Sky! Sky! '07 ver.
- デパフユ(DEPAFUYU)～ 晴れ 時どき 雪～ (26 November 2008)
  1. シュプール -WINTER VERSION '05
  2. Night & Day
  3. 夕焼けサイクリング Sunset Cycling
  4. Snow Dance winter session
  5. TIME
  6. Dreams
  7. パステル通り Pastel Street
  8. 散歩道 Promenade
  9. DAYS
  10. Morning Smile
  11. 哀愁バイオレット Sorrow Violet
  12. きっとまたいつか Surely Some Other Day
  13. THIS WAY B.O.R. ver.
  14. 晴れ時どき雪 Clear Sometimes Snowing
- Do! (3 June 2009)
  1. FAKE
  2. KATANA
  3. Sailing
  4. 紫陽花 Hydrangea
  5. HighRock!!
  6. 最後の晩餐 The Last Supper
  7. 二人の写真 Photo of Two Persons
  8. orange
  9. Dolphindance
  10. ジャンボリー Jamboree
  11. PaPaPa
  12. 真夏の疑惑 Doubt of Midsummer
  13. Quarrel
  14. Mint
  15. Special Lady～the wedding anthem～
- デパクラ 2 (DEPACLA 2)～DEPAPEPE PLAYS THE CLASSICS 2～ (2 December 2009)
  1. 交響曲第9番～第4楽章 Beethoven's Symphony No. 9, 4th Mouvement
  2. 行進曲「威風堂々」 Elgar's Pomp and Circumstance March
  3. 結婚行進曲 Mendelssohn's Wedding March
  4. グリーンスリーヴスによる幻想曲 Vaughan Williams's Fantasia on Greensleeves
  5. アダージョ・ト短調 Albinoni's Adagio in G Minor by Giazotto
  6. 亡き王女のためのパヴァーヌ Ravel - Pavane pour une Infante défunte (Pavane for a Dead Princess)
  7. トルコ行進曲 Mozart's Turkish March
  8. 天国と地獄 Offenbach's Orphée aux enfers (Orpheus in the Underworld) or widely known as Can-can dance
  9. 夜想曲第2番 Chopin's Nocturne No. 2 Op.9
  10. 主よ、人の望みの喜びよ Bach's Jesu, Joy of Man's Desiring
- ONE (18 May 2011)
  1. 恋水 Tears of Love
  2. Lion
  3. beautiful wind
  4. ONE
  5. Starry Night
  6. notes for Flora
  7. Route 128
  8. Hello
  9. Wind on the coastline
  10. Pride
  11. -Interlude-
  12. 白い花 White flowers
- Acoustic & Dining (3 October 2012)
  1. UNION
  2. ツバメ
  3. Memories ft.Coba
  4. Three Minutes Cooking
  5. SPARK!
  6. あの橋を渡ろう
  7. Share My World feat.Sin(SINGULAR)
  8. always
  9. 風薫る
  10. Happy Birthday
  11. かがやける日々
- KISS (27 August 2014)
  1. Life is a Journey
  2. Kiss
  3. four
  4. S.E.L.
  5. Light of Hope
  6. Circle of Love
  7. Howl of the Wolf
  8. Leopard
  9. Interlude～ネムル森～Nemr forest
  10. スミレViolet
  11. あの日見た空The sky we saw that day
  12. 青い鳥Blue Bird
  13. Sunburst
  14. かがやける日々
- Colors (12 April 2017)
  1. Color
  2. Letter from the forest
  3. Girl
  4. Diary
  5. Soda
  6. J.D.P.
  7. 小鳥のキャロル
  8. 旅立ちの日
  9. Reflection
  10. My hometown

=== DEPAPEKO (押尾コータロー×DEPAPEPE) ===
- PICK POP! ～J-Hits Acoustic Covers～ (19 September 2018)
  1. チョコレイト・ディスコ Chocolate Disco (Perfume)
  2. 恋 Koi (Love) (Gen Hoshino)
  3. Gee (Girls' Generation)
  4. 夢芝居 Dream Theater (梅沢富美男)
  5. Dragon Night (SEKAI NO OWARI)
  6. TECHNOPOLIS (Yellow Magic Orchestra)
  7. 恋するフォーチュンクッキー Koi Suru Fortune Cookie (The Fall-in-Love Fortune Cookie) (AKB48)
  8. ラブ・ストーリーは突然に Love Stories Are Sudden (Kazumasa Oda)
  9. ひとり Hitori (Gospellers)
  10. START (DEPAPEPE)
  11. 翼 ～you are the HERO～ (Kotaro Oshio)
  12. For You

== DVD ==
- 6 Color Rainbow - Video Clips Vol. 1 (25 January 2006)
- Ciao! Bravo!! The Movie!!! - DEPAPEPE meets Digital Hollywood (19 July 2006)
- ほろり二人旅 2007 (26 September 2007)
- DEPAPEPEデビュー5年記念ライブ「Merry 5 round」日比谷野外大音楽堂 2009年5月6日 (30 September 2009)
