= Chica Umino =

Japanese manga artist

- Born: August 30, 1965 (age 61) Adachi, Tokyo, Japan
- Areas: Character design, writer, manga artist
- Notable works: Honey and Clover; March Comes In like a Lion
- Awards: Kodansha Manga Award (2003, 2011); Manga Taishō (2011); Tezuka Osamu Cultural Prize – Grand Prize (2014)

Chica Umino (羽海野 チカ, Umino Chika; born August 30, 1965) is the pen name of a pseudonymous Japanese manga artist, designer and illustrator.

Umino is noted for being the author and creator of the Honey and Clover series, for which she received the Kodansha Manga Award in 2003, and which has been adapted into an anime series, produced by J.C.Staff.

== Biography ==
Chica Umino aspired to be a character designer and manga artist since elementary school. In high school, she had one work published in "Bouquet". Her pen name comes from her favorite location Umi no Chikaku no Yuuenchi (海の近くの遊園地, lit. an amusement park by the sea), which is also the title of her doujinshi works prior to her debut. She likes Harry Potter and anime by Hayao Miyazaki. She calls herself an otaku. Western children's books like Anne of Green Gables (for which she drew the cover artwork in a republished version in 2011) she read as a child had a notable influence on her work, especially how she chooses to portray unusual family constellations. Some of Umino's inspirations as an artist comes from the artists Fusako Kuramochi and Moto Hagio, the latter of which she self-taught artistic techniques from.

In 2000, Umino's most notable work, Honey and Clover, began serialization in Takarajimasha's manga magazine Cutie Comic. The series' first fourteen chapters were published in Cutie Comic; serialization was later moved to Shueisha's Young You. With the demise of Young You in 2005, the series moved to the magazine Chorus, where it continued its run until the series ended in July 2006 with 64 chapters. Umino received the 27th Kodansha Manga Award for Honey and Clover in 2003, which was adapted into an anime series produced by J.C. Staff.

Umino's most recent work is March Comes In like a Lion (3月のライオン, Sangatsu no Raion) lit. 'Lion in March" or "March's Lion', which began serialization in Hakusensha's seinen manga magazine, Young Animal. March comes in Like a Lion was inspired by Umino's editor, who suggested that her next work be about shogi or boxing. Because Umino herself did not have any prior experience with shogi, the games depicted in the manga were drawn in partnership with a supervisor.

In 2009, she provided the character designs for original anime series, Eden of the East, by director Kenji Kamiyama.

Umino has also illustrated "Tobira o Akete" and the Glass Heart series, including "Boukensha-tachi", "Netsu no Shiro" and "Love Way."

In 2013, Umino was hospitalized for surgery and medical treatment, and was temporarily suspended from her activities.

== Works ==
=== One-shots ===
- Sora no Kotori
- Hoshi no Opera

=== Manga ===
- Honey and Clover
- March Comes In like a Lion

=== Books ===
- Honey and Clover: Official fan book vol.0
- Honey and Clover Illustrations

=== Character design ===
- Eden of the East
- Fate/Grand Order (Oberon)
