= Honey and Clover =

Japanese manga series

- First tankōbon volume cover (Shueisha edition), featuring Hagumi "Hagu" Hanamoto

ハチミツとクローバー (Hachimitsu to Kurōbā)
- Genre: Coming-of-age; Romance; Slice of life
- Manga
- Written by: Chica Umino
- Published by: Takarajimasha; Shueisha
- English publisher: NA: Viz Media
- Magazine: Cutie Comic (2000–01); Young You (2001–05); Chorus (2005–06)
- English magazine: NA: Shojo Beat
- Original run: April 24, 2000 – July 28, 2006
- Volumes: 10
Further information
Anime television series
Directed by	Ken'ichi Kasai
Written by	Yōsuke Kuroda
Music by	Yuzo Hayashi
Studio	J.C.Staff
Licensed by	AUS: Madman Entertainment; NA: Discotek Media
Original network	Fuji TV (Noitamina)
English network	NA: Neon Alley; SEA: Animax Asia; US: Funimation Channel
Original run	April 15, 2005 – September 30, 2005
Episodes	24 + 2 OVAs
Anime television series
Honey and Clover II
Directed by	Tatsuyuki Nagai
Written by	Yōsuke Kuroda
Music by	Depapepe; Yuzo Hayashi
Studio	J.C.Staff
Licensed by	AUS: Madman Entertainment; NA: Discotek Media
Original network	Fuji TV (Noitamina)
English network	SEA: Animax Asia; US: Funimation Channel
Original run	June 30, 2006 – September 15, 2006
Episodes	12
Live-action film
Directed by	Masahiro Takada
Written by	Masahiro Takada; Masahiko Kawahara
Studio	Asmik Ace Entertainment
Released	July 22, 2006
Runtime	116 minutes
Television drama
Directed by	Masaki Tanamura; Hiroaki Matsuyama
Written by	Shigeki Kaneko
Studio	Fuji Television
Original network	FNS (Fuji TV)
Original run	January 8, 2008 – March 18, 2008
Episodes	11
Television drama
Directed by	Li Yun Chan
Original network	Chinese Television System
Original run	May 25, 2008 – August 31, 2008
Episodes	14
- icon

Honey and Clover (Japanese: ハチミツとクローバー, Hepburn: Hachimitsu to Kurōbā) (Note: Also known as HachiKuro (ハチクロ) and H&C.) is a Japanese manga series written and illustrated by Chica Umino. It was serialized in Takarajimasha's shōjo manga magazine Cutie Comic from 2000 to 2001, before being transferred to Shueisha's josei manga magazine Young You (2001–2005) and later to Chorus (2005–2006); its chapters were collected in ten tankōbon volumes. The series depicts the lives and relationships of a group of art school students who live in the same apartment building.

An anime television series adaptation produced by J.C.Staff was broadcast for two seasons on Fuji TV. The first 24-episode season aired from April to September 2005; the second 12-episode season aired from June to September 2006. It is also the first show to premiere on the Noitamina programming block. The series was also adapted into a live-action film premiered in July 2006, and two separate live-action television dramas in 2008, one broadcast in Japan on Fuji TV from January to March 2008, and the other broadcast in Taiwan on CTS from May to August of the same year.

The Honey and Clover manga has had over 8.5 million copies in circulation. In 2004, the manga won the 27th Kodansha Manga Award in the shōjo category. It also topped the Kono Manga ga Sugoi! list for female readers in 2006 and 2007.

== Plot ==
Yūta Takemoto, Takumi Mayama and Shinobu Morita are three young men who live in the same apartment complex and are students at an art college in Tokyo. One day, they are introduced to Hagumi "Hagu" Hanamoto, the daughter of a cousin of Shūji Hanamoto, an art professor, who has come to live with Hanamoto and has become a first year art student at the art school that everyone attends. Yuta and Shinobu both fall in love with Hagu, but Yuta hides his feelings and tries to be a friend to Hagu while Shinobu expresses his love in ways that seem only to scare Hagu, such as calling her "Mousey" and constantly photographing her. Hagu herself, though initially timid and afraid of company, gradually warms up to the three.

The group comes to include Ayumi Yamada, a master of pottery who is well known by her nickname "Tetsujin" (Iron Lady), who becomes very close to Hagu. When not at school, she helps run the family liquor store. While Ayumi is popular with many young men, she falls in love with Takumi, who does not reciprocate her feelings and considers her a very dear friend. Instead, Takumi pursues an older woman, Rika Harada, a widowed friend of Professor Hanamoto who runs an architecture studio she founded with her late husband. The story follows these five characters in their love triangles, unrequited love, graduating from college, finding jobs, and learning more about themselves.

== Media ==
=== Manga ===
Written and illustrated by Chika Umino, Honey and Clover debuted in Takarajimasha's shōjo manga magazine Cutie Comic on April 24, 2000. (Note: It debuted in the magazine's June issue of 2000, released on April 24 of that same year.) Takarajimasha released a collected volume on January 29, 2001. Cutie Comic ceased publication in 2001, and the series was transferred to Shueisha's josei manga magazine Young You, where it ran from October 6, 2001, to October 8, 2005, when the magazine ceased its publication. It was then transferred to Shueisha's Chorus magazine, where it ran from December 28, 2005, to July 28, 2006. The 64 chapters were collected in ten tankōbon, released from August 19, 2002, to September 8, 2006. A box set collecting the ten volumes was released on May 10, 2007. Two spin-off chapters were published in Chorus on November 28, 2006, and October 28, 2008. All the series' chapters were made available for free on Hakusensha's Young Animal website from August 21 to September 11, 2023.

The manga is licensed in North America by Viz Media, which began serializing it in Shojo Beat magazine in August 2007. Viz Media released the ten volumes from March 4, 2008, to June 1, 2010.

==== Volumes ====
No.	Original release date	Original ISBN	English release date	English ISBN
1	August 19, 2002	4-08-865079-4	March 4, 2008	978-1-4215-1504-5
Chapters 1–9; Umino's Manga Diary; Study Guide
2	August 19, 2002	4-08-865080-8	June 10, 2008	978-1-4215-1505-2
Chapters 10–15; Honey & Clover: The Story So Far; A Little Extra; Story Guide
3	January 17, 2003	4-08-865107-3	September 2, 2008	978-1-4215-1506-9
Chapters 16–21; Bonus Chapter—Pukkun & Milky Tea; A Little Extra; Study Guide
4	February 19, 2003	4-08-865111-1	December 2, 2008	978-1-4215-1507-6
Chapters 22–28; A Little Extra; Study Guide
5	August 19, 2003	4-08-865139-1	March 3, 2009	978-1-4215-2366-8
Chapters 29–34; Challenge Club (Part 1); A Little Extra; Study Guide
6	May 19, 2004	4-08-865203-7	June 2, 2009	978-1-4215-2367-5
Chapters 35–40; Bonus Chapter; Challenge Club (Part 2); A Little Extra; Study Guide
7	March 18, 2005	4-08-865273-8	September 1, 2009	978-1-4215-2368-2
Chapters 41–46; Bonus Chapter - The Legendary Hero Nyanzaburo; A Little Extra; Study Guide
8	July 19, 2005	4-08-865297-5	December 1, 2009	978-1-4215-2380-4
Chapters 47–53; A Little Extra; Study Guide
9	July 14, 2006	4-08-865352-1	March 2, 2010	978-1-4215-2381-1
Chapters 54–60; A Little Extra; Study Guide
10	September 8, 2006	4-08-865358-0	June 1, 2010	978-1-4215-2382-8
Chapters 61–64; Umino and Her Fun Friends; Birds in the Sky; Mini Bonus Episode: Valentine's Day Memory; Bonus Episode; Opera of the Stars; A Little Extra; Study Guide

=== Anime ===
An anime television series adaptation, animated by J.C.Staff, was broadcast for two seasons on Fuji TV's then-new Noitamina block. The first season was directed by Ken'ichi Kasai, and consisted of 24 episodes that aired from April 15 to September 30, 2005, (Note: Fuji TV listed the air dates for the series on Thursday at 24:35, which is effectively Friday at 0:35 a.m. JST.) plus two DVD-only episodes, released on December 14, 2005, and February 24, 2006.

The second season, Honey and Clover II, consists of 12 episodes, aired from June 30 to September 15, 2006. (Note: Fuji TV listed the air dates for the series on Thursday at 24:35, which is effectively Friday at 0:35 a.m. JST.)

The series premiered in Southeast Asia on Animax Asia on August 1, 2006. In North America, the series was licensed by Viz Media. Funimation got the broadcast rights to Viz Media's dub and it premiered on the Funimation Channel on September 19, 2009. Viz Media subsequently released the entire series across three DVD box sets from September 22, 2009, to March 16, 2010. In May 2019, Discotek Media announced the license of the series; both seasons were released on two Blu-ray Disc sets on March 3 and April 28, 2020, respectively. In Australia and New Zealand, the anime was licensed by Madman Entertainment.

==== Music ====
The series' music was composed by Yuzo Hayashi for the first season, and by Depapepe and Hayashi for the second. The first season's soundtrack was released on September 7, 2005. For the first season, the opening theme is "Dramatic" (ドラマチック, Doramachikku), performed by Yuki. The ending theme for the first 12 episodes and episode 24 is "Waltz" (ワルツ, Warutsu), performed by SuneoHair, and the ending theme for episodes 13–23 is "Mistake", performed by The Band Has No Name. The season features insert songs performed by Shikao Suga and Spitz. For the second season, the opening theme is "Fugainaiya" (ふがいないや; "Don't Worry"), performed by Yuki, and the ending theme "Split" (スプリット, Supuritto), performed by Suneohair. Like the first season, the second season also features insert songs performed by Shikao Suga and Spitz.

=== Live-action film ===
The series was adapted into a live-action feature film produced by Asmik Ace Entertainment. It was directed by Masahiro Takada from a screenplay by Masahiko Kawahara and Masahiro Takada, and starred Arashi's Sakurai Sho as Takemoto, Yū Aoi as Hagu, Yūsuke Iseya as Morita, Ryō Kase as Mayama, and Megumi Seki as Ayumi. It was released in Japanese theaters on July 22, 2006. The film was released theatrically in the United States in fall of 2007 by Viz Media. The DVD for the film was released on January 12, 2007. The opening theme song is "Mahō no Kotoba" (魔法のコトバ) by Spitz, while the ending theme song is "Aozora Pedal" (アオゾラペダル) by Arashi.

=== Live-action drama ===
==== Japanese TV drama ====
A 11-episode Japanese television drama adaptation aired on Fuji TV from January 8 to March 18, 2008. Written by Kaneko Shigeki, and directed by Masaki Tanamura and Hiroaki Matsuyama, the show starred Toma Ikuta as Takemoto, Riko Narumi as Hagumi, Hiroki Narimiya as Morita, Osamu Mukai as Mayama, and Natsuki Harada as Ayumi. The music for the series was provided by Shōgo Kaida, Keiichi Miyako (SOPHIA) and Shin Kono, while the theme song is "Canvas", performed by Ken Hirai. A DVD set was released for the series on July 11, 2008.

==== Taiwanese TV drama ====
The manga was adapted into a Taiwanese drama titled (Chinese: 蜂蜜幸運草; pinyin: Feng Mi Xing Yun Cao) starring Lego Lee as An Zhu Ben (Takemoto), Chiaki Ito as Hua Ben Yu (Hagumi), Eddie Peng as Ren Sen Tian (Morita), Joe Cheng as Den Zhen Shan (Mayama), and Janine Chang as He Ya Gong (Ayumi). It was produced by Huang Zhi Ming and directed by Li Yun Chan.

It was broadcast on free-to-air on Chinese Television System (CTS) from May 25 to August 31, 2008.

== Reception ==
The manga has had over 8.5 million copies in circulation.

In 2004, Honey and Clover won the 27th Kodansha Manga Award for the shōjo category. The manga topped the 2006 and 2007 list of Takarajimasha's Kono Manga ga Sugoi! guidebook of top 20 manga series for female readers.

About.com's Deb Aoki lists Honey and Clover as the best new manga of 2008. Yū Aoi won the award for Best Actress at the 28th Yokohama Film Festival for her role as Hagumi Hanamoto in the live-action film.
