= March Comes In like a Lion =

Japanese manga series

- First tankōbon volume cover, featuring Rei Kiriyama

3月のライオン (Sangatsu no Raion)
- Genre: Coming-of-age; Romance; Slice of life
- Manga
- Written by: Chica Umino
- Published by: Hakusensha
- English publisher: NA: Denpa
- Imprint: Jets Comics; (2008–16); Young Animal Comics; (2016–present)
- Magazine: Young Animal
- Original run: July 13, 2007 – present
- Volumes: 18
- Manga

Sangatsu no Lion Shouwa Ibun: Shakunetsu no Toki
- Written by: Hideaki Nishikawa
- Published by: Hakusensha
- Imprint: Jets Comics; (2015–16); Young Animal Comics; (2016–20)
- Magazine: Young Animal
- Original run: April 24, 2015 – March 27, 2020
- Volumes: 10
- Anime television series
- Directed by: Akiyuki Shinbo; Kenjirou Okada
- Produced by: Akiko Yodo; Ryou Tomoda; Fuminari Fukino; Masahiro Nojima (1–22); Masayuki Sano (1–22); Tadao Iwaki (1–22); Takahiro Yoshikawa (1–22); Jun Sakata (22–44); Kazuhiko Yusa (22–44); Miku Ooshima (22–44
- Written by: Shaft (Note: Credited under the collective pen name Fuyashi Tō.) (composition); Akiyuki Shinbo (composition); Yukito Kizawa (scripts)
- Music by: Yukari Hashimoto
- Studio: Shaft
- Licensed by: NA: Aniplex of America; UK: Anime Limited
- Original network: NHK General TV
- Original run: October 8, 2016 – March 31, 2018
- Episodes: 44
- Live-action film
- March Comes In like a Lion (2017)
- icon

March Comes In like a Lion (Japanese: 3月のライオン, Hepburn: Sangatsu no Raion; lit. 'The Lion of March') is a Japanese manga series written and illustrated by Chica Umino. It has been serialized in Hakusensha's seinen manga magazine Young Animal since July 2007, with its chapters collected in 18 tankōbon volumes as of September 2025. It follows the life of Rei Kiriyama, an introvert professional shogi player, who gradually develops both his play and his relationship with others.

An anime television series adapted by Shaft aired on NHK G from October 2016 to March 2017 and a second season aired from October 2017 to March 2018, with each season consisting of 22 episodes. The English dubbed version was released in four parts by Aniplex of America between December 2017 and April 2019. A two-part live-action film adaptation was released in 2017. The manga has been licensed for English release by Denpa. A spin-off of the manga ran from 2015 to 2020.

March Comes In like a Lion won the fourth Manga Taishō, the 35th Kodansha Manga Award in its general category, the 18th Tezuka Osamu Cultural Prize's Grand Prize, and the manga division's Grand Prix of the 24th Japan Media Arts Festival. The story has been praised for the psychological depiction of its characters. The anime adaptation has been overall well received by critics, being considered as one of the best of 2010s.

== Plot ==
Rei Kiriyama's parents and younger sister died in an accident in his childhood. He then started living with the family of Masachika Kōda who was a friend of his father. Reaching adulthood, Rei left his foster family thinking he was only causing trouble. He now lives alone and has few friends. Among his acquaintances are three sisters of the Kawamoto family—Akari, Hinata, and Momo. As the story progresses, Rei deals with his maturation both as a professional shogi player and as a person, all the while strengthening his relationships with others, particularly the Kawamoto sisters.

The town where the main character Rei Kiriyama lives is set in Shinkawa which is situated along Tokyo's Sumida River. The Kawamoto family's home is set in Tsukuda which is connected to the town Rei lives in through the Chuo bridge. The shogi hall of the manga is set in Sendagaya area and it resembles the headquarters of the Japanese Shogi Association that is situated there.

== Characters ==
=== Main characters ===
Rei Kiriyama (桐山 零, Kiriyama Rei)
Voiced by: Kengo Kawanishi, Yumi Uchiyama (young) (Japanese); Khoi Dao, Wendee Lee (young) (English)
Portrayed by: Ryunosuke Kamiki
17 years old at the beginning of the series, later turns 18. A five dan at the beginning of the series, he is later promoted to six dan. Rei became a professional shogi player while in middle school and his achievements soon made him one of the most promising players of his generation. After his parents and sister died in a traffic accident, he was taken in by his father's friend Kōda and became his apprentice in shogi. After becoming a professional shogi player and completing middle school, he decided to become independent and not attend high school. However, after feeling a "need" to attend school, Rei joins a high school after a one-year delay. He lives in the city of Rokugatsu-chō (June town).
Akari Kawamoto (川本 あかり, Kawamoto Akari)
Voiced by: Ai Kayano (Japanese); Laura Post (English)
Portrayed by: Kana Kurashina
A resident of Sangatsu-chō (March town), she is the eldest of three sisters. After her mother and grandmother's death, she starts taking care of her two younger sisters. In the morning, she helps her elderly grandfather run a traditional wagashi (Japanese confectionery) shop, Mikazuki-dō, while in the evening, she works as a hostess for a bar in Ginza, Misaki, which her aunt manages. Akari gets acquainted with Rei when she finds him on the street when his older shogi rivals got him drunk and abandoned him; she takes him to her home and looks after him all night, which starts Rei's close relationship with the family. She often calls Rei "Rei-kun". This leads Kyoko to become jealous of her.
Hinata Kawamoto (川本 ひなた, Kawamoto Hinata)
Voiced by: Kana Hanazawa (Japanese); Kayli Mills (English)
Portrayed by: Kaya Kiyohara
The second of the three sisters. A middle school student. She sleeps late in the mornings till the very last minute and often makes bentos by herself. She calls Rei "Rei-chan". Like her elder sister Akari, she likes taking care of Rei, who develops romantic feelings for her as the series progresses. She has a strong loyalty toward her friends and family. She aspires to be as mature as her sister when she gets older. Later she graduates from middle school, enrolls at the same high school where Rei studies, and starts dating him.
Momo Kawamoto (川本 モモ, Kawamoto Momo)
Voiced by: Misaki Kuno (Japanese); Xanthe Huynh (English)
Portrayed by: Chise Niitsu
The youngest of the three sisters. A preschool student, she attends a daycare center. Pure and innocent, she has a bit of a selfish streak at times. Her favorite anime character is Bodoro (modelled on My Neighbour Totoro's Totoro). She calls Rei "Rei-chan".

=== Kōda family ===
Masachika Kōda (幸田 柾近, Kōda Masachika)
Voiced by: Tōru Ōkawa (Japanese); Cam Clarke (English)
Portrayed by: Etsushi Toyokawa
Rei's shogi teacher, a pro eight dan. He was both a friend and rival in shogi to Rei's biological father. After Rei's parents and sister died, he adopts Rei and guides him in shogi. He is serious about shogi and is very strict with his biological children when they were studying it themselves. Because of the attention that their father showed Rei, both the Koda children grew to resent Rei and treated him poorly as he was growing up in their household.
Kyōko Kōda (幸田 香子, Kōda Kyōko)
Voiced by: Marina Inoue (Japanese); Lauren Landa (English)
Portrayed by: Kasumi Arimura
Kōda's daughter and Ayumu's older sister. She is four years older than Rei. Beautiful and hot-tempered, Kyōko seems to hold a grudge against Rei as she has the habit of exerting a negative influence on him by discouraging him purposefully before his matches. She appears to be in love with Masamune Gotō, a married man. When she was younger, she was openly hostile to Rei when he first joins the family because she is jealous of the attention her father gives Rei. She aspired to become a professional shogi player but was discouraged by her father as the field was dominated by men and she was not talented enough to be a part of it. She often goes to Rei's apartment whenever she is feeling lonely. Later on, she admits to herself that she was unfair to Rei because she realizes that he was not trying to steal her family, rather, he just wanted to be part of one.
Ayumu Kōda (幸田 歩, Kōda Ayumu)
Voiced by: Marina Inoue (Japanese); Janice Kawaye (English)
Kōda's son and Kyōko's younger brother. He is the same age as Rei. After losing to Rei in shogi, he stopped playing at all and afterward started confining himself to his room and only playing video games.

=== Professional shōgi players ===
Harunobu Nikaidō (二海堂 晴信, Nikaidō Harunobu)
Voiced by: Nobuhiko Okamoto (Japanese); Zach Aguilar (English)
Portrayed by: Shota Sometani
Rei's self-proclaimed "best friend" and "lifelong rival". A four dan, he has played with Rei since they were children. Even though he appears to be healthy, he is chronically ill, which has contributed to his obesity. He is from an extremely wealthy family. He is modeled after an actual real-life shogi player Satoshi Murayama.
Kai Shimada (島田 開, Shimada Kai)
Voiced by: Shinichiro Miki (Japanese); Kirk Thornton (English)
Portrayed by: Kuranosuke Sasaki
In his late 30s, of the same age as Tōji Sōya. Eight dan. He is a senior fellow student of Nikaidō, whom he takes care of like his own little brother. He is a gentle-tempered person and is naturally inclined to look after younger shogi players. But he is also an incredibly tough soldier in shogi. He hosts the "Shimada shogi workshops", which he invited Rei to join. He originally comes from a rural area. In his youth, he had to work long hours on the farm and relied on his fellow villagers' donations to support his shogi study in Tokyo. He has chronic stomach pain because of the stress from his matches. Takanori Jingūji, the chairman of the Japan Shogi Association, often laments that Shimada is not charismatic or as good-looking as Sōya, the current Meijin, who is his same age.
Masamune Gotō (後藤 正宗, Gotō Masamune)
Voiced by: Hiroki Tōchi (Japanese); Ray Chase (English)
Portrayed by: Hideaki Itō
In his early 40s. Nine dan. A tall and muscular man with a stern and frightening face. His wife is in a coma and appears to have been hospitalized for a long time. He was a younger fellow pupil of Masachika Kōda, whose daughter Kyōko he appears to have a very complicated relationship with, though he calls her a "stalker". Rei sees him as the main antagonist in life for he thinks Gotō is having an affair with Kyōko and breaking her heart. He had an altercation with Rei where he punches him when he was confronted for his improper relationship with Kyōko. Even though she loves Gotō, Kyōko is the one who often helps him get gifts for his comatose wife. He is generally very forthright and impatient to the point of being arrogant, but he also does not hesitate to stand up for Shimada when he overhears some other players making demeaning comments about him.
Tōji Sōya (宗谷 冬司, Sōya Tōji)
Voiced by: Akira Ishida (Japanese); Todd Haberkorn (English)
Portrayed by: Ryo Kase
The current Meijin. He has longed for a rival like Rei. Similar to Rei, he became a professional shōgi player in middle school, and several players who faced both pointed out that their playing styles are very similar. He became the youngest ever Meijin at age 21. Later in the story, it's revealed that he has intermittent hearing loss due to unknown causes.
Issa Matsumoto (松本 一砂, Matsumoto Issa)
Voiced by: Subaru Kimura (Japanese); Doug Erholtz (English)
Portrayed by: Hiroyuki Onoue
26 years old. Five dan. A quite expressive and enthusiastic person, he can be aggressive at times as well. He comes from the countryside. He is a fan of Akari.
Tatsuyuki Misumi (三角 龍雪, Misumi Tatsuyuki)
Voiced by: Tomokazu Sugita (Japanese); Robbie Daymond (English)
Portrayed by: Tomoya Nakamura
26 years old. Six dan. He is often called "Smith" (スミス, Sumisu). A bit aloof, he gets along well with Matsumoto.
Takeshi Tsujii (辻井 武史, Tsujii Takeshi)
Voiced by: Yuichi Nakamura (Japanese); Xander Mobus (English)
A nine dan professional shogi player, ranked A for the past eight years, Tsujii Takeshi is a lover of wordplay and craves public attention. Other people within the shogi world call him waste of good looks' due to his propensity for dad jokes and terrible puns. He is usually the only one to laugh at his gags. Tsujii played against Rei during the quarterfinals of the 20th Lion King Tournament.
Shōichi Matsunaga (松永 正一, Matsunaga Shōichi)
Voiced by: Kazuo Oka (Japanese); Steve Kramer (English)
65 years old. A seven dan. He is a veteran who has been a professional shogi player for over 40 years. He comes from Fukushima.
Manabu Yasui (安井学, Yasui Manabu)
Voiced by: Mitsuo Iwata (Japanese); Joe J. Thomas (English)
A six dan. Upon losing a match, he lost his temper, thus resulting in him divorcing his wife.
Raidō Fujimoto (藤本 雷堂, Fujimoto Raidō)
Voiced by: Akio Ōtsuka (Japanese); Taylor Henry (English)
Shogi Dragon titleholder. Passionate about eventually dethroning Sōya. He temporarily separates from his wife when he thinks a hostess from a bar has genuine affection for him.

=== Other characters ===
Yūsuke Takahashi (高橋 勇介, Takahashi Yūsuke)
Voiced by: Yoshimasa Hosoya (Japanese); Chris Hackney (English)
A middle school student. A childhood friend and classmate of Hinata's, he is her first crush. He is the son of a milkman. He is the ace of his school's baseball team and aims to be a professional. Since Rei became a professional shogi player in middle school, Yūsuke greatly looks up to him. His father and grandfather are both fans of Rei. He is very straightforward and encourages Hinata during the time she was being bullied. To realize his dream to become a professional, he moves to a high school in Shikoku seeking to participate in the kōshien baseball tournament, much to Hinata's sadness.
Someji Kawamoto (川本 相米二, Kawamoto Someji)
Voiced by: Shigeru Chiba
Portrayed by: Gin Maeda
The grandfather of the three Kawamoto sisters. He runs a traditional wagashi shop, Mikazuki-dō (Crescent Moon). Even though he gives off an impression of a grumpy old man, he dotes on his granddaughters a lot, in particular Momo, and aims to live long enough to send them away for their marriages. He is incredibly passionate about being the sole male protector of the family.
Hanaoka (花岡)
Voiced by: Yōji Ueda (Japanese); Doug Stone (English)
The butler of the Nikaidō family, who has been in continuous service for them for over 45 years. A gentle and kind elderly man, he has been taking care of Harunobu ever since he was a baby.
Takashi Hayashida (林田 高志, Hayashida Takashi)
Voiced by: Takahiro Sakurai (Japanese); Keith Silverstein (English)
A teacher of the high school where Rei decided to join. He is a big fan of shogi and regularly reads shogi magazines. He is the only one in the high school who had heard of Rei being a professional shogi player though when he first knew of him joining, he presumed he only had the same surname. He speaks in a very friendly manner with Rei and is often concerned with his well-being, always thinking of ways to help him socialize with others. He later develops feelings for Akari.
Misaki Kawamoto (川本 美咲, Kawamoto Misaki)
Voiced by: Michiko Neya (Japanese); Wendee Lee (English)
Portrayed by: Yuka Itaya
The aunt of the three Kawamoto sisters. She, helped by Akari, manages a bar in Ginza called "Misaki". She has a strong and confident personality and employs Akari to work at her bar so she can at least spend one night a week dressing up so she does not lose herself to a state of only being a mother to her younger sisters. She encourages Rei to bring his fellow shogi players to the bar so she can make money off of them.
Eisaku Noguchi (野口 英作, Noguchi Eisaku)
Voiced by: Yūji Ueda (Japanese); Arnie Pantoja (English)
President of the After School Bunsen Burners Club, a chemistry club in the school Rei goes to. Because he has a mustache, everyone assumes that he is Rei's teacher.
Seijirou Amaido (政治ろ あまいど, Amaido Seijirō)
Portrayed by: Yusuke Iseya
The father of the three Kawamoto sisters. He left them and their mother when Momo was still a baby to live with another woman and returns several years later, after a long time without contacting them once. Once Misaki warns Rei about him, Rei makes his investigation about Seijirou and discovers that he kept leading an irresponsible life, involving himself with other women and abandoning them on his whim, just like he did with Akari, Hinata, and Momo's mother. After Rei exposes Seijirou, the sisters reject his plea to raise their half-sister, the daughter of one of his other women, and he leaves with her to never return.
Kuro-chan (クロちゃん), Mike-chan (ミケちゃん) and Shiro-chan (シロちゃん)
Voiced by: Ai Kayano (Kuro-chan), Kana Hanazawa (Mike-chan) and Misaki Kuno (Shiro-chan) (Japanese); Laura Post (Kuro-chan), Kayli Mills (Mike-chan) and Xanthe Huynh (Shiro-chan) (English)
The three cats of the Kawamoto household. Kuro-chan the tuxedo cat and Mike-chan the calico cat were the first two gathered, while Shiro-chan the white cat is a new arrival. They are big-eyed and always appear hungry. Shiro-chan looks strikingly like an owl at times.
Mikako Kawamoto (川本美香子, Kawamoto Mikako)
Voiced by: Mikako Takahashi (Japanese); Janice Kawaye (English)
The late mother of the three Kawamoto sisters.
Sai Kawamoto (川本 彩, Kawamoto Sai)
Voiced by: Yō Taichi
The late grandmother of the three Kawamoto sisters.

== Production ==
The English title March Comes In Like a Lion is written on the cover of the manga. Although Umino had not seen the 1992 film March Comes In like a Lion, the movie poster and the title of the movie left an impression on her: "A girl with a black haircut is holding a half-eaten ice cream in her mouth". This phrase is from the British weather proverb "March comes in like a lion and goes out like a lamb". In addition, the supervisor, Manabu Senzaki, commented that the shogi rankings begin in June, and the final game for promotion and demotion is held in March, so the professionals become lions in March.

Umino stated that the manga is "a story based on researching and hearing various stories about worlds [she] didn't know" whereas her previous work, Honey and Clover is "a story about a world [she] already knew without having to extend [herself]". She chose to write something different from her previous work for if it was a failure, people would think she moved to another field too hastily rather than call her a "one-hit wonder".

Umino stated that she only wanted an adaptation if it was to be directed by Akiyuki Shinbo and produced at Shaft, otherwise the manga "did not need to be adapted". She doubted if they would accept to adapt the manga as, unlike adapting a light novel (like Monogatari) or original anime (such as Puella Magi Madoka Magica), they would not have much freedom. Ryou Tomoda, Umino's editor from Hakusensha, asked about the possibility of the director-studio duo adapting the work, but was told that such a production would be impossible. Despite this, Makoto Tanaka, the son of famous shogi player Torahiko Tanaka, who worked at Tohokushinsha Film, approached Tomoda about the potential for an anime adaptation as he was a fan of the manga. Through Tanaka, Tomoda was able to meet with Aniplex producer (and soon-to-be CEO) Atsuhiro Iwakami about the possibility of asking Shinbo and Shaft to make the series. Iwakami then met with Mitsutoshi Kubota (CEO of Shaft) and Shinbo, and the two agreed to the project. Although Shinbo is credited as director, many of the main responsibilities were shared with series director Kenjirou Okada working under Shinbo.

As a fan of Shinbo's works with Shaft, Umino had originally wanted the series to take a similar aesthetic to Hisaharu Iijima's art direction and Akio Watanabe's character designs in Bakemonogatari; however, Shinbo told her that he did not think that type of art direction would suit the series, and Watanabe's schedule was already busy enough that he could not participate on the series. Instead, the services of art director Seiki Tamura were employed and the team made use of watercolor-style; and although Watanabe could not participate, the character designs were instead drawn by Shaft animator Kazuya Shiotsuki. Umino believes that Shinbo usually shows a close-up view of the characters rather than showing them from a distance, which is a reason she stated why she wanted him as the director. Shinbo said that he wanted to make each of the three primary settings—Rei's room, the Kawamoto's house, and the shogi hall—distinct to make the world into a sort of triangle. He also visited Tsukishima to see the Kawamoto house area and a bridge used in the manga.

In the 17th volume of the manga, released in August 2023, Umino revealed that the manga was heading to its final stretch.

== Media ==
=== Manga ===
Written and illustrated by Chica Umino, March Comes In like a Lion started in Hakusensha's seinen manga magazine Young Animal on July 13, 2007. Hakusensha has collected its chapters into individual tankōbon volumes. The first volume was released on February 22, 2008. The first eleven volumes were originally released under Hakusensha's Jets Comics imprint, before Hakuensha rebranded it as Young Animal Comics starting in June 2016. As of September 2025, 18 volumes have been released.

In North America, Denpa announced in March 2021 that they have licensed the manga for English release. The first volume was released on June 6, 2023.

A spin-off manga, titled Sangatsu no Lion Shouwa Ibun: Shakunetsu no Toki (3月のライオン昭和異聞 灼熱の時代; "March Comes In like a Lion – The Untold Showa-Era Tale: Scorching Times"), by Hideaki Nishikawa, was published in Young Animal from April 24, 2015, to March 27, 2020. It features 27-year-old Takanori Jingūji who is the chairman of the Japanese Shogi Association in the manga. Its chapters were collected in ten volumes, released from September 26, 2015, to May 29, 2020.

==== Volumes ====
No.	Original release date	Original ISBN	English release date	English ISBN
1	February 22, 2008	978-4-592-14511-0	June 6, 2023	978-1-63442-812-5
Chapter 1: "Rei Kiriyama"; Chapter 2: "A Riverside Town"; Chapter 3: "Akari"; Chapter 4: "The Other Side of the Bridge"; Chapter 5: "Harunobu"; Chapter 6: "Beyond the Night Sky"; Chapter 7: "Hina"; Chapter 8: "VS."; Chapter 9: "Contract"; Chapter 10: "Over the Cuckoo's Nest"
2	November 28, 2008 (Note: The second volume of the manga featured an alternate cover illustrated by Berserk manga artist Kentaro Miura.)	978-4-592-14512-7	April 9, 2024	978-1-63442-975-7
Chapter 11: "Child of God (Part 1)"; Chapter 12: "Child of God (Part 2)"; Chapter 13: "Child of God (Part 3)"; Chapter 14: "Important Things, Important Matters"; Chapter 15: "Teach Me Shogi"; Chapter 16: "Image"; Chapter 17: "Distant Thunder (Part 1)"; Chapter 18: "Distant Thunder (Part 2)"; Chapter 19: "Distant Thunder (Part 3)"; Chapter 20: "Something Given (Part 1)"; Chapter 21: "Something Given (Part 2)"
3	August 12, 2009	978-4-592-14513-4	November 26, 2024	978-1-63442-836-1
Chapter 22: "The Old Year"; Chapter 23: "The New Year"; Chapter 24: "What Lies on the Opposite Shore"; Chapter 25: "Black River (Part 1)"; Chapter 26: "Black River (Part 2)"; Chapter 27: "Beyond the Door"; Chapter 28: "Dazzling Darkness"; Chapter 29: "Just a Bit of Water"; Chapter 30: "Moonlight"; Chapter 31: "Mass of Ego"; Chapter 32: "Run Through the Night"
4	April 9, 2010	978-4-592-14514-1	September 9, 2025	978-1-63442-872-9
Chapter 33: "Middle of a Hill"; Chapter 34: "Silver Thread"; Chapter 35: "Water's Surface"; Chapter 36: "Bottom of the Blue Night"; Chapter 37: "Torrent"; Chapter 38: "Passing Time"; Chapter 39: "Through the Night"; Chapter 40: "Kyoto (Part 1)"; Chapter 41: "Kyoto (Part 2)"; Chapter 42: "Kyoto (Part 3)"
5	November 26, 2010	978-4-592-14515-8	November 24, 2026	978-1-63442-874-3
Chapter 43: "When Cherry Blossoms Bloom"; Chapter 44: "Tiny Murmur"; Chapter 45: "New Semester"; Chapter 46: "Western Sun"; Chapter 47: "Lamune"; Chapter 48: "Confusion"; Chapter 49: "Kumakura"; Chapter 50: "June"; Chapter 51: "Ladybug Bush (Part 1)"; Chapter 52: "Ladybug Bush (Part 2)"; Chapter 53: "Ladybug Bush (Part 3)"
6	July 22, 2011	978-4-592-14516-5	—	—
Chapter 54: "Sentiment"; Chapter 55: "Confession (Part 1)"; Chapter 56: "Confession (Part 2)"; Chapter 57: "Letter"; Chapter 58: "Start of the Rainy Season"; Chapter 59: "Hachiya"; Chapter 60: "Midday Moon"; Chapter 61: "Adventures"; Chapter 62: "Kingdom (Part 1)"; Chapter 63: "Kingdom (Part 2)"
7	March 23, 2012	978-4-592-14517-2	—	—
Chapter 64: "Silver Wings"; Chapter 65: "River Scenery"; Chapter 66: "The Place the Sun Shines"; Chapter 67: "Small World"; Chapter 68: "Black Mist"; Chapter 69: "Light"; Chapter 70: "Small Palm"; Chapter 71: "Sunny Place"; Chapter 72: "Flowing Thing"; Chapter 73: "White Storm (Part 1)"
8	December 14, 2012	978-4-592-14518-9	—	—
Chapter 74: "White Storm (Part 2)"; Chapter 75: "White Storm (Part 3)"; Chapter 76: "White Storm (Part 4)"; Chapter 77: "White Storm (Part 5)"; Chapter 78: "Restart"; Chapter 79: "Burnt Field (Part 1)"; Chapter 80: "Burnt Field (Part 2)"; Chapter 81: "Burnt Field (Part 3)"; Chapter 82: "Burnt Field (Part 4)"; Chapter 83: "Being Here"
9	September 27, 2013	978-4-592-14519-6	—	—
Chapter 84: "Summer Vacation (Part 1)"; Chapter 85: "Summer Vacation (Part 2)"; Chapter 86: "New Year"; Chapter 87: "Passing Time"; Chapter 88: "Spring Comes"; Chapter 89: "The Children of Sangatsu Town"; Chapter 90: "The Man Called a Grim Reaper"; Chapter 91: "Family (Part 1)"; Chapter 92: "Family (Part 2)"; Chapter 93: "Bug"; Chapter 94: "Family (Part 3)"
10	November 28, 2014	978-4-592-14520-2	—	—
Chapter 95: "New Days"; Chapter 96: "Lunch Break"; Chapter 97: "Other Home"; Chapter 98: "Soft Wind"; Chapter 99: "A Town Where it Rains"; Chapter 100: "Swimming Man (Part 1)"; Chapter 101: "Swimming Man (Part 2)"; Chapter 102: "Visitor (Part 1)"; Chapter 103: "Visitor (Part 2)"; Chapter 104: "Promise"
11	September 25, 2015	978-4-592-14521-9	—	—
Chapter 105: "A Small Talk"; Chapter 106: "Fun Dinner"; Chapter 107: "Osaka (Part 1)"; Chapter 108: "Osaka (Part 2)"; Chapter 109: "Osaka (Part 3)"; Chapter 110: "Osaka (Part 4)"; Chapter 111: "The Night the Cuckoo Sang"; Chapter 112: "Sunday (Part 1)"; Chapter 113: "Sunday (Part 2)"; Chapter 114: "Gentle Song"; Chapter 114.5: "Spinoff: Fighter"
12	September 29, 2016	978-4-592-14522-6	—	—
Chapter 115: "Party Invitation"; Chapter 116: "The Tale of Elizabeth the Faithful Dog"; Chapter 117: "The Satsuma Arc (Part 1)"; Chapter 118: "The Satsuma Arc (Part 2)"; Chapter 119: "The Satsuma Arc (Part 3)"; Chapter 120: "The Satsuma Arc (Part 4)"; Chapter 121: "The Path Lit by the Paper Lanterns (Part 1)"; Chapter 122: "The Path Lit by the Paper Lanterns (Part 2)"; Chapter 123: "The Path Lit by the Paper Lanterns (Part 3)"; Chapter 124: "The Path Lit by the Paper Lanterns (Part 4)"; Chapter 125: "The Path Lit by the Paper Lanterns (Part 5)"; Chapter 126: "The Night of the Summer Festival"
13	September 29, 2017	978-4-592-14523-3	—	—
Chapter 127: "Distant Fireworks"; Chapter 128: "Ginza"; Chapter 129: "The Wind's 20,000 Miles (Part 1)"; Chapter 130: "Midsummer's End"; Chapter 131: "The Wind's 20,000 Miles (Part 2)"; Chapter 132: "The Wind's 20,000 Miles (Part 3)"; Chapter 133: "The Wind's 20,000 Miles (Part 4)"; Chapter 134: "The Wind's 20,000 Miles (Part 5)"; Chapter 135: "The Wind's 20,000 Miles (Part 6)"; Chapter 136: "The Smell of Rain"; Chapter 137: "The Smell of the Rain, the Smell of the River (Part 1)"; Chapter 138: "The Smell of the Rain, the Smell of the River (Part 2)"; Chapter 139: "The Thing Lying Right in Front of Your Eyes"
14	December 21, 2018	978-4-592-16024-3	—	—
Chapter 140: "Fluffy Treasure"; Chapter 141: "Nostalgic Flavor (Part 1)"; Chapter 142: "Nostalgic Flavor (Part 2)"; Chapter 143: "By the Side of the Red Bridge (Part 1)"; Chapter 144: "By the Side of the Red Bridge (Part 2)"; Chapter 145: "By the Side of the Red Bridge (Part 3)"; Chapter 146: "By the Side of the Red Bridge (Part 4)"; Chapter 147: "By the Side of the Red Bridge (Part 5)"; Chapter 148: "Autumn Scenery (Part 1)"; Chapter 149: "Autumn Scenery (Part 2)"; Chapter 150: "Autumn Scenery (Part 3)"; Chapter 151: "Autumn Scenery (Part 4)"; Chapter 152: "Autumn Scenery (Part 5)" (Note: Chapters 152 and 153 were combined as chapter 152 in the volume release.)
15	December 26, 2019	978-4-592-16025-0	—	—
Chapter 154: "On the Night the Stars Fall Upon (Part 1)"; Chapter 155: "On the Night the Stars Fall Upon (Part 2)"; Chapter 156: "Azusa Number 1 (Part 1)"; Chapter 157: "Azusa Number 1 (Part 2)"; Chapter 158: "Azusa Number 1 (Part 3)"; Chapter 159: "Azusa Number 1 (Part 4)"; Chapter 160: "Azusa Number 1 (Part 5)"; Chapter 161: "Path (Part 1)"; Chapter 162: "Path (Part 2)"; Chapter 163: "Path (Part 3)"; Chapter 164: "Path (Part 4)"; Chapter 165: "Path (Part 5)"; Chapter 166: "Path (Part 6)"; Chapter 166.5: "Akari's Ginza Story"
16	September 29, 2021	978-4-592-16026-7	—	—
Chapter 167: "Winter Bell Sound"; Chapter 168: "December Rain (Part 1)"; Chapter 169: "December Rain (Part 2)"; Chapter 170: "New Year (Part 1)"; Chapter 171: "New Year (Part 2)"; Chapter 172: "New Year (Part 3)" (Note: Chapters 172, 173, and 174 were combined as chapter 172 in the volume release.); Chapter 173: "New Year (Part 4)"; Chapter 174: "Winter Scent (Part 1)"; Chapter 175: "Winter Scent (Part 2)" (Note: Chapters 177 and 178 were combined as chapter 175 in the volume release.); Chapter 176: "Winter Scent (Part 3)"; Chapter 177: "Winter Scent (Part 4)"; Chapter 178: "Path ~Path~ (Part 1)"; Chapter 179: "Path ~Path~ (Part 2)" (Note: Chapters 182 and 183 were combined as chapter 179 in the volume release.)
17	August 29, 2023	978-4-592-16026-7	—	—
Chapter 180: "Path ~Path~ (Part 3)" (Note: Chapters 185 and 186 were combined as chapter 180 in the volume release.); Chapter 181: "Path ~Path~ (Part 4)"; Chapter 182: "Path ~Path~ (Part 5)"; Chapter 183: "Path ~Path~ (Part 6)"; Chapter 184: "Path ~Path~ (Part 7)" (Note: Chapters 190 and 191 were combined as chapter 184 in the volume release.); Chapter 185: "Path ~Path~ (Part 8)"; Chapter 186: "Akari-chan's Great Adventure (Part 1)"; Chapter 187: "Akari-chan's Great Adventure (Part 2)"; Chapter 188: "Akari-chan's Great Adventure (Part 3)" (Note: Chapters 195 and 196 were combined as chapter 188 in the volume release.); Chapter 189: "Distant Music (Part 1)"; Chapter 190: "Distant Music (Part 2)"; Chapter 191: "Distant Music (Part 3)"; Chapter 192: "Distant Music (Part 4)"; Chapter 193: "Distant Music (Part 5)"; Chapter 194: "Akari's Ginza Story (Part 2): Beyond Pressure" (Note: Chapter 184 was changed to chapter 194 in the volume release.)
18	September 29, 2025	978-4-592-16028-1	—	—
Chapter 195: "On The Roof"; Chapter 196: "What I Noticed"; Chapter 197: "Winter Sunshine (Part 1)"; Chapter 198: "Winter Sunshine (Part 2)"; Chapter 199: "Holy Bridge (Part 1)"; Chapter 200: "Open The Door (Part 1)"; Chapter 201: "Open The Door (Part 2)"; Chapter 202: "Open The Door (Part 3)"; Chapter 203: "Open The Door (Part 4)"; Chapter 204: "Open The Door (Part 5)"; Chapter 205: "Open The Door (Part 6)"; Chapter 206: "Open The Door (Part 7)"; Chapter 207: "Holy Bridge (Part 2)"; Chapter 208: "Adventurers (Part 2)"

==== Chapters not yet published in volume format ====
These chapters have yet to be published in a tankōbon volume.

- Chapter 209: "Chapter 216" (Note: Magazine chapter count is ahead of volume chapter count.)
- Chapter 210: "Chapter 217"
- Chapter 211: "Chapter 218"
- Chapter 212: "Chapter 219"
- Chapter 213: "Chapter 220"
- Chapter 214: "Chapter 221"
- Chapter 215: "Chapter 222"
- Chapter 216: "Chapter 223"

=== Anime ===
An anime television series adaptation was announced in the Young Animal magazine's 19th issue of 2015 on September 25, 2015. The series is produced by Shaft and directed by Akiyuki Shinbo and Kenjirou Okada, featuring character designs by Nobuhiro Sugiyama and music composed by Yukari Hashimoto. The anime's first opening and ending theme songs are performed by Bump of Chicken, titled "Answer" and "Fighter", respectively. Yuki performed the series' second opening theme song, titled "Goodbye Bystander", while Kenshi Yonezu performed the series' second ending theme song, titled "Orion".

Season one of the anime began airing on October 8, 2016, and finished airing on March 18, 2017, with a total of 22 episodes. A second season, announced at the end of the first season's final episode, premiered on October 14, 2017, and finished airing on March 31, 2018, with a total of 22 episodes. The series aired on NHK G at 23:00 on Saturdays. It was also simulcasted by Crunchyroll. The series was licensed by Aniplex of America and Anime Limited for North America and the United Kingdom, respectively. Aniplex of America released the English dub of the first season in two Blu-ray discs, the first half of the season was released on December 19, 2017, and the second on April 10, 2018. The second season was also released in two halves, the first on December 18, 2018, and the second on April 9, 2019.

=== Live-action film ===
A two-part live action film adaptation of the same name directed by Keishi Ōtomo, starring Ryūnosuke Kamiki and distributed by Toho and Asmik Ace was released in two parts in 2017, with the first part released on March 18 and the second released on April 22.

== Reception ==
=== Manga ===
By January 2022, March Comes In like a Lion had over 3 million copies in circulation.

The manga was nominated for the second annual Manga Taishō award in 2009; and it won this award in its fourth edition in 2011. Also in 2011, it won the 35th Kodansha Manga Award in the general category, along with Space Brothers. In 2014, it won the Grand Prize of the 18th Tezuka Osamu Cultural Prize. In 2021, the manga won the manga division's Grand Prize of the 24th Japan Media Arts Festival. On Kadokawa Media Factory's Da Vinci magazine "Book of the Year" list, March Comes In like a Lion topped the list for three consecutive years from 2015 to 2017; it ranked fourth in 2019; eighth in 2020; seventeenth in 2022; and sixth in 2023. In the top manga for male readers category of Takarajimasha's Kono Manga ga Sugoi! list, the manga ranked fifth and tied for seventh (with Drifters) in 2012 and 2017, respectively. On TV Asahi's Manga Sōsenkyo 2021 poll, in which 150,000 people voted for their top 100 manga series, March Comes In like a Lion ranked 99th.

Denpa's English release (Volume 4) was nominated for Best Continuing Manga Series at the third American Manga Awards co-organized by Anime NYC and Japan Society in 2026.

=== Anime ===
The anime series was listed as one of the top 25 anime of 2010s by Anime Feminist. Crunchyroll listed it in their "Top 100 best anime of the 2010s". IGN also listed March Comes In like a Lion among the best anime series of the 2010s. The second season was placed as "runner-up" in IGN's "best anime series of 2018" list.

Both seasons of the anime adaption was given 4 stars out of 5 by Allen Moody of THEM Anime Reviews. He liked how Kyoko is shown to have a vulnerable side under her external cruelty and how the Kawamoto sisters are portrayed when Hinata is being bullied. He also found the story relatable to his own life, and stated "A neurotic and sometimes endearing hero, an incredibly nuanced "villainous" sibling, and a shogi master in the twilight of his career are all fine, I appreciate the things it is trying to do I can identify with some of the things that happen here from personal experience. Overall, lots of solid drama. It was a very pleasant surprise to discover".

Chris Beveridge of The Fandom Post also praised the portrayal of the characters and their lives. He liked Nikkaido's backstory and his connection with Shimada. Beveridge gave the anime an audio grade of "B+", and he gave the video an "A" praising how Shaft presented the details, animation quality, and color design in the series. After watching the first episode, Amelia Cook of Anime Feminist found the art direction unconventional. She liked the art style and praised the transition from the expression of Rei's depression to the presentation of humor saying that it was skillfully done. Marion Bea of the same website praised the exploration of the characters' lives and struggles. She also praised the portrayal of the character's psychology and the depiction of others' support in solving one's problems. Bea commended the use of the surrounding environment in portraying the characters' emotional state, for instance showing them struggling to keep swimming or surrounding them with snow.

== Notes ==
=== Book citations ===
- Takahashi, Yumi, ed. (November 23, 2019). Akiyuki Shimbo x Shaft Chronicle (in Japanese). Dotcom. ISBN 978-4-8354-5701-7.
