= Sennichite =

Rule in shogi

Sennichite (千日手, lit. "moves (for) a thousand days") or repetition draw is a rule in shogi stating that the game will end in a draw if the same position is repeated four times during a game as long as the repetitions do not involve checks.

== Explanation ==
If the same game position occurs four times with the same player to move and the same pieces in hand for each player, then the game ends in sennichite iff the positions are not due to perpetual check. (Perpetual check is an illegal move, which ends the game in a loss in tournament play.)

In professional shogi, a sennichite outcome is not a final result of a match as draws essentially do not count. There can be only one victorious through wins. This is a significant difference from western chess, in which a player can play specifically to obtain draws for gaining half points. In the case of sennichite, professional shogi players will have to immediately play a subsequent game (or as many games as necessary) with sides reversed in order to obtain a true win outcome. (That is, the player who was White becomes Black, and vice versa.) Also, depending on the tournament, professional players play the subsequent game in the remainder of the allowed game time. Usually there is a break time period between the replay games.

Sennichite is rare in professional shogi occurring in about 1–2% of games and even rarer in amateur games. In professional shogi, sennichite usually occurs in the opening as certain positions are reached that are theoretically disadvantaged for both sides (zugzwang). In amateur shogi, sennichite tends to occur in the middle or endgame as a result of poor positions.

=== Strategy ===
Aiming for sennichite may be a possible professional strategy for the White player in order to play the second game as Black, which has a slight statistical advantage and/or greater initiative. For instance, Bishop Exchange Fourth File Rook is a passive strategy for White with the goal of a sennichite (as it requires two tempo losses – swinging the rook and trading the bishops) while it is a very aggressive strategy if played by Black.

== History ==
Pre-1983 sennichite. The sennichite rule was previously defined by a sequence of moves (and not a position) that had three repetitions. The rule was changed to its current form in May 1983.

Historical sennichite. There was yet another repetition rule used historically by rule codifier Sōko Ōhashi who was the second Meijin from 1635 until his death in 1654: the player that started a repetition lost the game.

== Example ==
Repetition draws have historically been associated with the traditional Double Fortress opening (especially the Complete Fortress formation).

=== Watanabe vs Habu 2012 ===
Sennichite
Watanabe vs Habu 2012
☖ pieces in hand: 金_{2} 歩_{1}

9	8	7	6	5	4	3	2	1
香								香	1
金		銀							2
王		桂					歩	歩	3
歩	歩	桂				歩			4
		歩					歩		5
歩			歩		角	歩			6
玉	銀	桂						歩	7
	金								8
香		角	銀					香	9

☗ pieces in hand: 飛_{2} 銀_{1} 桂_{1} 歩_{5}
Position after 61...S*66 62.Px66 before Habu initiated the repetition sequence.
Sennichite
Watanabe vs Habu 2012
☖ pieces in hand: 金_{1} 歩_{1}

9	8	7	6	5	4	3	2	1
香								香	1
金		銀							2
王		桂					歩	歩	3
歩	歩	桂				歩			4
		歩					歩		5
歩			歩		角	歩			6
玉	銀	桂						歩	7
	金								8
香	金	角	銀					香	9

☗ pieces in hand: 飛_{2} 銀_{1} 桂_{1} 歩_{5}
62...G*89

A surprising repetition draw occurred in the endgame of a game between Akira Watanabe (Black) and Yoshiharu Habu on October 3, 2012. The opening was Third File Rook.

After the 121st move (= 61st move in western notation), White (Habu) found himself in a threatmate situation where Black (Watanabe) had a possible 9-move mate sequence of 62.R*83 Gx83 63.Sx83+ Kx83 64.R*82 Kx74 65.N*66 K-63 (or K-64) 66.G*54 [mate]. In order to prevent Black's future knight drop (N*66), White dropped a silver to the 66 square (61...S*66) forcing Black to capture it with his pawn (62.Px66) leaving the 66 square occupied and unable to accept a knight drop.

After this, White started setting up the repetition sequence starting with 62...G*89. Dropping the gold to the 89 square puts Black in his own threatmate situation as White is threatening the mate-in-one 63...Bx88+ [mate] on his next move.

Sennichite 2012
☖ pieces in hand: 金_{1} 歩_{1}

9	8	7	6	5	4	3	2	1
香								香	1
金		銀							2
王		桂					歩	歩	3
歩	歩	桂				歩			4
		歩					歩		5
歩			歩		角	歩			6
玉	銀	桂						歩	7
	金	飛							8
香	金	角	銀					香	9

☗ pieces in hand: 飛_{1} 銀_{1} 桂_{1} 歩_{5}
63.R*78
Sennichite 2012
☖ pieces in hand: 金_{2} 歩_{1}

9	8	7	6	5	4	3	2	1
香								香	1
金		銀							2
王		桂					歩	歩	3
歩	歩	桂				歩			4
		歩					歩		5
歩			歩		角	歩			6
玉	銀	桂						歩	7
	金	飛							8
香		角	銀					香	9

☗ pieces in hand: 飛_{1} 銀_{1} 桂_{1} 歩_{5}
63...Gx88

Therefore, Black defends the 88 square in the only way he can by dropping a rook to the seventh file (63.R*78). He cannot remove White's gold with his own gold on 88 (63.Gx89) since that gold is pinned by White's bishop on 79.

White, then, trades his golds via the 88 square (63...Gx88). This move is actually forced as Black is threatening to create a 3-move brinkmate sequence via 64.S*82 Gx82 65.Nx82+. And, since White does not have any checkmate sequence available to him, after this, Black will have a mate-in-one with +N83 (or G*83 or R*83). Thus, White must defend against the brinkmate by creating another threatmate against Black with 63...Gx88. This threatens the 3-move mate sequence: 64...Gx78 65.K-98 B-88+ [mate].

Sennichite 2012
☖ pieces in hand: 金_{2} 歩_{1}

9	8	7	6	5	4	3	2	1
香								香	1
金		銀							2
王		桂					歩	歩	3
歩	歩	桂				歩			4
		歩					歩		5
歩			歩		角	歩			6
玉	銀	桂						歩	7
	飛								8
香		角	銀					香	9

☗ pieces in hand: 飛_{1} 金_{1} 銀_{1} 桂_{1} 歩_{5}
64.Rx88
Sennichite 2012
☖ pieces in hand: 金_{1} 歩_{1}

9	8	7	6	5	4	3	2	1
香								香	1
金		銀							2
王		桂					歩	歩	3
歩	歩	桂				歩			4
		歩					歩		5
歩			歩		角	歩			6
玉	銀	桂						歩	7
	飛								8
香	金	角	銀					香	9

☗ pieces in hand: 飛_{1} 金_{1} 銀_{1} 桂_{1} 歩_{5}
64...G*89

Black, of course, must defend against the threatmate by capturing White's gold with his rook (64.Rx88).

After White's gold is removed, the board position is very similar to the position at after the 123rd move (the first diagram shown above). The only difference is that instead of Black having a gold on the 88 square Black has a rook on 88. However, this is sufficiently similar to force Black into a sennichite sequence in that Black's rook like the previous gold cannot capture White's bishop on 79 and also is pinned by the same bishop. And, since White still has a gold available to drop, he drops a gold again to the 89 square (64...G*89). This creates another threatmate (threatening again the same mate-in-one ...Bx88+).

Sennichite 2012
☖ pieces in hand: 金_{1} 歩_{1}

9	8	7	6	5	4	3	2	1
香								香	1
金		銀							2
王		桂					歩	歩	3
歩	歩	桂				歩			4
		歩					歩		5
歩			歩		角	歩			6
玉	銀	桂						歩	7
	飛	金							8
香	金	角	銀					香	9

☗ pieces in hand: 飛_{1} 銀_{1} 桂_{1} 歩_{5}
65.G*78
Sennichite 2012
☖ pieces in hand: 飛_{1} 金_{1} 歩_{1}

9	8	7	6	5	4	3	2	1
香								香	1
金		銀							2
王		桂					歩	歩	3
歩	歩	桂				歩			4
		歩					歩		5
歩			歩		角	歩			6
玉	銀	桂						歩	7
	金	金							8
香		角	銀					香	9

☗ pieces in hand: 飛_{1} 銀_{1} 桂_{1} 歩_{5}
65...Gx88

Black must again stop the threatmate by defending the 88 square – this time with a gold (65.G*78).

Similarly, White captures the rook on 88 with their gold creating the same threatmate as above (65...Gx88). It is here on the 130th move that the sennichite sequence technically starts.

Sennichite 2012
☖ pieces in hand: 飛_{1} 金_{1} 歩_{1}

9	8	7	6	5	4	3	2	1
香								香	1
金		銀							2
王		桂					歩	歩	3
歩	歩	桂				歩			4
		歩					歩		5
歩			歩		角	歩			6
玉	銀	桂						歩	7
	金								8
香		角	銀					香	9

☗ pieces in hand: 飛_{1} 銀_{1} 桂_{1} 歩_{5}
66.Gx88
Sennichite 2012
☖ pieces in hand: 飛_{1} 金_{1} 歩_{1}

9	8	7	6	5	4	3	2	1
香								香	1
金		銀							2
王		桂					歩	歩	3
歩	歩	桂				歩			4
		歩					歩		5
歩			歩		角	歩			6
玉	銀	桂						歩	7
	金	金							8
香		角	銀					香	9

☗ pieces in hand: 飛_{1} 銀_{1} 桂_{1} 歩_{5}
71...Gx88

White must again remove the threatmate by capturing White's gold (66.Gx88).

After these eight moves, we have a near identical position to the position after the 122nd move (62. Px66). However, there is a small difference in that now White has a rook in hand instead of the two golds and Black has a gold in hand instead of two rooks. Thus, although very similar (and functionally the same in terms of game play), this is not a repetition of the board position at move 122 and why the actual repetition sequence starts at move 130.

After 66...G*89 67.G*78 Gx88, there is a second repeat of the position at move 130. After 68.Gx88 G*89 69.G*78 Gx88, there is a third repetition. And, after 70.Gx88 G*89 71.G*78 Gx88, White makes the fourth repetition leading to sennichite. After this, according to professional shogi rules, a new game was started with Habu playing Black and Watanabe playing White.

== See also ==
- Threefold repetition (a similar rule in western chess)
- Perpetual check (a type of repetition in western chess, but illegal in shogi and xiangqi)
