= Mio Watanabe =

Japanese shogi player

- Native name: 渡辺弥生
- Born: September 2, 1979 (age 47)
- Hometown: Minamiuonuma, Niigata Prefecture

Career
- Achieved professional status: April 1, 2009 (aged 29)
- Badge number: W-41
- Rank: Women's 2-dan
- Teacher: Kazuharu Shoshi (7-dan)

Websites
- JSA profile page

Mio Watanabe (渡辺 弥生, Watanabe Mio; born September 2, 1979) is a Japanese women's professional shogi player ranked 2-dan.

== Early life ==
Watanabe was born in Minneapolis in the United States on September 2, 1979. Her father was an economist and in the United States for work purposes. She returned to Minamiuonuma, Niigata Prefecture with her family when she was eight years old. She attended elementary school, junior high school, and senior high school in Niigata Prefecture before enrolling in Tokyo University.

After graduating from Tokyo University in 2002, Watanabe decided to continue her education and was accepted into the university's College of Arts and Sciences. Although her initial goal was to become a mathematician or mathematical economist, she found that there were many others more gifted than herself in those fields and eventually stopped attending class. Although Watanabe knew the rules of shogi, she did not start becoming very interested in the game until she had re-enrolled in Tokyo University. She spent lots of time solving tsume shogi problems online and joined the university's shogi club. Uncertain about her future after deciding to leave college after completing her second year in 2005, her parents suggested focusing on shogi and she entered the Japan Shogi Association's Women's Professional Apprentice League in 2006 under the guidance of shogi professional Kazuharu Shoshi. She obtained women's professional status in April 2009.

== Women's shogi professional ==
=== Promotion history ===
Watanabe's promotion history is as follows:

- 2-kyū: April 1, 2009
- 1-kyū: March 3, 2011
- 1-dan: August 2, 2013
- 2-dan: March 20, 2023

Note: All ranks are women's professional ranks.

== Personal life ==
Watanabe graduated from the Tokyo University's Faculty of Economics in 2002. She is the first graduate of the university to become a women's professional shogi player.
