= Atsushi Miyata =

Japanese shogi player

- Native name: 宮田敦史
- Born: June 5, 1981 (age 44)
- Hometown: Yoshikawa, Saitama

Career
- Achieved professional status: October 1, 2001 (aged 20)
- Badge Number: 241
- Rank: 7-dan
- Teacher: Kazuharu Shoshi (7-dan)
- Meijin class: C1
- Ryūō class: 4

Websites
- JSA profile page

Atsushi Miyata (宮田 敦史, Miyata Atsushi; June 5, 1981) is a Japanese professional shogi player, ranked 7-dan. He is a six-time winner of the Tsume Shogi Solving Competition.

== Early life and apprenticeship ==
Atsushi Miyata was born in Yoshikawa, Saitama on June 5, 1981. Up until around the age of eight years old, he spent his time playing Japanese youth baseball, but a leg injury meant that he could not participate in practices. Unable to practice, Miyata started spending time at the local library where he found some beginners books on shogi and learned how to play the game.

In 1992, Miyata was accepted into the Japan Shogi Association's apprentice school at the rank of 6-kyū under the guidance of shogi professional Kazuharu Shoshi. He was promoted to 1-dan in January 1996, and then obtained full professional status and the rank of 4-dan in October 2001 after winning the 29th 3-dan League (April 2001 – September 2001) with a record of 15 wins and 3 losses.

== Shogi professional ==
=== Promotion history ===
The promotion history for Miyata is as follows:

- 6-kyū: 1992
- 1-dan: 1996
- 4-dan: October 1, 2001
- 5-dan: April 1, 2004
- 6-dan: September 3, 2010
- 7-dan: May 25, 2018

=== Awards and honors ===
Miyata received the Japan Shogi Association's 36th Annual Shogi Award (April 2008 – March 2009) for "Best Winning Percentage".

== Tsume Shogi Solving Competition ==
Miyata is a six-time winner of the Tsume Shogi Solving Competition. He won the competition five out of the first six years it was held (2004–6, 2008–9), (Note: Miyata did not participate in the 4th edition of the competition held in 2007 because he was on an official leave of absence for health reasons from December 20, 2006 until March 31, 2008.) and his sixth victory came in 2013 when he won the 10th edition of the competition.
