= Ayumu Matsuo =

Japanese Professional Shogi Player

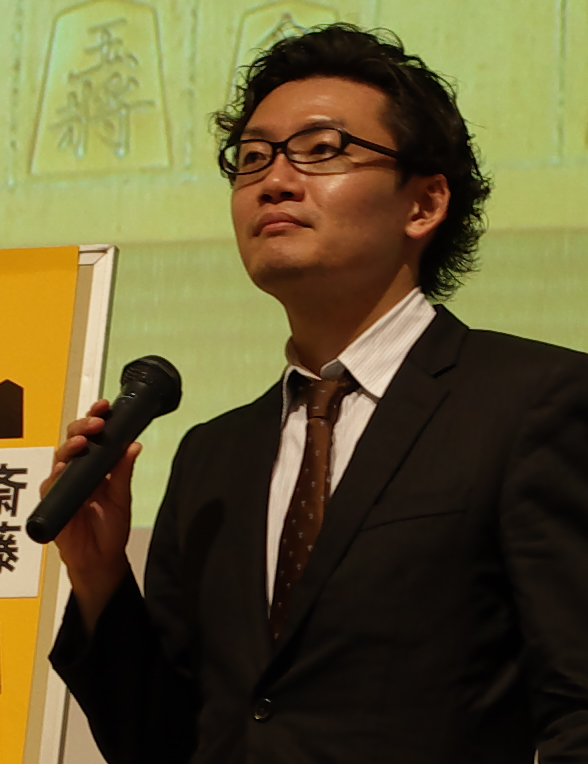
- Matsuo in October 2018.
- Native name: 松尾歩
- Born: March 29, 1980 (age 45)
- Hometown: Nisshin, Aichi

Career
- Achieved professional status: April 1, 1999 (aged 19)
- Badge Number: 231
- Rank: 8 dan
- Teacher: Kazuharu Shoshi
- Tournaments won: 1
- Meijin class: B2
- Ryūō class: 1

Websites
- JSA profile page

Ayumu Matsuo (松尾 歩, Matsuo Ayumu; born March 29, 1980) is a Japanese professional shogi player ranked 8-dan.

== Early life ==
Matsuo was born on March 29, 1980, in Nisshin, Aichi. His father, a professor at Nagoya University, taught him how to play shogi when he was a third-grade elementary school student, and he soon began regularly traveling to the Tokyo Shogi Kaikan to participate in official Japan Shogi Association training groups. Matsuo's training group results allowed him to enter the JSA's apprentice school at the rank of 6-kyū in March 1994 as a protegee of shogi professional Kazuharu Shoshi. After only one year as an apprentice, Matsuo achieved promotion to the rank of 1-kyū.

When he was a tenth-grade high school student, Matsuo asked his parents to allow him to leave school and move to Tokyo on his own so that he could fully focus on shogi. His parents were at first opposed to such a thing, but eventually changed their minds and gave their approval. Matsuo was promoted to 1-dan in 1997, and quickly advanced to the rank of 3-dan within eight months. Matsuo won the 3-dan League in his first attempt and was officially awarded professional status and the rank of 4-dan on April 1, 1999.

== Shogi professional ==
Matsuo defeated Kazuki Kimura two games to none to win the 32nd Shinjin-Ō tournament—a tournament for shogi professionals age 26 and under who are also ranked 6-dan or lower and are not currently a major title holder—in 2001.

Matsuo became the 66th professional to win 600 official games and be awarded the "Shogi Honor Award" when he defeated Daichi Sasaki in a 97th Kisei tournament preliminary round game on November 13, 2025.

=== Promotion history ===
The promotion history of Matsuo is as follows:

- 6-kyū: March 1994
- 1-dan: 1997
- 4-dan: April 1, 1999
- 5-dan: April 1, 2002
- 6-dan: April 21, 2006
- 7-dan: September 27, 2007
- 8-dan: July 2, 2015

=== Titles and other championships ===
Matsuo has yet to appear in a major title match, but he has won one non-title tournament.

=== Awards and honors ===
Matsuo received the Japan Shogi Association Annual Shogi Awards for "Best New Player" in 2001, the Kōzō Masuda Award in 2013 and "Special Game of the Year" in 2020.

=== Year-end prize money and game fee ranking ===
Matsuo has finished in the "Top 10" of the JSA's year-end prize money and game fee rankings once: he finished 9th with JPY 19,850,000 in earnings in 2017.

== Personal life ==
Mastuo married women's professional shogi player and fellow Shoshi protegee Kaori Uekawa in April 2005. However, the Ladies Professional Shogi-players' Association of Japan announced on December 1, 2014, that Uekawa would no longer be competing under the name "Matsuo".
