= Maho =

Maho may refer to:

== Term ==
- Maho, tropical hibiscus tree common throughout the Caribbean (thespesia populnea, Hibiscus elatus, or Hibiscus Tilaceus)
- Maho, a West Indian Caribbean slang term for a man who spends too much time drinking beer and fishing on the beach
- a Pali noun for a singular religious festival, the nominative singular of maha
- Maho or Manusia homo (English: Gay man), an Indonesian derogatory term for homosexuality
- A Finnish adjective meaning unable to bear children, sterile.

== Geography ==
- Maho Beach, a beach in Sint Maarten
- Maho, Sri Lanka, a town in North Western Province
- Maho, Eritrea, a town in Eritrea
- Maho Bay, a beach in Saint John, U.S. Virgin Islands

== People ==
Maho is a feminine Japanese given name.

Typical kanji spellings include 真帆, 麻帆 and 真穂, though there may be others. It also sometimes rendered in hiragana: まほ and less often in katakana: マホ.

- Maho Aikawa (相川 茉穂; born 1999), Japanese former idol from Angerme
- Maho Hanaoka (花岡 麻帆; born 1976), Japanese long and triple jumper
- Maho Isotani (礒谷 真帆; born 2002), Japanese women's professional shogi player
- Maho Iyama (伊山 摩穂; born 1999), Japanese former idol from GEM (band)
- Maho Kakita (垣田 真穂; born 2004), Japanese racing cyclist
- Maho Kurone (黒音 まほ), Japanese professional wrestler
- Maho Kuwako (桑子 真帆; born 1987), Japanese announcer and news anchor
- Maho Matsunaga (松永 真穂; born 1993), Japanese idol and voice actress
- Maho Nonami (野波 麻帆; born 1980), Japanese actress known for 2LDK
- Maho Omori (大盛 真歩; born 1999), Japanese idol from AKB48
- Maho Segawa (瀬川 真帆; born 1996), Japanese field hockey player
- Maho Shimizu (清水 万帆; born 1960), Japanese women's footballer
- Maho Tomita (富田 麻帆; born 1987), Japanese actress, voice actress, and singer
- Maho Toyota (とよた 真帆; born 1967), Japanese actress and model
- Maho Ueno (上野 真歩; born 2002), Japanese field hockey player
- Maho Yamaguchi (山口 真帆; born 1995), Japanese former idol from NGT48

Fictional characters:

- Maho Kazami, a sister of the protagonist of Onegai Teacher
- Maho Minami, a character from BECK
- Maho, a character from Doki Doki Majo Shinpan
- Maho, (Himeko Katagiri), a character from Pani Poni Dash
- Maho, a character from Mushishi, episode 3 ("Tender Horns" or "Yawarakai Tsuno")
- Maho, a character in Kare Kano
- Maho Hiyajo, a character in the visual novel Steins;Gate 0
- Maho Nishizumi, a character in Girls und Panzer and its sequels
- Maho Nosaka, a character in the film Battle Royale II: Requiem
