= Tsume =

Tsume may refer to:

- a character in the Japanese animation Wolf's Rain
- a checkmate in shogi: tsumeshogi
