= Shogi strategy =

Board game strategy

Shogi, like western chess, can be divided into the opening, middle game and endgame, each requiring a different strategy. The opening consists of arranging one's defenses and positioning for attack, the middle game consists of attempting to break through the opposing defenses while maintaining one's own, and the endgame starts when one side's defenses have been compromised.

== Tactics ==
Many basic tactics (手筋 tesuji) of shogi are similar to those of chess tactics, involving forks, pins, removing the defender and other techniques, all of which are considered very strong when used effectively.

However, other tactics, particularly ones involving dropped pieces, have no parallel in western chess.

== Relative piece value ==
Shogi pieces may be considered to have different valuations in which some pieces are generally more valuable than others – all other things being equal. (cf. piece value in western chess.)

There are three main valuation groups:

1. the king, which has an absolute value since the game is lost if mated
2. the two major pieces (大駒, oogoma): rook, bishop
3. the minor pieces (小駒, kogoma): pawn, lance, knight, silver, gold

The minor pieces can be further grouped in the following valuation hierarchy:

gold > silver > (knight, lance) > pawn

Sometimes, the relative pieces are formalized with specific numerical values. This is particularly common in the explicit formalizations found in computer shogi. However, Reijer Grimbergen notes that shogi piece valuation is not standardized as different players disagree on the exact values. For instance, Grimbergen uses the following relative values in a Move Merit Analysis formalization:

Grimbergen
Piece		Value
歩	pawn	1
香, 桂	lance, knight	3
銀, 金	silver, gold	5
角	bishop	8
飛	rook	9
馬	promoted bishop	12
龍	promoted rook	13

Another formalization used by program YSS 7.0 of 1997 had the following relative values:

YSS 7.0
Piece		Value	Piece in hand		Value	Promoted Piece		Value
歩	pawn	1.00	歩 手駒	pawn in hand	1.15	と	promoted pawn	4.20
香	lance	4.30	香 手駒	lance in hand	4.80	杏	promoted lance	6.30
桂	knight	4.50	桂 手駒	knight in hand	5.10	圭	promoted knight	6.40
銀	silver	6.40	銀 手駒	silver in hand	7.20	全	promoted silver	6.70
金	gold	6.90	金 手駒	gold in hand	7.80	–	–	–
角	bishop	8.90	角 手駒	bishop in hand	11.10	馬	promoted bishop	11.50
飛	rook	10.40	飛 手駒	rook in hand	12.70	龍	promoted rook	13.00

Kōji Tanigawa, Yasumitsu Satō, and Larry Kaufman have suggested the following values:

Piece	Tanigawa (1982)	Tanigawa (NHK 2006)	Satō	Kaufman	Promoted Piece	Tanigawa (1982)	Tanigawa (NHK 2006)	Satō	Kaufman
歩	1	1	1	1	と	12	6	11	10
香	5	3	6	4	杏	10	6	11	9
桂	6	4	6	5	圭	10	6	11	9
銀	8	5	10	7	銀	9	6	11	8
金	9	6	11	8	–	–	–	–	–
角	13	8	17	11	馬	15	10	20	15
飛	15	10	19	13	龍	17	12	22	17

Under two of these valuation schemes, the promoted pawn, lance and knight all have a higher value than a gold even though when promoted they move the same as a gold. The reason for this is that they will return to their lesser values when captured by an opponent whereas a captured gold gives the opponent a relatively more valuable piece.

Kaufman notes that exchanging a promoted pawn for a real gold is often a good material gain tactic because the player with the promoted pawn loses only two points while his opponent loses seven.

Relative piece valuations are used to roughly evaluate piece exchanges. For example, if there is an opportunity to capture two golds from an opponent by giving up a rook and a pawn, using Kaufman's scheme, this is seem as a favorable trade (all else equal):

(gold + gold) > (rook + pawn)
(8 + 8) > (13 + 1)

However, this wouldn't be a good trade if the rook was promoted:

(gold + gold) < (dragon + pawn)
(8 + 8) < (17 + 1)

== Castles ==
Gold Fortress
☖ pieces in hand: –

9	8	7	6	5	4	3	2	1
									1
									2
									3
									4
									5
		歩	歩	歩					6
歩	歩	銀	金						7
	玉	金							8
香	桂								9

☗ pieces in hand: –
Mino
☖ pieces in hand: –

9	8	7	6	5	4	3	2	1
									1
									2
									3
									4
									5
								歩	6
					歩	歩	歩		7
				金		銀	玉		8
					金		桂	香	9

☗ pieces in hand: –

Ranging Rook Bear-in-the-hole
☖ pieces in hand: –

9	8	7	6	5	4	3	2	1
									1
									2
									3
									4
									5
									6
					歩	歩	歩	歩	7
						金	銀	香	8
						金	桂	玉	9

☗ pieces in hand: –

In shogi, strong defensive fortifications protecting the king are known as castles. There are many types of castles and variations which can be used, but it is essential to understand which ones are useful in the current situation and how to compensate for its weak points. Three commonly used castles are listed below.

The Fortress castle was considered by many to be the strongest defensive position in shogi in the 1980s. Although there are many variants, a common Fortress structure is the Gold Fortress. The Fortress opening, in which both players adopt Fortress castles, has a strongly protected king; a well-fortified line of pawns; and the bishop, rook, and a pawn all support a later attack by the rook's silver or knight. It is notoriously difficult to break down with a frontal assault although it is weaker from the side. It is typically used against Static Rook openings that involve advancing the rook's pawn. However, one's opponent may just as easily adopt this defense, giving neither side an advantage. The Fortress castle can also be used against Bishop-Exchange Ranging Rook opponents, and there is a variant of Fortress built on the right side of the board for use in Double Ranging Rook positions as well.

The Mino castle is a defensive position that is considered easier for beginners but still popular with professionals. The king is placed in a safe position, while the three generals back each other up. This is often used when a player chooses a Ranging Rook opening rather than a Static Rook opening. However, it is also relatively common for Static Rook variant of Mino built on the left side of the board for use against Static Rook or Ranging Rook opponents.

The Bear-in-the-hole castle is a third common castle often used in professional shogi. A player utilizing the Ranging Rook strategy uses a Ranging Rook Bear-in-the-hole on the right side. The result places the king in the corner square where the lance started, defended by two gold generals and one silver. This way, the king cannot be easily checked by a knight or a ranging piece.

== Sabaki ==
The Japanese noun sabaki (捌き) is a term of art used in shogi. The word means handling or management but its usage in shogi is nuanced and context dependent so it has been borrowed into English instead of being translated.

In the opening, sabaki usually simply means good piece development in preparation for the middle game.

However, in the middle game, it has a more nuanced meaning of developing pieces – especially major pieces (rook and bishop) – in ways such that they become fully activated with their attacking lines cleared for offensive purposes. In a shogi opening, piece development will often result in pieces being clustered together in cramped configurations. To achieve sabaki is to change the configuration by clearing off certain obstructing pieces via piece exchanges so that attacking pieces are dominant on the board with newly obtained freedom of movement. With respect to the major pieces, this is typically done by clearing off the bishop's diagonals and the rook's ranks and files. Although the term is associated with freeing pieces in cramped positions, it does not mean escaping from the cramped position in a successful defense. Rather the term refers to development for attacking.

In western chess, a similar concept is sometimes referred to as a freeing move or maneuver (such as a pawn break). However, in shogi, the concept of sabaki often involves multiple moves and multiple pieces. (cf. break and blocked position.)

=== Sabaki example 1 ===
Cramped Position
☖ pieces in hand: –

9	8	7	6	5	4	3	2	1
									1
									2
			歩		歩				3
			銀	歩					4
									5
			銀	歩					6
			歩		歩				7
				飛					8
									9

☗ pieces in hand: –
Sabakiing The Rook
☖ pieces in hand: –

9	8	7	6	5	4	3	2	1
									1
									2
			歩		歩				3
			銀	歩					4
				歩					5
			銀						6
			歩		歩				7
				飛					8
									9

☗ pieces in hand: –
1. P-55

Rook Sabaki Achieved
☖ pieces in hand: 銀 歩

9	8	7	6	5	4	3	2	1
									1
									2
			歩		歩				3
									4
				飛					5
									6
			歩		歩				7
									8
									9

☗ pieces in hand: 銀 歩
1... Px55

2. Sx55 Sx55

3. Rx55

For a basic example, in the adjacent diagrams, the rook positioned on the central file (as in Central Rook openings) is blocked by pawns and its potential movement is restricted by both players' silvers. In order to achieve sabaki, an attack is started on the central file with 1. P-55. White takes the pawn with subsequent captures by both silvers (1...Px55, 2. Sx55 Sx55, 3. Rx55). After the final capture of White's silver by Black's rook, the rook now has clear paths of attack (the entire middle rank and central file) including access to the promotion zone of White where the rook can promote into a dragon. Note that the central pawns and silvers were simply traded off the board and put in hand, there was no material gain or loss from this exchange in this simple example. Other examples may involve piece sacrifices in order to achieve sabaki.

== Opening ==
Bishop opening
☖ pieces in hand: –

9	8	7	6	5	4	3	2	1
香	桂	銀	金	王	金	銀	桂	香	1
	飛						角		2
歩	歩	歩	歩	歩	歩	歩	歩	歩	3
									4
									5
		歩							6
歩	歩		歩	歩	歩	歩	歩	歩	7
	角						飛		8
香	桂	銀	金	玉	金	銀	桂	香	9

☗ pieces in hand: –
1. P-76
Rook opening
☖ pieces in hand: –

9	8	7	6	5	4	3	2	1
香	桂	銀	金	王	金	銀	桂	香	1
	飛						角		2
歩	歩	歩	歩	歩	歩	歩	歩	歩	3
									4
									5
							歩		6
歩	歩	歩	歩	歩	歩	歩		歩	7
	角						飛		8
香	桂	銀	金	玉	金	銀	桂	香	9

☗ pieces in hand: –
1. P-26

The opening of shogi is generally slower than that of chess, due to the larger board and less mobile pieces. But since a quick offense will leave a player's home territory open to drop attacks as soon as pieces are exchanged, the aim of the opening is to build up defenses for the king, typically by moving the king to the side in a castle with three generals. Leaving a king on its original square (居玉 igyoku or "sitting king") may be a particularly dangerous position.

Ranging Rook vs Static Rook
☖ pieces in hand: –

9	8	7	6	5	4	3	2	1
香	桂		金		金	銀	桂		1
	飛		銀				王	香	2
歩		歩	歩		歩	角	歩	歩	3
				歩		歩			4
	歩								5
		歩	歩		歩	歩		歩	6
歩	歩	角	銀	歩			歩		7
			飛			銀			8
香	桂		金	玉	金		桂	香	9

☗ pieces in hand: –
Black is playing a Ranging Rook position (Fujii System) with an Incomplete Mino castle against White's Static Rook position attempting to build a Bear-in-the-hole castle.

Both players can move the rook pawn forward (P-26), or, more commonly, advance the pawn above and to the right of the bishop (P-76). The former is known as a rook opening and the latter a bishop opening.

With a bishop opening, it is common to trade bishops by having one capture the other. This allows each player to put their newly captured bishop into play anywhere on the board, although care must be taken to avoid weaknesses in defense which may allow for a bishop drop. However, it is not advantageous to trade bishops if your opponent has a better defensive setup, or more lines of attack. Moreover, making a bishop trade constitutes tempo loss, so it is not advised without a good reason.

Many common opening attacks involve advancing a silver and ideally pawns, protected by other pieces. Because silvers have more possibilities for retreat, while golds better defend their sides, silvers are generally considered superior as attacking pieces, and golds superior as defensive pieces. It is common practice to defend the king with three generals, two golds and a silver.

Because defense is so important, and because shogi pieces are relatively slow movers, the opening game tends to be much longer in shogi than in international chess, commonly with a dozen or more moves to shore up defenses before the initial attack is made.

Over many decades, Japanese professional players have all invented various jōseki, which determine moves and sequences which are thought to be the best for a particular situation. It also covers a branch of different variations within an intricate strategy, including alternative options and the certain consequences that some moves may bring.

Openings are also classified as Static Rook openings, where the offense is supported by the rook in its original position, and Ranging Rook openings, where the rook moves to the center or left of the board to support an attack there, typically with the idea of allowing the opponent to attack while arranging a better defense and aiming for a counterattack. However, as the most powerful piece on the board, the rook invites attack, and in most cases, especially for weaker players, it is a good idea to keep the king well away from the rook. Relatedly, the Static vs Ranging Rook classification corresponds to castle development: Static Rook positions tend to have castles on the left side of the board while Ranging Rook positions tend to have castles on the right side.

== Middle game ==
In the mid-game of shogi players have captured pieces which can then be dropped back on to the board. These drop moves are a significant part of shogi strategy and players often exchange or sacrifice pieces if necessary to get one.

Pawns tend to be lost early in the game because they attack head on, and cannot defend each other, so they are often used for such attacks. Dropping a pawn behind enemy lines, promoting it to a tokin (gold general), and dropping a second pawn immediately behind the tokin so that they protect each other makes a strong attack; it threatens the opponent's entire defense, but provides little value to the opponent if the attack fails and the pieces are captured.

Attacking pieces can also easily become trapped behind enemy lines by pawns dropped on a protected square to cut off the line of retreat. For this reason, rooks, which can retreat in only one direction, are commonly kept at a safe distance in the early parts of the game, and used to support attacks by weaker pieces. However, once the game has opened up, a promoted rook is an especially strong piece behind enemy lines.

== Endgame ==
The endgame begins with the collapse of one side's defense. Once a player has broken through the enemy lines, the opponent's king can be easily trapped by its own pieces. A common last-ditch defensive tactic is to open the pawn line to allow the king to escape. Kings are more difficult to checkmate in the open, especially if the opponent does not have many ranging pieces (rook, bishop, lance) in play.

In the endgame, it comes down to a race over who can checkmate the opponent first. A technique known as speed counting plays an important role in the endgame. By counting the number of moves until checkmate (assuming the opponent doesn't get to move) for both Black and White, this will help to influence decisions on whether to attack or defend. A simple mistake can change the flow of the game drastically. Among this, there are many other delicate factors to look out for within the endgame, including sacrificial attacks and traps.

A player's endgame play is strengthened by training on tsume shogi and brinkmate problems.

== See also ==
- Shogi opening
- Castle (shogi)
- Shogi tactics
- Tsume shogi
- Brinkmate

== Bibliography ==
- Aono, Teruichi (2009) [First published in 1983]. Better Moves for Better Shogi. Translated by Fairbairn, John (2nd ed.). Ishi Press. ISBN 978-4-87187-999-6.
- Fairbairn, John (1986). Shogi for beginners (2nd ed.). Ishi Press. ISBN 978-4-8718-720-10.
- Grimbergen, Reijer; Rollason, Jeff (2003). "Board Maps and Hill-Climbing for Opening and Middle-Game Play for Shogi". In Schaeffer, Jonathan; Müller, Martin; Björnsson, Yngvi (eds.). Computers and Games: Third International Conference, CG 2002, Edmonton, Canada, July 25–27, 2002, Revised Papers. Lecture Notes in Computer Science. Vol. 2883. Springer-Verlag. pp. 171–187. doi:10.1007/978-3-540-40031-8_12. ISBN 978-3-540-20545-6. ISSN 0302-9743 – via Google Books.
- Hosking, Tony (1996). The Art of Shogi. The Shogi Foundation. ISBN 978-0-95310-890-9.
- Leggett, Trevor (1993). Japanese Chess: The Game of Shogi. Tuttle Publishing.
- "Kyokumenpedia" 局面ペディア [Kyokumenpedia]. Kyokumenpedia (in Japanese). Team ISCube. 2016.: Many shogi games (professional, online, AI) put into a decision tree structure with user-generated commentary and references and some opening classifications.
- Nishio, Akira (2014). "4th-file rook vs. static rook (1)". Shogi Openings.
- Tanigawa, Koji [in Japanese] (1982). 将棋に勝つ考え方 (in Japanese). 池田書店. ISBN 978-4-26210-301-3.
