= Kazuharu Shoshi =

Japanese shogi and xiangqi player (born 1961)

- Native name: 所司和晴
- Born: October 23, 1961 (age 64)
- Hometown: Kōtō

Career
- Achieved professional status: June 27, 1985 (aged 23)
- Badge number: 172
- Rank: 8-dan
- Retired: May 2026 (aged 64)
- Teacher: Hirokichi Hirano (7-dan)
- Career record: 405–585 (.409)
- Notable students: Ayumu Matsuo; Akira Watanabe; Atsushi Miyata; Naohiro Ishida; Kentarō Ishii; Seiya Kondō; Takahiro Ōhashi; Kaori Uekawa; Manaka Inagawa; Mio Watanabe; Maho Isotani

Websites
- JSA profile page

Kazuharu Shoshi (所司 和晴, Shoshi Kazuharu; born October 23, 1961) is a retired Japanese professional shogi player who achieved the rank of 8-dan.

== Shogi professional ==
On April 1, 2026, the JSA announced Shoshi had met the conditions for mandatory retirement for "Free Class" players and his retirement would become official upon completion of his final scheduled game of the 2026–2027 shogi season. Shoshi's retirement became official upon losing to Akira Shima on May 13, 2026, in a 39th Ryūō Group 6 game. He finished his career with a record of 405 wins and 585 losses for a winning percentage of 0.409.

=== Promotion history ===
The promotion history for Shoshi is as follows:

- 5-kyū: 1978
- 1-dan: 1980
- 4-dan: June 27, 1985
- 5-dan: April 1, 1987
- 6-dan: October 29, 1992
- 7-dan: April 27, 2005
- 8-dan: April 1, 2026
- Retired: May 13, 2026

=== Awards and honors ===
Shoshi received the Japan Shogi Association's "25 Years Service Award" in 2010 for being an active professional for 25 years.

=== Publications ===
Shoshi has written several books on shogi, including a standard manual on shogi handicap opening theory.

- — (2000). Koma Ochi Jōseki 駒落ち定跡 [Handicap Shogi Openings] (in Japanese). Tokyo, Japan: Mainichi Communications. ISBN 4-8197-0209-2.

== Xiangqi ==
Shoshi also plays xiangqi representing Japan in world tournaments and won the first prize in 1999, 2003, 2007, and 2015 in the non-Chinese/Vietnamese category. He holds the rank of Federation Master.
