= Seiya Kondō =

Japanese shogi player (born 1996)

- Native name: 近藤誠也
- Born: July 25, 1996 (age 29)
- Hometown: Yachiyo, Chiba

Career
- Achieved professional status: October 1, 2015 (aged 19)
- Badge Number: 303
- Rank: 8-dan
- Teacher: Kazuharu Shoshi (7-dan)
- Tournaments won: 1
- Meijin class: A
- Ryūō class: 3

Websites
- JSA profile page

Seiya Kondō (近藤 誠也, Kondō Seiya; born July 25, 1996) is a Japanese professional shogi player ranked 8-dan.

== Early life, amateur shogi and apprentice professional ==
Seiya Kondō was born on July 25, 1996, in Yachiyo, Chiba. He learned shogi from his father. In 2007, he finished runner-up in the 32nd Elementary School Student Meijin Tournament as a fifth-grade elementary school student, and then later that same year entered the Japan Shogi Association's apprentice school as a student of shogi professional Kazuharu Shoshi at the rank of 6-kyū.

Kondō was promoted to the rank of 3-dan in October 2013. He obtained professional status and the rank of 4-dan on October 1, 2015, after finishing tied for first with Satoshi Takano in the 57th 3-dan League (April 2015 – September 2015) with a record of 13 wins and 5 losses.

== Shogi professional ==
In February 2025, Kondō won his first tournament as a professional when he defeated Akihiro Ida to win the 18th Asahi Cup Open tournament and its first prize of JPY 7,500,000.

=== Promotion history ===
The promotion history for Kondō is as follows:

- 6-kyū: September 2007
- 3-dan: October 2013
- 4-dan: October 1, 2015
- 5-dan: March 2, 2017
- 6-dan: March 5, 2019
- 7-dan: March 11, 2020
- 8-dan: January 16, 2025

=== Titles and other championships ===
Kondō has yet to appear in a major title match, but he has won one non-title tournament.

=== Year-end prize money and game fee ranking ===
Kondō has finished in the "Top 10" of the JSA's year-end prize money and game fee rankings once: fifth with JPY 23,880,000 in earnings in 2025.
