= Satoshi Takano =

Japanese shogi player

- Native name: 高野智史
- Born: October 27, 1993 (age 32)
- Hometown: Fujimi, Saitama

Career
- Achieved professional status: October 1, 2015 (aged 21)
- Badge number: 302
- Rank: 6-dan
- Teacher: Kazuki Kimura (9-dan)
- Tournaments won: 1
- Meijin class: C1
- Ryūō class: 3

Websites
- JSA profile page

Satoshi Takano (高野 智史, Takano Satoshi; born October 27, 1993) is a Japanese professional shogi player ranked 6-dan.

== Early life and apprenticeship ==
Takano was born in Fujimi, Saitama on October 27, 1993. He learned how to play shogi from his father when he was five years old.

At first, Takano only played shogi for fun, but over time became more and more serious about the game, including recording games between professionals as part of the NHK Cup TV Shogi Tournament for later study. He eventually grew bored playing against his elementary school classmates, and started attending a shogi school run by the local shogi association at a nearby community center where there were many strong players who were his age. When he was a fifth-grade elementary school student, he started attending a children's shogi school in Saitama City, where he met his future mentor shogi professional Kimura Kazuki for the first time, and was accepted into the Japan Shogi Association's apprentice school at the rank of 6-kyū as a student of Kimura when he was a junior high school eight-grade student in 2007.

Takano was promoted to the rank of 3-dan in 2013, and finally obtained professional status and the rank of 4-dan on October 1, 2015, after finishing tied for first with Seiya Kondō in the 57th 3-dan League (April 2015 – September 2015) with a record of 13 wins and 5 losses.

== Shogi professional ==
On October 28, 2019, Takano defeated Yasuhiro Masuda in Game 3 of the 50th Shinjin-Ō championship match to win the match 2 games to 1. Masuda had won the tournament the previous two years and was leading the match 1 game to none before Takano came back to win his first tournament as a professional.

=== Promotion history ===
The promotion history for Takano is as follows.

- 6-kyū: April 14, 2007
- 3-dan: October 2013
- 4-dan: October 1, 2015
- 5-dan: December 2, 2019
- 6-dan: October 1, 2021

=== Titles and other championships ===
Takano has yet to appear in a major title match, but he has won one non-major title shogi tournament.

== Personal life ==
After graduating from senior high school, Takano decided to continue his studies at Chuo University even though he was also an apprentice shogi professional. He was a little anxious about trying to do both things at first, but felt being a university student helped him to broaden his knowledge and learn more about society. He took a break from his studies during his final season of 3-dan league play, but resumed them after becoming a shogi professional. Takano is the fourth shogi professional to attend the university and the third to graduate.
