= Manaka Inagawa =

- Native name: 伊奈川愛菓
- Born: March 29, 1991 (age 34)
- Hometown: Kisarazu, Chiba Prefecture

Career
- Achieved professional status: October 1, 2006 (aged 15)
- Badge Number: W-36
- Rank: Women's 2-dan
- Teacher: Kazuharu Shoshi (7-dan)

Websites
- JSA profile page

Manaka Inagawa (伊奈川 愛菓, Inagawa Manaka; born March 29, 1991) is a Japanese women's professional shogi player ranked 2-dan. Inagawa is also a licensed physician.

== Women's shogi professional ==
=== Promotion history ===
Inagawa's promotion history is as follows:

- 2-kyū: October 1, 2006
- 1-kyū: April 1, 2008
- 1-dan: July 12, 2013
- 2-dan: April 6, 2021

Note: All ranks are women's professional ranks.
