= Shogi tactics =

Game concept

Many basic tactics (手筋 tesuji, also translated as 'clever move') of shogi are similar to those of chess tactics, involving forks, pins, removing the defender and other techniques, all of which are considered very strong when used effectively.

However, other tactics, particularly ones involving dropped pieces, have no parallel in western chess.

In general, shogi tactics are classified into two categories: (i) piece-related tesujis and (ii) opening/position-related tesujis.

== Fork ==
Fork by Black's Knight
☖ pieces in hand: –

| 9 | 8 | 7 | 6 | 5 | 4 | 3 | 2 | 1 |
| | | | | | | | | | 1 |
| | | | | | | | | | 2 |
| | | | | | | | | | 3 |
| | | | 王 | | 龍 | | | | 4 |
| | | | | | | | | | 5 |
| | | | | 桂 | | | | | 6 |
| | | | | | | | | | 7 |
| | | | | | | | | | 8 |
| | | | | | | | | | 9 |

☗ pieces in hand: –
Fork by Black's Silver
☖ pieces in hand: –

| 9 | 8 | 7 | 6 | 5 | 4 | 3 | 2 | 1 |
| | | | | 銀 | | | | | 1 |
| | | | 金 | | 金 | | | | 2 |
| | | | | | | | | | 3 |
| | | | | | | | | | 4 |
| | | | | | | | | | 5 |
| | | | | | | | | | 6 |
| | | | | | | | | | 7 |
| | | | | | | | | | 8 |
| | | | | | | | | | 9 |

☗ pieces in hand: –

Fork by Black's Gold
☖ pieces in hand: –

| 9 | 8 | 7 | 6 | 5 | 4 | 3 | 2 | 1 |
| | | | | | | | | | 1 |
| | | | | | | | | | 2 |
| | | | | | | 桂 | 金 | 歩 | 3 |
| | | | | | | | | | 4 |
| | | | | | | | | | 5 |
| | | | | | | | | | 6 |
| | | | | | | | | | 7 |
| | | | | | | | | | 8 |
| | | | | | | | | | 9 |

☗ pieces in hand: –
Fork by Black's Bishop
☖ pieces in hand: –

| 9 | 8 | 7 | 6 | 5 | 4 | 3 | 2 | 1 |
| | | | | 王 | | | | | 1 |
| | | | | | | | | | 2 |
| | | | | | | | | | 3 |
| | | | | | | | | | 4 |
| 角 | | | | | | | | | 5 |
| | 飛 | | | | | | | | 6 |
| | | | | | | | | | 7 |
| | | | | | | | | | 8 |
| | | | | | | | | | 9 |

☗ pieces in hand: –
Fork by Black's Rook
☖ pieces in hand: –

| 9 | 8 | 7 | 6 | 5 | 4 | 3 | 2 | 1 |
| | | | 飛 | | | 王 | | | 1 |
| | | | | | | | | | 2 |
| | | | 金 | | | | | | 3 |
| | | | | | | | | | 4 |
| | | | | | | | | | 5 |
| | | | | | | | | | 6 |
| | | | | | | | | | 7 |
| | | | | | | | | | 8 |
| | | | | | | | | | 9 |

☗ pieces in hand: –

A fork (両取り ryōtori) is a move that uses one piece to attack two or more of the opponent's pieces simultaneously, with the aim to achieve material advantage, since the opponent can counter only one of the threats. Forks can, of course, be made by moving a piece to the forking position or by dropping a piece to the forking position.

Some forks have specific names in Japanese. A silver forking two pieces from behind is 割り打ちの銀 wariuchi no gin "silver stabbing-in-the-back". A fork between a king and a rook is 王手飛車 (ōtebisha).

=== Game example ===
Habu vs Kimura
up to move 42
☖ pieces in hand: 歩歩

| 9 | 8 | 7 | 6 | 5 | 4 | 3 | 2 | 1 |
| 香 | 飛 | | | | | | 桂 | 香 | 1 |
| | | 銀 | 金 | 王 | | 金 | | | 2 |
| 歩 | | | 歩 | 歩 | 歩 | 角 | | 歩 | 3 |
| | | 歩 | | | | 銀 | 歩 | | 4 |
| | | 歩 | 桂 | | | | | | 5 |
| | | | | | | | 飛 | 歩 | 6 |
| 歩 | 歩 | | 歩 | 歩 | 歩 | 歩 | | | 7 |
| | 角 | 金 | | 玉 | 銀 | 金 | | | 8 |
| 香 | 桂 | 銀 | | | | | 桂 | 香 | 9 |

☗ pieces in hand: –
21. ...N-65

Habu vs Kimura
up to move 45
☖ pieces in hand: 角 歩歩

| 9 | 8 | 7 | 6 | 5 | 4 | 3 | 2 | 1 |
| 香 | 飛 | | | | | | | 香 | 1 |
| | | 銀 | 金 | 王 | | 金 | | | 2 |
| 歩 | | | 歩 | 歩 | 歩 | 桂 | | 歩 | 3 |
| | | 歩 | | | | 銀 | 歩 | | 4 |
| | | 歩 | 桂 | | | | | | 5 |
| | | | | 角 | | | 飛 | 歩 | 6 |
| 歩 | 歩 | | 歩 | 歩 | 歩 | 歩 | | | 7 |
| | | 金 | | 玉 | 銀 | 金 | | | 8 |
| 香 | 桂 | 銀 | | | | | 桂 | 香 | 9 |

☗ pieces in hand: –
22. Bx33+ Nx33
23. B*56

In the match (Side Pawn B-33 △K-52 opening) between Yoshiharu Habu and Kazuki Kimura on 2016 July 5, Habu had attacked Kimura's knight on 73 with a pawn drop on 74, and Kimura escaped the threat by moving the knight from 73 to 65 (see first adjacent diagram). Then, Habu executed a bishop trade in which Kimura recaptured with his left knight (22. Bx33+ Nx33). With a bishop in hand, Habu was then able to drop his bishop to the 56 square forking Kimura's undefended knight on 65 and undefended left silver on 34.

== Pin ==
'Bishop Pinning Pawn
Protecting Rook'
☖ pieces in hand: –

| 9 | 8 | 7 | 6 | 5 | 4 | 3 | 2 | 1 |
| | | | | | | | | | 1 |
| | | | | | | | | | 2 |
| | | | | | | | | | 3 |
| | | | | | | | | | 4 |
| | | | | 角 | | | | | 5 |
| | | | | | | | | | 6 |
| | | | | | | 歩 | | | 7 |
| | | | | | | | 飛 | | 8 |
| | | | | | | | | | 9 |

☗ pieces in hand: –

A pin (ピン pin) occurs when a defending piece that is attacked by a ranging piece cannot move without exposing a more valuable piece behind it. (Cf. also skewers.) In shogi, only lances, rooks (or dragons), and bishops (or horses) can pin an opponent's piece.

In the adjacent example, the Black's pawn at 37 is pinned by White's bishop because if the pawn were to advance to 36 then Black's rook would be captured by the bishop.

Rook Pinned to King by Bishop
☖ pieces in hand: –

| 9 | 8 | 7 | 6 | 5 | 4 | 3 | 2 | 1 |
| 香 | 桂 | 銀 | 金 | 王 | 金 | | | | 1 |
| | | | | | | | | | 2 |
| 歩 | | | 歩 | 歩 | 歩 | | | | 3 |
| | 飛 | 歩 | | | | | | | 4 |
| 角 | | | | | | | | | 5 |
| | | | | | | | | | 6 |
| | | | | | | | | | 7 |
| | | | | | | | | | 8 |
| | | | | | | | | | 9 |

☗ pieces in hand: –

The most powerful pins are ones involving a king, which causes the pinned piece to be absolutely immobile.

== Piece sacrifice ==
Piece sacrifices can be very useful in checkmating situations in order to force the king of one's opponent into mateable position. (See: Tsumeshogi§Piece sacrifice, cf. sacrifices in western chess.)

== Striking pawn ==
A striking pawn (叩きの歩/たたきの歩 tataki no fu) is the tactic of dropping a pawn directly in front of an opponent's piece immediately attacking it. The desired effect of this tactic is usually to force the opponent to move their pieces in a certain way in reaction to the threat of the striking pawn.

== Dangling pawn ==
Pawn in Hand
☖ pieces in hand: –

| 9 | 8 | 7 | 6 | 5 | 4 | 3 | 2 | 1 |
| | 桂 | | | | | | | | 1 |
| | | | | | | | | | 2 |
| | | | | | | | | | 3 |
| | | | | | | | | | 4 |
| | | | | | | | | | 5 |
| | | | | | | | | | 6 |
| | | | | | | | | | 7 |
| | | | | | | | | | 8 |
| | | | | | | | | | 9 |

☗ pieces in hand: 歩

Threat of Promotion
☖ pieces in hand: –

| 9 | 8 | 7 | 6 | 5 | 4 | 3 | 2 | 1 |
| | 桂 | | | | | | | | 1 |
| 歩 | | | | | | | | | 2 |
| | | | | | | | | | 3 |
| | | | | | | | | | 4 |
| | | | | | | | | | 5 |
| | | | | | | | | | 6 |
| | | | | | | | | | 7 |
| | | | | | | | | | 8 |
| | | | | | | | | | 9 |

☗ pieces in hand: –

| i. | P*92 |

Threat of Promotion
Realized
☖ pieces in hand: –

| 9 | 8 | 7 | 6 | 5 | 4 | 3 | 2 | 1 |
| と | 桂 | | | | | | | | 1 |
| | | | | | | | | | 2 |
| | | | | | | | | | 3 |
| | | | | | | | | | 4 |
| | | | | | | | | | 5 |
| | | | | | | | | | 6 |
| | | | | | | | | | 7 |
| | | | | | | | | | 8 |
| | | | | | | | | | 9 |

☗ pieces in hand: –

| i. | P*92 |
| ii. | P-91+ |

A dangling pawn or hanging pawn (垂れ歩/たれ歩 tarefu or 垂らし歩 tarashifu) is a pawn that is dropped in a position in which it can promote (to a と tokin) in the player's next move. (The act of dangling the pawn is 垂らし tarashi.)

Although dropping a dangling pawn may not be an immediate threat to an opponent, the later threat of promotion can be a greater danger.

Pawn Drop
☖ pieces in hand: –

| 9 | 8 | 7 | 6 | 5 | 4 | 3 | 2 | 1 |
| | | | | | | | 桂 | | 1 |
| | | | | | | 金 | 角 | | 2 |
| | | | | | 歩 | 歩 | 歩 | 歩 | 3 |
| | | | | | | | | | 4 |
| | | | | | | | | | 5 |
| | | | | | | | | | 6 |
| | | | | | | | | | 7 |
| | | | | | | | 飛 | | 8 |
| | | | | | | | | | 9 |

☗ pieces in hand: –
i. P*23

White's Response to P*23
☖ pieces in hand: –

| 9 | 8 | 7 | 6 | 5 | 4 | 3 | 2 | 1 |
| | | | | | | 角 | 桂 | | 1 |
| | | | | | | 金 | | | 2 |
| | | | | | 歩 | 歩 | 歩 | 歩 | 3 |
| | | | | | | | | | 4 |
| | | | | | | | | | 5 |
| | | | | | | | | | 6 |
| | | | | | | | | | 7 |
| | | | | | | | 飛 | | 8 |
| | | | | | | | | | 9 |

☗ pieces in hand: –
i. ...B-31

For example, in the diagrams below, Black is attempting to break through White's camp along the second file at 23 with a dropped pawn supported by a rook on 28. If Black drops the pawn on 23, White can retreat their bishop to 31 and since the pawn can only attack forward it does not threaten Black's gold on 32. In subsequent moves, Black cannot win the piece exchanges by promoting the pawn on rank 2 (P-22+) because White can start the attack and there are an equal number of pieces (gold and bishop vs pawn and rook).

Dangling Pawn Drop
☖ pieces in hand: –

| 9 | 8 | 7 | 6 | 5 | 4 | 3 | 2 | 1 |
| | | | | | | | 桂 | | 1 |
| | | | | | | 金 | 角 | | 2 |
| | | | | | 歩 | 歩 | | 歩 | 3 |
| | | | | | | | 歩 | | 4 |
| | | | | | | | | | 5 |
| | | | | | | | | | 6 |
| | | | | | | | | | 7 |
| | | | | | | | 飛 | | 8 |
| | | | | | | | | | 9 |

☗ pieces in hand: –
i. P*24

Dangling Pawn Promoted
☖ pieces in hand: –

| 9 | 8 | 7 | 6 | 5 | 4 | 3 | 2 | 1 |
| | | | | | | | 桂 | | 1 |
| | | | | | | 金 | 角 | | 2 |
| | | | | | 歩 | 歩 | と | 歩 | 3 |
| | | | | | | | | | 4 |
| | | | | | | | | | 5 |
| | | | | | | | | | 6 |
| | | | | | | | | | 7 |
| | | | | | | | 飛 | | 8 |
| | | | | | | | | | 9 |

☗ pieces in hand: –
i. P*24
ii. P-23+

In contrast, if Black drops a dangling pawn to 24 and White does nothing to prepare, when the pawn promotes at 23 both White's gold and bishop will be attacked by the tokin.

== Joining pawn ==
Pawn Attack on 23
☖ pieces in hand: –

| 9 | 8 | 7 | 6 | 5 | 4 | 3 | 2 | 1 |
| | | | | | | | | | 1 |
| | | | | | | | 玉 | | 2 |
| | | | | | | 歩 | 歩 | 歩 | 3 |
| | | | | | | | 歩 | | 4 |
| | | | | | | | | | 5 |
| | | | | | | | | | 6 |
| | | | | | | | | | 7 |
| | | | | | | | 飛 | | 8 |
| | | | | | | | | | 9 |

☗ pieces in hand: 歩歩
START
Pawn Capture
☖ pieces in hand: 歩

| 9 | 8 | 7 | 6 | 5 | 4 | 3 | 2 | 1 |
| | | | | | | | | | 1 |
| | | | | | | | 玉 | | 2 |
| | | | | | | 歩 | | 歩 | 3 |
| | | | | | | | 歩 | | 4 |
| | | | | | | | | | 5 |
| | | | | | | | | | 6 |
| | | | | | | | | | 7 |
| | | | | | | | 飛 | | 8 |
| | | | | | | | | | 9 |

☗ pieces in hand: 歩歩
i. ...Px24

Joining Pawn Drop
☖ pieces in hand: 歩

| 9 | 8 | 7 | 6 | 5 | 4 | 3 | 2 | 1 |
| | | | | | | | | | 1 |
| | | | | | | | 玉 | | 2 |
| | | | | | | 歩 | | 歩 | 3 |
| | | | | | | | 歩 | | 4 |
| | | | | | | | 歩 | | 5 |
| | | | | | | | | | 6 |
| | | | | | | | | | 7 |
| | | | | | | | 飛 | | 8 |
| | | | | | | | | | 9 |

☗ pieces in hand: 歩
ii. P*25
Pawn Lured Forward
☖ pieces in hand: 歩歩

| 9 | 8 | 7 | 6 | 5 | 4 | 3 | 2 | 1 |
| | | | | | | | | | 1 |
| | | | | | | | 玉 | | 2 |
| | | | | | | 歩 | | 歩 | 3 |
| | | | | | | | | | 4 |
| | | | | | | | 歩 | | 5 |
| | | | | | | | | | 6 |
| | | | | | | | | | 7 |
| | | | | | | | 飛 | | 8 |
| | | | | | | | | | 9 |

☗ pieces in hand: 歩
ii. ...Px25

A joining pawn (継ぎ歩 tsugifu) is a tactic in which a pawn is sacrificially dropped at the head of an opponent's pawn in order to lure the opponent's pawn forward.

In the example diagrams, Black attacks White's pawn on 23 by dropping a pawn on the 24 square leading White to capture Black's pawn. Then, Black plays the joining pawn tactic by dropping a second pawn to the 25 square forcing White's pawn to move to 25. Since White's pawn is now at 25, it cannot be used to protect White's camp on the second file. Furthermore, since White cannot drop a second pawn on the second file, their defense is much weaker.

Additionally, the moved pawn also gives Black an option of dropping a dangling pawn on 24, which cannot be immediately attacked by White. This joining pawn drop followed by dangling pawn drop sequence corresponds to a shogi aphorism (将棋の格言 shōgi no kakugen): 三歩あったら、継ぎ歩とたれ歩 sanpu attara tsugifu to tarefu "if you have three pawns, joining pawn and dangling pawn".

Joining pawn tactics may be useful in damaging the structure of an opponent's castle.

== Piece exchange and tempo loss ==
Black's Turn To Play
☖ pieces in hand: –

| 9 | 8 | 7 | 6 | 5 | 4 | 3 | 2 | 1 |
| | | | | | | 銀 | | | 1 |
| | | | | | | | 角 | | 2 |
| | | | | | | | | | 3 |
| | | | | | | | | | 4 |
| | | | | | | | | | 5 |
| | | | | | | | | | 6 |
| | | | | | | | | | 7 |
| | 角 | | | | | | | | 8 |
| | | 銀 | | | | | | | 9 |

☗ pieces in hand: –
START
Black's Tempo Loss
☖ pieces in hand: 角

| 9 | 8 | 7 | 6 | 5 | 4 | 3 | 2 | 1 |
| | | | | | | | | | 1 |
| | | | | | | | 銀 | | 2 |
| | | | | | | | | | 3 |
| | | | | | | | | | 4 |
| | | | | | | | | | 5 |
| | | | | | | | | | 6 |
| | | | | | | | | | 7 |
| | | | | | | | | | 8 |
| | | 銀 | | | | | | | 9 |

☗ pieces in hand: 角
i. Bx22 Sx22

When two pieces (usually identical) are captured by each side at the same coordinates, it is referred to as a trade or exchange. (Cf. exchanges in western chess.) Since captured pieces are never removed from play, a piece exchange has the effect of putting the exchanged pieces in hand and a turn sacrifice for the player who initiated the exchange. (See also: Tempo.)

For example, in the diagrams to the right, Black has decided to capture White's bishop on 22 with their bishop on the seventh file (Bx22). White responds by capturing Black's bishop with White's silver (Sx22). In comparing the start and end board positions of this bishop exchange, one can see that this is as if Black and White both removed each of their bishops from the board and put them each in hand and then Black skipped their turn allowing White to advance their silver to 22. For this reason, equal piece exchanges must weigh the pros and cons of losing tempo and gaining a piece in hand (all else being equal).

There is an opening known as Tempo Loss Bishop Exchange, which is so-named because White, who already is slower to position their pieces since they have second move, intentionally skips their turn via an especially early bishop trade. This puts White behind two moves. (Of course, there is a strategical tradeoff in this move which allows White to position their pieces in a way that isn't otherwise possible.)

== Generals ==
=== Function and mobility ===
Golds are usually used to defend whereas silvers are used to attack.

=== Dancing Pawns ===
Dancing Pawns
☖ pieces in hand: –

| 9 | 8 | 7 | 6 | 5 | 4 | 3 | 2 | 1 |
| | | | | | | 金 | | 香 | 1 |
| | | | | | | 金 | 角 | | 2 |
| | | | | | | 歩 | | | 3 |
| | | | | | | | 歩 | | 4 |
| | | | | | | 歩 | 銀 | | 5 |
| | | | | | | | | | 6 |
| | | | | | | | | | 7 |
| | | | | | | | | | 8 |
| | | | | | | | | | 9 |

☗ pieces in hand: 歩歩歩
START
Dancing Pawns
☖ pieces in hand: –

| 9 | 8 | 7 | 6 | 5 | 4 | 3 | 2 | 1 |
| | | | | | | 金 | | 香 | 1 |
| | | | | | | 金 | 角 | | 2 |
| | | | | | | 歩 | と | | 3 |
| | | | | | | | | | 4 |
| | | | | | | 歩 | 銀 | | 5 |
| | | | | | | | | | 6 |
| | | | | | | | | | 7 |
| | | | | | | | | | 8 |
| | | | | | | | | | 9 |

☗ pieces in hand: 歩歩歩
i. P-23+
Dancing Pawns
☖ pieces in hand: 歩

| 9 | 8 | 7 | 6 | 5 | 4 | 3 | 2 | 1 |
| | | | | | | 金 | | 香 | 1 |
| | | | | | | | 角 | | 2 |
| | | | | | | 歩 | 金 | | 3 |
| | | | | | | | | | 4 |
| | | | | | | 歩 | 銀 | | 5 |
| | | | | | | | | | 6 |
| | | | | | | | | | 7 |
| | | | | | | | | | 8 |
| | | | | | | | | | 9 |

☗ pieces in hand: 歩歩歩
i. ...Gx23

Dancing Pawns
☖ pieces in hand: 歩

| 9 | 8 | 7 | 6 | 5 | 4 | 3 | 2 | 1 |
| | | | | | | 金 | | 香 | 1 |
| | | | | | | | 角 | | 2 |
| | | | | | | 歩 | 金 | | 3 |
| | | | | | | | 歩 | | 4 |
| | | | | | | 歩 | 銀 | | 5 |
| | | | | | | | | | 6 |
| | | | | | | | | | 7 |
| | | | | | | | | | 8 |
| | | | | | | | | | 9 |

☗ pieces in hand: 歩歩
ii. P*24
Dancing Pawns
☖ pieces in hand: 歩

| 9 | 8 | 7 | 6 | 5 | 4 | 3 | 2 | 1 |
| | | | | | | 金 | | 香 | 1 |
| | | | | | | | 角 | | 2 |
| | | | | | | 歩 | | 金 | 3 |
| | | | | | | | 歩 | | 4 |
| | | | | | | 歩 | 銀 | | 5 |
| | | | | | | | | | 6 |
| | | | | | | | | | 7 |
| | | | | | | | | | 8 |
| | | | | | | | | | 9 |

☗ pieces in hand: 歩歩
ii. ...G-13
Dancing Pawns
☖ pieces in hand: 歩

| 9 | 8 | 7 | 6 | 5 | 4 | 3 | 2 | 1 |
| | | | | | | 金 | | 香 | 1 |
| | | | | | | | 角 | | 2 |
| | | | | | | 歩 | | 金 | 3 |
| | | | | | | | 歩 | 歩 | 4 |
| | | | | | | 歩 | 銀 | | 5 |
| | | | | | | | | | 6 |
| | | | | | | | | | 7 |
| | | | | | | | | | 8 |
| | | | | | | | | | 9 |

☗ pieces in hand: 歩
iii. P*14

Dancing Pawns
☖ pieces in hand: 歩

| 9 | 8 | 7 | 6 | 5 | 4 | 3 | 2 | 1 |
| | | | | | | 金 | | 香 | 1 |
| | | | | | | | 角 | 金 | 2 |
| | | | | | | 歩 | | | 3 |
| | | | | | | | 歩 | 歩 | 4 |
| | | | | | | 歩 | 銀 | | 5 |
| | | | | | | | | | 6 |
| | | | | | | | | | 7 |
| | | | | | | | | | 8 |
| | | | | | | | | | 9 |

☗ pieces in hand: 歩
iii. ...G-12

Dancing Pawns
☖ pieces in hand: 歩

| 9 | 8 | 7 | 6 | 5 | 4 | 3 | 2 | 1 |
| | | | | | | 金 | | 香 | 1 |
| | | | | | | | 角 | 金 | 2 |
| | | | | | | 歩 | と | | 3 |
| | | | | | | | | 歩 | 4 |
| | | | | | | 歩 | 銀 | | 5 |
| | | | | | | | | | 6 |
| | | | | | | | | | 7 |
| | | | | | | | | | 8 |
| | | | | | | | | | 9 |

☗ pieces in hand: 歩
iv. P-23+

Dancing Pawns
☖ pieces in hand: 歩歩

| 9 | 8 | 7 | 6 | 5 | 4 | 3 | 2 | 1 |
| | | | | | | 金 | | 香 | 1 |
| | | | | | | | 角 | | 2 |
| | | | | | | 歩 | 金 | | 3 |
| | | | | | | | 歩 | 歩 | 4 |
| | | | | | | 歩 | 銀 | | 5 |
| | | | | | | | | | 6 |
| | | | | | | | | | 7 |
| | | | | | | | | | 8 |
| | | | | | | | | | 9 |

☗ pieces in hand: –
iv. ...Gx23
v. P*24

Dancing Pawns (ダンスの歩 dansu no fu) is a pawn drop and pawn sacrifice tactic that exploits the limited piece movement of the gold.

The name comes from the way that the pawns cause the gold (or golds) to move around as if they were dancing in their futile attempt to escape capture.

== Edge attack ==
Pawn Drop Behind Lance
☖ pieces in hand: –

| 9 | 8 | 7 | 6 | 5 | 4 | 3 | 2 | 1 |
| | | | | | | | | 香 | 1 |
| | | | | | | | | | 2 |
| | | | | | | | | 歩 | 3 |
| | | | | | | | | | 4 |
| | | | | | | | | 歩 | 5 |
| | | | | | | | | | 6 |
| | | | | | | | | | 7 |
| | | | | | | | | | 8 |
| | | | | | | | | 香 | 9 |

☗ pieces in hand: 歩歩歩
START
Pawn Drop Behind Lance
☖ pieces in hand: –

| 9 | 8 | 7 | 6 | 5 | 4 | 3 | 2 | 1 |
| | | | | | | | | 香 | 1 |
| | | | | | | | | | 2 |
| | | | | | | | | 歩 | 3 |
| | | | | | | | | 歩 | 4 |
| | | | | | | | | | 5 |
| | | | | | | | | | 6 |
| | | | | | | | | | 7 |
| | | | | | | | | | 8 |
| | | | | | | | | 香 | 9 |

☗ pieces in hand: 歩歩歩
i. P-14

Pawn Drop Behind Lance
☖ pieces in hand: 歩

| 9 | 8 | 7 | 6 | 5 | 4 | 3 | 2 | 1 |
| | | | | | | | | 香 | 1 |
| | | | | | | | | 歩 | 2 |
| | | | | | | | | | 3 |
| | | | | | | | | 歩 | 4 |
| | | | | | | | | | 5 |
| | | | | | | | | | 6 |
| | | | | | | | | | 7 |
| | | | | | | | | | 8 |
| | | | | | | | | 香 | 9 |

☗ pieces in hand: 歩歩
i. ...Px14

ii. P*12

Pawn Drop Behind Lance
☖ pieces in hand: 歩歩歩

| 9 | 8 | 7 | 6 | 5 | 4 | 3 | 2 | 1 |
| | | | | | | | | | 1 |
| | | | | | | | | 歩 | 2 |
| | | | | | | | | 香 | 3 |
| | | | | | | | | 歩 | 4 |
| | | | | | | | | | 5 |
| | | | | | | | | | 6 |
| | | | | | | | | | 7 |
| | | | | | | | | | 8 |
| | | | | | | | | 香 | 9 |

☗ pieces in hand: –
ii. ...Lx12

iii. P*13 Lx13

iv. P*12

An edge attack (端攻め hashizeme) is an attack on the first or ninth files of an opponent's camp. This is a common tactic since there is a limit on the number of pieces that can protect the edge files.

One edge attack tactic is dropping a pawn behind an opponent's lance and threatening to promote it once the lance has been lured forward.

For instance, in the diagrams to the right, Black can move their first file pawn to 14 attacking White's pawn. Black's pawn will be sacrificed after White captures it leaving an open space on 13 for White's lance to move to in subsequent moves. After the pawn capture, Black can utilize their three pawns in hand by dropping a sequence of sacrificial pawns on the first file directly attacking White's lance. After White's lance is positioned on 13, Black can now drop a pawn behind lance and then promote it to a tokin on 11 later for use within White's camp.

== See also ==
- Shogi strategy

== Bibliography ==
- Hosking, Tony (1996). The art of shogi. The Shogi Foundation. ISBN 978-0-95310-890-9.
- Kitao, Madoka (2012). Edge attack at a glance. Translated by Kawasaki, Tomohide. Nekomado. ISBN 978-4-9052-2502-7.
- 週刊将棋編 (2006). ひと目の手筋. 毎日コミュニケーションズ. ISBN 978-4839921330.
- 将棋世界 (2016). 「次の一手」で覚える将棋基本手筋コレクション４３２. マイナビ出版. ISBN 978-4839960070.
