= Threefold repetition =

Chess rule

In chess, the threefold repetition rule states that a player may claim a draw if the same position occurs three times during the game. The rule is also known as repetition of position and, in the USCF rules, as triple occurrence of position. Two positions are by definition "the same" if pieces of the same type and color occupy the same squares, the same player has the move, the remaining castling rights are the same and the possibility to capture en passant is the same. The repeated positions need not occur in succession.

The game is not automatically drawn if a position occurs for the third time – one of the players, on their turn, must claim the draw with the arbiter. The claim must be made either before making the move which will produce the third repetition, or after the opponent has made a move producing a third repetition. By contrast, the fivefold repetition rule requires the arbiter to intervene and declare the game drawn if the same position occurs five times, needing no claim by the players.

Similar rules exist in other abstract strategy games such as xiangqi and shogi (cf. sennichite) whereas in Go, repetition of the immediately previous board position is completely disallowed in the first place, and in some regional rule sets repetition of any previous board position is disallowed.

Internet chess servers differ in their handling of draw by repetition. For example, Chess.com draws the game automatically upon a position's third occurrence.

== Statement of the rule ==
The relevant rules in the FIDE laws of chess are summarized as: (Note: Section 9.2 in FIDE Laws of Chess)

The game is a draw if a position occurs (at least) three times during the game. (Intervening moves do not matter.) It must be claimed by the player with the turn to move. The claim is made:

(a) If the position is about to appear for the third time, the player making the claim first writes their move on their scoresheet and notifies the arbiter that they intend to make this move.

or

(b) If the position has just appeared for the third time, the player with the move can claim the draw.

Positions are considered the same if
(1) the same player has the move,
(2) pieces of the same kind and color occupy the same squares, and
(3) the possible moves of all the pieces are the same.

Under (3) above, positions are not considered to be the same if:

(a) in the first position, a pawn could have been captured en passant (by the en passant rule, in the subsequent positions, the pawn cannot be captured en passant anymore), or
(b) either player has lost a right to castle, i.e. either king or one of the rooks has been moved, in between repetitions of the position.

Although a threefold repetition usually occurs after consecutive moves, there is no requirement that the moves be consecutive for a claim to be valid. The rule applies to positions, not moves.

Perpetual check is no longer specifically mentioned in the rules of chess; such a situation will eventually resolve to a draw either by repetition, fifty-move rule or (most commonly) by agreement.

If the claim for a draw is incorrect, the opponent is awarded an extra two minutes, the written move (if legal) must be played and the game continues. (Note: Rule 9.5.3 in FIDE Laws of Chess) Unreasonable claims may be penalized under rule 11.5, which forbids distracting or annoying the opponent. (Note: Rule 11.5 and 12.6 in FIDE Laws of Chess) Even if the claim is incorrect, any draw claim is also a draw offer that the opponent may accept. (Note: Rule 9.1.2.3 in FIDE Laws of Chess)

=== Fivefold repetition ===
In 2014 FIDE introduced a rule providing for a mandatory draw in the event of a fivefold repetition. If the same position occurs five times, then the game is immediately terminated as a draw. If an arbiter detects a fivefold repetition, they are required to intervene and declare the game a draw. If an arbiter does not detect a fivefold repetition or fails to intervene, a player may still make a claim for fivefold repetition. If the claim is verified, the game is declared a draw regardless of any subsequent moves or result, which are void. (Note: Rule 9.6.1 in FIDE Laws of Chess)

== Examples ==
=== 1972 World Championship ===
The seventeenth and eighteenth game of the 1972 World Championship match in Reykjavik between Bobby Fischer and Boris Spassky were declared draws because of threefold repetition. The twentieth game was drawn after an incorrect claim (see incorrect claims below).

=== Fischer vs. Petrosian, 1971 ===
Fischer vs. Petrosian, 1971

Position: a7 black pawn, b7 black pawn, f7 black pawn, h7 black king, c6 black pawn, f6 black queen, h6 black pawn, d5 black rook, f5 white pawn, f4 white rook, h3 white pawn, a2 white pawn, c2 white pawn, e2 white queen, f2 white pawn, h1 white king

Position after 30.Qe2, 32.Qe2 and 34.Qe2

In the third game of the 1971 Candidates Final Match in Buenos Aires between Bobby Fischer and Tigran Petrosian, Petrosian (with a better position) accidentally allowed the position after 30.Qe2 (see diagram) to be repeated three times. Play continued:

30... Qe5
31. Qh5 Qf6

31...Qxf4 32.Qxf7+ also leads to threefold repetition.

32. Qe2 (second time) Re5
33. Qd3 Rd5?

and then Fischer wrote his next move

34. Qe2 (third time) ½-½

on his scoresheet, which is the third appearance of the position with Black to move, and he claimed a draw. At first Petrosian was not aware of what was going on. Incidentally, this was the first time a draw by threefold repetition had been claimed in his career. This also illustrates that the intermediate moves do not need to be the same – just the positions.

=== Capablanca vs. Lasker, 1921 ===
Capablanca vs. Lasker, 1921

Position: f8 black king, a7 black pawn, f7 black pawn, b6 black pawn, e6 black queen, f5 white rook, g5 white queen, h5 black pawn, g4 black knight, e3 white pawn, a2 white pawn, b2 white pawn, g1 white king

Position after 34...h5, 36...Kf8 and 38...Kf8

As noted above, one of the players must claim a draw by threefold repetition for the rule to be applied, otherwise the game continues. In the fifth game of the 1921 World Chess Championship match in Havana between José Raúl Capablanca and Emanuel Lasker, the same position occurred three times, but no draw was claimed. After 34...h5 (see diagram), the moves were:

35. Qd8+ Kg7
36. Qg5+ Kf8 (second time)
37. Qd8+ Kg7
38. Qg5+ Kf8 (third time)

Capablanca had repeated the moves to gain time on the clock (i.e. get in some quick moves before time control). The game continued without a draw being claimed; Lasker blundered and resigned on move 46. (Capablanca went on to win the match and become world champion.)

=== Two games between Alekhine and Lasker, 1914 ===
Alekhine vs. Lasker
Moscow 1914

Position: a8 black rook, d8 black queen, f8 black rook, h8 black king, a7 black pawn, c7 black pawn, e7 black bishop, e6 black pawn, f6 black knight, g6 white queen, h6 black pawn, d5 black pawn, c3 white knight, d3 white bishop, a2 white pawn, b2 white pawn, c2 white pawn, f2 white pawn, g2 white pawn, h2 white pawn, a1 white rook, g1 white king

Position after 16.Qg6
Lasker vs. Alekhine
St. Petersburg 1914

Position: h8 black rook, c7 black pawn, e7 black bishop, f7 black pawn, g7 black pawn, h7 black pawn, c6 black pawn, e6 black king, c5 white pawn, e5 black knight, d4 white queen, e4 white knight, f3 black queen, a2 white pawn, b2 white pawn, f2 white pawn, h2 white pawn, a1 white rook, c1 white bishop, d1 white rook, g1 white king

Position after 21.Qd4, 23.Kg1 and 25.Kg1

The game between Alexander Alekhine and world champion Emanuel Lasker in Moscow 1914 ended in a short draw. After 16.Qg6 (see diagram) the players agreed to a draw because Alekhine can force the threefold repetition, for example 16...Qe8 17.Qxh6+ Kg8 18.Qg5+ Kh8 19.Qh6+.

In the first game between the two players in the St. Petersburg tournament 1914, Alekhine, this time with the black pieces, after 21.Qd4 (see diagram), forced a draw by threefold repetition using a similar process.

=== Portisch vs. Korchnoi, 1970 ===
Portisch vs. Korchnoi, 1970

Position: c8 black bishop, e8 black knight, f8 black rook, g8 black king, a7 black pawn, d7 black pawn, f7 black knight, g7 black pawn, h7 black pawn, e6 black pawn, b5 black queen, c5 white knight, f4 white pawn, a3 white pawn, g3 white pawn, b2 white pawn, f2 white queen, g2 white bishop, h2 white pawn, a1 white rook, e1 white king, h1 white rook

Position after 21...Qb5 with Portisch in a better position

A famous draw for threefold repetition occurred in the fourth (Note: "Lajos Portisch comments on the controversy surrounding his draw against Viktor Kortschnoi in their fourth and last game." per ChessBase article) game between Lajos Portisch and Viktor Korchnoi in Belgrade in the Russia (USSR) vs. Rest of the World 1970 match. After 21...Qb5 (see diagram), in a clearly better position, (Note: "22. Bf1 White steers for a repetition and a draw. Modern engines evaluate the position as clearly better for White." per ChessBase article) Portisch allowed this position to repeat three times and was criticized by teammate Bobby Fischer for allowing it. If Portisch had won the game, the match would have been a tie. Play continued:

22. Bf1 Qc6
23. Bg2 Qb5 (second time)
24. Bf1 Qc6
25. Bg2 ½-½

allowing Black to claim the threefold repetition with 25...Qb5.

=== Kasparov vs. Deep Blue, 1997 ===
Kasparov vs. Deep Blue, 1997

Position: a7 black pawn, b7 black pawn, g7 white pawn, b4 black king, c4 black pawn, f4 white knight, b3 black knight, e3 white rook, g3 white pawn, d2 black rook, b1 white king

Position after 49...Kb4

In the game between Garry Kasparov and Deep Blue in New York 1997, the game ended with a draw by agreement, because after 49...Kb4 (diagram), if White plays 50.g8=Q, Black can force perpetual check and claim a draw after 54.Kb1 by threefold repetition:

50...Rd1+
51.Ka2, Kb2 or Kc2 Rd2+
52.Kb1 (second time) Rd1+
53.Ka2, Kb2 or Kc2 Rd2+
54.Kb1 (third time)

=== Khamparia vs. Bo, 2018 ===
Khamparia vs. Bo, 2018

Position: a7 white pawn, b7 black king, f6 white pawn, b5 white king, d5 black pawn, h5 black pawn, d4 white bishop, e4 black pawn, h4 white pawn, e3 white pawn, c1 black rook

Position after 60...Rc1, 62...Rc1, 68...Rc1, 73...Rc1 and 75...Rc1

To detect fivefold repetitions can be challenging for the arbiter. In the game Akshat Khamparia vs. Li Bo, Budapest 2018, Li twice requested a draw, saying simply "repetition". Both times the request was rejected because it was not made correctly according to the threefold repetition rule. Li was later checkmated. Li disputed the result, indicating that the position had occurred five times. The arbiter was able to verify fivefold repetition at moves 60, 62, 68, 73 and 75. Had the fivefold repetition rule not been in effect, the result would have stood, as no correct claim for threefold repetition had been made. Under the fivefold repetition rule, however, the fifth occurrence of a position immediately terminates the game, and subsequent moves become irrelevant. The result was therefore overturned, and the game was declared a draw.

=== Opening line ===
Pirc Defense line

Position: a8 black rook, b8 black knight, d8 white knight, e8 black king, h8 black rook, a7 black pawn, b7 black pawn, e7 black pawn, h7 black pawn, d6 black pawn, g6 black pawn, b5 black bishop, c5 black pawn, d4 black bishop, f4 white pawn, g4 black knight, c3 white knight, a2 white pawn, b2 white pawn, c2 white pawn, g2 white pawn, h2 white pawn, a1 white rook, c1 white bishop, d1 white queen, e1 white king, h1 white rook

Position after 11.Nxd8

An Austrian Attack line from the Pirc Defence has been analyzed out to a draw by threefold repetition. After the moves 1.e4 d6 2.d4 Nf6 3.Nc3 g6 4.f4 Bg7 5.Nf3 c5 6.Bb5+ Bd7 7.e5 Ng4 8.e6 fxe6 9.Ng5 Bxb5! 10.Nxe6 Bxd4! 11.Nxd8 (diagram) Black can force perpetual check and so the draw by the following moves:

11...Bf2+
12.Kd2 (first time) Be3+
13.Ke1 Bf2+
14.Kd2 (second time) Be3+
15.Ke1 Bf2+
16.Kd2 (third time)

15...Bf2+ is only a twofold repetition, as White lost their castling right only after 12.Kd2. Threefold repetition will be in effect on the next occurrence of the position.

=== Grandmaster draws ===
Carlsen vs. Nakamura, 2021

Position: a8 black rook, b8 black knight, c8 black bishop, d8 black queen, f8 black bishop, g8 black knight, h8 black rook, a7 black pawn, b7 black pawn, c7 black pawn, d7 black pawn, e7 black king, f7 black pawn, g7 black pawn, h7 black pawn, e5 black pawn, e4 white pawn, a2 white pawn, b2 white pawn, c2 white pawn, d2 white pawn, e2 white king, f2 white pawn, g2 white pawn, h2 white pawn, a1 white rook, b1 white knight, c1 white bishop, d1 white queen, f1 white bishop, g1 white knight, h1 white rook

Position after 2...Ke7, 4...Ke7 and 6...Ke7

A grandmaster draw is characterised as a short draw between high-level players, typically intended to hold position without the expenditure of mental energy. As short draws by agreement are sometimes frowned upon or outright banned in tournaments, some players circumvent such rules by playing out lines known to end in threefold repetition draws. The Berlin draw in the Ruy Lopez is one of the more commonly used lines, while Magnus Carlsen and Hikaru Nakamura finished out a dead rubber at the Magnus Carlsen Invitational with a variation of the Bongcloud Attack – Nakamura admitted that with both players secure in passage to the next round of the tournament he saw no value in attempting to force the win.

== Repeating a position to gain time ==
Players sometimes repeat a position once not in order to draw, but to gain time on the clock (when an increment is being used) or to bring themselves closer to the time control (at which point they will receive more time). Occasionally, players miscount and inadvertently repeat the position more than once, thus allowing their opponent to claim a draw in an unfavourable position. The game between Ponomariov and Adams in Wijk aan Zee 2005 may have been an example of this.

== Incorrect claims ==
Even top players have made incorrect claims of a draw under this rule. The Karpov–Miles game is an example of the right to castle having to be the same in all positions. The Fischer–Spassky game is an example that it must be the same player's move in all three positions.

=== Karpov vs. Miles, 1986 ===
Karpov vs. Miles, 1986

Position: a8 black rook, e8 black king, f8 black bishop, h8 black rook, f7 black pawn, g7 black pawn, h7 black pawn, e6 black pawn, b5 white knight, e4 white pawn, a2 white pawn, b2 black knight, d2 white bishop, e2 white king, g2 white pawn, h2 white pawn, a1 white rook, h1 white rook

Position after 22.Nb5

The clause about the right to castle is a subtle but important one. In a game between grandmasters Anatoly Karpov and Tony Miles in Tilburg 1986, Karpov had less than five minutes remaining on his clock in which to finish a specified number of moves or forfeit the game. He claimed a draw by repetition after checking his scoresheet carefully, whereupon it was pointed out to him that in the first occurrence of position, Black's king had had the right to castle, whereas in the second and third it had not. Tournament rules stipulated that a player be penalized with three minutes of their time for incorrect claims, which left Karpov's flag on the verge of falling. By then, Miles had taken the draw. (Miles should have readily accepted a draw in that position, but Karpov was close to losing the game because of time control.) After 22.Nb5 (diagram), play continued:

22... Ra4 (Black loses queenside castling right)
23. Nc3 Ra8
24. Nb5 (first time only, Black lost queenside castling right) Ra4
25. Nc3 Ra8
26. Nb5 (second time only, Black lost queenside castling right) ½-½

Black was able to castle queenside the first time the arrangement of pieces in the diagram occurred, but not when the arrangement was repeated.

=== Fischer vs. Spassky, 1972 ===
Fischer vs. Spassky, 1972

Position: d6 black king, g6 black bishop, b5 black pawn, e5 black pawn, h5 black pawn, a4 black pawn, d4 black knight, g4 black pawn, a3 white pawn, c3 white king, e3 white knight, g3 white pawn, b2 white pawn, c2 white pawn, h2 white pawn, e1 white knight

Position after 48.Kc3, 50.Ne1 and 54...Nd4 (different turn)

In the twentieth game of the 1972 World Chess Championship between Bobby Fischer and Boris Spassky, Fischer called the arbiter Lothar Schmid to claim a draw because of threefold repetition. Spassky did not dispute it and signed the scoresheets before the arbiter ruled. After the draw had been agreed, it was pointed out that the position had occurred after White's 48th (see diagram) and 50th moves, and again after Black's 54th move. So the claim was actually invalid because it was not the same player's turn to move in all three instances, but the draw result stood.

=== Martínez Alcántara vs Sarana, 2025 ===
Martínez Alcántara vs. Sarana, 2025

Position: c8 black rook, e8 black king, f8 black bishop, h8 black rook, a7 black knight, b7 black pawn, e7 black pawn, f7 black pawn, g7 black pawn, h7 black pawn, b6 black knight, b5 black queen, e5 white knight, f5 black bishop, f4 white bishop, b3 white bishop, c3 white pawn, d3 black pawn, a2 white pawn, b2 white pawn, f2 white pawn, g2 white pawn, h2 white pawn, a1 white rook, d1 white queen, f1 white rook, g1 white king

Position after 14...., Qb5

Another curious case occurred in the Chess World Cup 2025. José Martínez Alcántara only needed a draw against Alexey Sarana to progress to the next round. He claimed a threefold repeat after that sequence:

15. Bxf7+ Kd8
16. Bb3 Ke8
17. Bf7+ Kd8
18. Bb3 Ke8
19. Bf7+

The arbiter rejected the claim and penalized Alcántara by adding three minutes to Sarana's clock. The key detail here is that, even after Bxf7, Black’s king is forced to move to d8; however, it has not yet lost the right to castle, which remains until it actually moves. In any case, the game lasted only two more moves and Alcántara advanced to the round of 16.

19 ... Kd8
20. Bb3 Ke8 draw

== History of the rule ==
Pest vs. Paris

Position: b8 black rook, f8 black rook, g8 black king, a7 black pawn, c7 black bishop, g7 black pawn, h7 black pawn, b6 black knight, c6 black pawn, c5 white knight, f5 black bishop, c4 black pawn, d4 white pawn, c3 white knight, a2 white pawn, b2 white pawn, e2 white rook, f2 white pawn, g2 white pawn, h2 white pawn, a1 white rook, c1 white bishop, g1 white king

Position after 19.Nc5, 21.Nc5, 23.Nc5, 25.Nc5 and 27.Nc5

The rule has been variously formulated at different times in chess history. In Tim Harding's MegaCorr database (a collection of correspondence chess games), the notes to a game between the cities of Pest and Paris played between 1842 and 1845 state that a sixfold repetition was necessary to claim a draw. The game went: 1.e4 e5 2.Nf3 Nf6 3.Nxe5 d6 4.Nf3 Nxe4 5.d4 d5 6.Bd3 Bd6 7.0-0 0-0 8.c4 Be6 9.Qc2 f5 10.Qb3 dxc4 11.Qxb7 c6 12.Bxe4 fxe4 13.Ng5 Bf5 14.Nc3 Qd7 15.Qxd7 Nxd7 16.Ngxe4 Bc7 17.Re1 Rab8 18.Re2 Nb6 19.Nc5 (see diagram)

19... Bd6
20. N5e4 Bc7
21. Nc5 (second time) Bd6
22. N5e4 Bc7
23. Nc5 (third time) Bd6
24. N5e4 Bc7
25. Nc5 (fourth time) Bd6
26. N5e4 Bc7
27. Nc5 (fifth time)

and now instead of taking the sixfold repetition draw with 27...Bd6 28.N5e4 Bc7, Paris diverged with 27...Bd3 and went on to lose the game.

The first use of such a rule was in a tournament in London in 1883, but was stated vaguely: "... if a series of moves be repeated three times the opponent can claim a draw." The rules for the first official World Chess Championship 1886 match between Wilhelm Steinitz and Johannes Zukertort stated: "... if both players repeat the same series of moves six times in succession, then either player may claim a draw." In two of the games the same position was repeated three times. The rule was modified soon afterward to be based on positions instead of moves, and for three repetitions. Draws by this method used to be uncommon.

The first edition of the FIDE rule from 1928 already defines the threefold repetition rule without considering castling and en passant capture rights. (Note: Par 15.C in FIDE Laws of Chess 1928 from "1931 - 1st FIDE Laws (BCF version)" on the Laws historic page of the CCA Britain.) To additionally consider castling and en passant capture rights was implicitly introduced in 1975 (Note: Article 12.3 in Fide Laws of Chess 1975 from "1975" of the Laws historic page of the CCAB) and explicitly worded in 1985. (Note: Article 10.5 (b) in Fide Laws of Chess 1985 from "1985" of the Laws historic page of the CCAB) Prior to that, a 1964 FIDE interpretation established the same.

=== Pillsbury vs. Burn, 1898 ===
Pillsbury vs. Burn, 1898

Position: f7 black pawn, g7 black king, b6 black pawn, g6 black pawn, a5 black pawn, e5 black pawn, h5 black pawn, a4 white pawn, h4 white pawn, b3 white pawn, e3 black queen, f3 white pawn, g3 white pawn, c2 white queen, g2 white king

Position after 42...Qe3, 46...Kg7 and 50...Kg7

In this 1898 Vienna tournament game between Harry Pillsbury and Amos Burn, the same position occurred three times, but no draw could be claimed under the rules at the time. The tournament was played under the rules of Bilguer's Handbuch des Schachspiels (1843, with later editions), in which the three-fold rule was stated as the repetition of moves or a sequence of moves, not a position. After 42...Qe3 (see diagram), the game continued:

43. Qb2 Kh6
44. Qc2 Kh7
45. Qb2 Kg8
46. Qc2 Kg7 (second time)
47. Qb2 Kh7
48. Qc2 Kh6
49. Qb2 Kh7
50. Qc2 Kg7 (third time)
51. Qb2

Under modern rules, Black could claim a draw by informing the arbiter of their intention to play 50...Kg7, producing the same position as had occurred after 42...Qe3 and 46...Kg7. Alternatively, after 51.Qb2, Black could claim a draw immediately because White has repeated the position after 43.Qb2 and 47.Qb2. Burn went on to win the game.

== Other games ==
In many abstract strategy games there are rules to cover repetition of position. In some games this results in a draw, in others it is forbidden to repeat a position.

Currently, shogi employs a fourfold repetition (千日手 sennichite) rule, which is required to end in a draw. Each player must have the same pieces in hand as well as the same position on the board. The result is a draw. However, a fourfold repetition with perpetual checks is illegal, and results not in a draw but in a loss by the checking player.

In Xiangqi, rules about repetitions vary between different sets of rules, but generally perpetual attacks (長打), including perpetual check, perpetual threatmate, and perpetual chase, are forbidden.

Arimaa does not allow threefold repetition of the same position with the same player to move.

In Go, a player may not make a move which repeats the previous position, as would occur if a player were to immediately recapture a stone in a ko situation. Creating ko threats is an important strategic consideration in Go.
