= Naohiro Ishida =

Japanese shogi player

- Native name: 石田直裕
- Born: December 5, 1988 (age 37)
- Hometown: Nayoro, Hokkaido, Japan

Career
- Achieved professional status: October 1, 2012 (aged 23)
- Badge number: 289
- Rank: 6-dan
- Teacher: Kazuharu Shoshi (7-dan)
- Tournaments won: 1
- Meijin class: C2
- Ryūō class: 4

Websites
- JSA profile page

Naohiro Ishida (石田 直裕, Ishida Naohiro; born December 5, 1988) is a Japanese professional shogi player ranked 6-dan.

== Early life and apprenticeship ==
Ishida was born in Nayoro, Hokkaido, on December 5, 1988. He learned how to play shogi at school with friends, and entered the Japan Shogi Association's apprentice school at the rank of 6-kyū as a student of shogi professional Kazuharu Shoshi in 2001.

Early on, Ishida remained in at home in Nayoro, living with his mother and commuting twice monthly to Tokyo by plane to participate in the apprentice school. He would attend junior high school during the week, leave school early the day before his schedule games, and fly to Tokyo where he was met by his father. who was stationed in Tokyo as a member of the Japanese Self Defense Forces. After Ishida finished his games, his father would take him to the airport for the return trip back to Hokkaido.

At first, Ishida found the apprentice school quite difficult and actually was demoted from 6-kyū to 7-kyū because of poor results; eventually, however, he started to perform better and obtained promotion to 5-kyū. After graduating from junior high school, he and his mother moved from Hokkaido to Tokyo and he enrolled in a local senior high school; he continued to perform well as an apprentice professional and was promoted to the rank of 2-dan by the time he was a third-year high school student. After graduating from senior high school, Ishida decided to continue his education at university to not only please his mother, who felt that further education would help his job prospects if he did not become a professional shogi player, but also because he was really interested in mathematics. He passed the entrance exam for the Department of Mathematics for the Faculty of Science and Engineering of Chuo University and began living on his own after his mother moved back to Nayoro.

Nishida was promoted to the rank of 3-dan in 2008 while he was a second-year university student, but was still ranked at 3-dan as he entered his final year of university. Being around his fellow fourth-year students who were already going on job interviews and participating in other job-hunting activities made him wonder if he would ever become a professional shogi player. His mother even said he could come back to Nayoro and look for work if he wanted to after graduation if he still had not obtained professional status, but he decided to continue at the apprentice school, He finally obtained full professional status and the rank of 4-dan in October 2012 after finishing second in the 51st 3-dan League (April 2012 – September 2012) with a record of 13 wins and 5 losses.

== Shogi professional ==
Ishida defeated Tetsuya Fujimori 2 games to none to win the 4th Kakogawa Seiryū Tournament in 2014 for his only tournament championship.

In 2016, Ishida advanced to the finals of the 47th Shinjin-Ō tournament, but was defeated by Yasuhiro Masuda 2 games to none.

=== Promotion history ===
The promotion history for Ishida is as follows:

- 6-kyū: September 2001
- 3-dan: October 2008
- 4-dan: October 1, 2012
- 5-dan: August 15, 2017
- 6-dan: July 18, 2024
- 7-dan: November 6, 2026

=== Titles and other championships ===
Ishida has yet to appear in a major title match, but he has won one non-major title championship.

=== Year-end prize money and game fee ranking ===
Ishida has finished in the "Top 10" of the JSA's year-end prize money and game fee rankings once: tenth with JPY 14,270,000 in earnings in 2025.

== Personal life ==
Ishida is a graduate of Chuo University; he is the fourth alumnus of the school to become a professional shogi player.
