= Kaori Uekawa =

Japanese shogi player (born 1974)

- Native name: 上川香織
- Born: July 30, 1974 (age 51)
- Hometown: Shimokamagari, Hiroshima

Career
- Achieved professional status: April 1, 1999 (aged 24)
- Badge number: JSA W-46; LPSA W-16
- Rank: Women's 2-dan
- Teacher: Kazuharu Shoshi (7-dan)

Websites
- LPSA profile page

Kaori Uekawa (上川 香織, Uekawa Kaori; born July 30, 1974) is a Japanese women's professional shogi player ranked 2-dan. She is a member of the Ladies Professional Shogi-players' Association of Japan.

== Women's shogi professional ==
=== Promotion history ===
Uekawa has been promoted as follows.

- Women's Professional Apprentice League: April 1995
- 2-kyū: April 1, 1999
- 1-kyū: November 30, 1999
- 1-dan: April 1, 2003
- 2-dan: December 10, 2015

Note: All ranks are women's professional ranks.

== Personal life ==
Uekawa married professional shogi player Ayumu Matsuo in April 2005, and Uekawa announced that she would be competing professionally under her married name. On December 1, 2014, however, the Ladies Professional Shogi-players' Association of Japan announced that Uekawa would no longer be competing under the name "Matsuo".
