= Brinkmate =

Type of position in shogi and related games

Brinkmate is the situation in which an unavoidable checkmate sequence will be created by the player's next move.

In shogi, brinkmate is known as hisshi (必至 "desperation, inevitability" or 必死 "sure kill"). Note that in shogi tsume is defined as strictly forced mate sequences with constant checks. The checkmating sequence itself (after the brinkmate) is known as a 詰め tsume.

Brinkmate differs from the situation in which a checkmate sequence is only being threatened to be created in the next move but is still avoidable if the opponent defends correctly. This situation is known as threatmate or, in Japanese, 詰めろ tsumero ("threatened mate"). Thus, brinkmate is an indefensible threatmate.

The only way to prevent a loss from a brinkmate is for the defender to not give their opponent a chance to actually create the checkmate sequence and instead initiate their own mating sequence (with constant checks) before their opponent's move. (Thus, a good exemplification of the saying the best defense is a good offense.)

Some brinkmates involve tsumes that needs two condition to be met in order to defend (e.g. two mates are threatened). The defending side could give a check and simultaneously meet one condition (which is only possible in shogi games and brinkmate problems involving two kings), and then satisfy the other condition.

Although the terms brinkmate and threatmate were coined to translate the Japanese terms in shogi, the concepts can equally be applied to western chess and other chess-like games. (See: §Western chess below.)

In xiangqi, threatmate (催殺 "to expedite mating", often abbreviated as 殺) and brinkmate (絕殺 "absolute (indefensible) threatmate") are also common terms.

== Shogi ==
=== Example 1 ===
Fig. 1.
(pre-)Hisshi problem
☖ pieces in hand: all the rest

9	8	7	6	5	4	3	2	1
香	桂								1
									2
王	銀	歩							3
歩	歩								4
									5
									6
									7
									8
									9

☗ pieces in hand: 金
Fig. 2.
Hisshi (answer)
☖ pieces in hand: all the rest

9	8	7	6	5	4	3	2	1
香	桂								1
									2
王		歩							3
歩	歩	全							4
									5
									6
									7
									8
									9

☗ pieces in hand: 金
1. S-74+

Figure 1 shows a classic hisshi (brinkmate) problem. Here, Black does not have a way to immediately checkmate White's king or to immediately create a tsume forced mating sequence. However, Black can create hisshi by moving and promoting their silver to the 74 square, that is 1. S-74+ (Fig. 2).

Fig. 3.
White's Response #1: Capture
☖ pieces in hand: all the rest

9	8	7	6	5	4	3	2	1
香	桂								1
									2
王									3
歩	歩	歩							4
									5
									6
									7
									8
									9

☗ pieces in hand: 金
1...Px74
Fig. 4.
Tsume #1 (1 move)
☖ pieces in hand: all the rest

9	8	7	6	5	4	3	2	1
香	桂								1
									2
王	金								3
歩	歩	歩							4
									5
									6
									7
									8
									9

☗ pieces in hand: –
2. G*83

From this position, Black is threatening to drop their gold in hand to 83 in their next move to render an immediate mate.

Even if White were to try to remove Black's promoted silver with ...Px74 (Fig. 3), this does nothing to prevent the simple mate in one with G*83 (Fig. 4).

Fig. 5.
White's Response #2: Defend
☖ pieces in hand: all the rest

9	8	7	6	5	4	3	2	1
香	桂								1
	金								2
王		歩							3
歩	歩	全							4
									5
									6
									7
									8
									9

☗ pieces in hand: 金
1...G*82
Fig. 6.
Tsume #2 (3 moves)
☖ pieces in hand: all the rest

9	8	7	6	5	4	3	2	1
香	桂								1
	金								2
王	金	歩							3
歩	歩	全							4
									5
									6
									7
									8
									9

☗ pieces in hand: –
2. G*83

White has two possible ways to attempt to defend against this threat.

But, since this is hisshi and not merely tsumero (threatmate), all attempts are futile as explained below. (Note: An exception could be if Black had their king on 34, then White could drop their bishop on 61 to check and simultaneously defend. When the black king is present, White might defend by chasing the king to a square where White could check and simultaneously defend) If White tries to defend the 83 square by dropping a defender (such as a gold) to 82 (Fig. 5), then Black can initiate a 3-move forced mating sequence starting from 2. G*83 (Fig. 6).

Subsequent moves are 2...Gx83, 3. +Sx83 (tsumi).

Fig. 7.
White's Response #3: Escape
☖ pieces in hand: all the rest

9	8	7	6	5	4	3	2	1
香	桂								1
	王								2
		歩							3
歩	歩	全							4
									5
									6
									7
									8
									9

☗ pieces in hand: 金
1...K-82
Fig. 8.
Tsume #3 (3 moves)
☖ pieces in hand: all the rest

9	8	7	6	5	4	3	2	1
香	桂								1
	王								2
	全	歩							3
歩	歩								4
									5
									6
									7
									8
									9

☗ pieces in hand: 金
2. +S-83

If White's king tries to flee to the 82 square (Fig. 7), then Black can initiate a 3-move mating sequence starting from 2. +S-83 (Fig. 8).

Subsequent moves are 2...K-71, 3. G*72 (tsumi).

Alternately, instead of 2. +S-83, Black could move P-83+ for another 3-move forced mating sequence, then 2...K-71, 3. G*72 (tsumi).

=== Example 2 ===
Fig. 9.
(pre-)Hisshi problem
☖ pieces in hand: all the rest

9	8	7	6	5	4	3	2	1
香	桂		金						1
	飛					王			2
歩				桂		歩			3
					歩				4
				歩		歩			5
									6
			歩						7
				角			香		8
									9

☗ pieces in hand: 銀銀金
Fig. 10.
Hisshi (answer)
☖ pieces in hand: all the rest

9	8	7	6	5	4	3	2	1
香	桂		金						1
	飛			銀		王			2
歩				桂		歩			3
					歩				4
				歩		歩			5
									6
			歩						7
				角			香		8
									9

☗ pieces in hand: 銀金
1. S*52

Figure 9 displays a hisshi problem based on a real shogi game. Here, again Black doesn't have an immediate mating sequence, since 1. B-14 K-42, 2. G*41 K-52 and the king escapes. But Black can create hisshi by preventing the king from going that way by dropping their silver to the 52 square, that is 1. S*52 (Fig. 10).

Fig. 11.
Response 1: Escape
☖ pieces in hand: all the rest

9	8	7	6	5	4	3	2	1
香	桂		金						1
	飛			銀	王				2
歩				桂		歩			3
					歩				4
				歩		歩			5
									6
			歩						7
				角			香		8
									9

☗ pieces in hand: 銀金
1...K-42
Fig. 12.
Tsume (3 moves)
☖ pieces in hand: all the rest

9	8	7	6	5	4	3	2	1
香	桂		金						1
	飛			銀	王				2
歩				桂	金	歩			3
					歩				4
				歩		歩			5
									6
			歩						7
				角			香		8
									9

☗ pieces in hand: 銀
2. G*43

Black has 8 threats: 2. S*41, 2, S*43, 2. G*43, 2. G*22, 2. S*21, 2. S*23, 2. G*23, and 2. B-14. There is no way to defend all of them with one piece, so White only has two good options to remove them. One way is to move the king to 42 (Fig. 11). But then, Black can drop his gold on the head of the king (2. G*43), and after 2...K-31, Black mates with 3. S-32 silver on the head mate.

Fig. 13.
Response 2: Capture the silver
☖ pieces in hand: all the rest

9	8	7	6	5	4	3	2	1
香	桂		金						1
				飛		王			2
歩				桂		歩			3
					歩				4
				歩		歩			5
									6
			歩						7
				角			香		8
									9

☗ pieces in hand: 銀金
1...Rx52 (or 1...Gx52)
Fig. 14.
Tsume (5 moves)
☖ pieces in hand: all the rest

9	8	7	6	5	4	3	2	1
香	桂		金						1
				飛		王			2
歩				桂		歩			3
					歩			角	4
				歩		歩			5
									6
			歩						7
							香		8
									9

☗ pieces in hand: 銀金
2. B-14

And if White takes the silver by the gold or rook, then the White king's escaping route to 52 is blocked. Therefore, the mate sequence is 2. B-14 K-42, 3. G*41 K-43, 4. S*54 (tsumi). Without the silver sacrifice to 52, White could escape to 52 after 2. G*41.

=== Hisshi vs tsumero ===
Tsumero only (not hisshi)
☖ pieces in hand: 金

9	8	7	6	5	4	3	2	1
香	王								1
									2
	金								3
									4
									5
									6
									7
									8
									9

☗ pieces in hand: 金
White to play
Hisshi (and tsumero)
☖ pieces in hand: 金

9	8	7	6	5	4	3	2	1
香	王								1
									2
	金	歩							3
									4
									5
									6
									7
									8
									9

☗ pieces in hand: 金
White to play

The first adjacent diagram has an example of tsumero (threatmate) that is not hisshi (brinkmate). It is now White's turn to play. Although Black has a possible checkmate in their next move by dropping their gold to the 82 square, White can defend against this by dropping a gold to 71 defending the 82 square. With this move, White has removed the threat of Black's tsumero. If Black dropped their gold to 82 now, then White would simply capture it and attack Black's other gold (that is, 1...G*71 2.G*82 Gx82).

In the second diagram, there is an additional pawn positioned on the 73 square. This difference gives Black hisshi (as well as tsumero). Any defense attempt by White (fleeing or dropping a defending piece) will fail. White's 1...G*71 will be met with 2.G*72 Gx72 3.Px72+ (mate). There are similar mate sequences if White tries 1...R*32 1...G*82, etc. Similarly, it is impossible for White's king to escape with 1...K-71.

=== Silver on the belly tactic ===
Hisshi
☖ pieces in hand: all the rest

9	8	7	6	5	4	3	2	1
香			馬						1
	王	銀							2
歩	歩	歩							3
									4
									5
									6
									7
									8
									9

☗ pieces in hand: –

1.	S*72

Mate Sequence if White defends 83
☖ pieces in hand: all the rest

9	8	7	6	5	4	3	2	1
香	銀	馬							1
王									2
歩	歩	歩							3
									4
									5
									6
	飛								7
									8
									9

☗ pieces in hand: –

1.	S*72	R*87
2.	+B-71	K-92
3.	S-81 (tsumi)

Silver on the belly (腹銀 haragin "belly-silver") is a basic brinkmate tactic in shogi. This tactic positions a silver (by moving there or by dropping) directly on either side of the opponent's king. The adjacent diagram shows a typical silver on the belly brinkmate. Here the silver is placed on the 72 square. There are two threatmates, Sx83 (either promoted and unpromoted) and +B-71, and White cannot defend both. For instance, if White moves 1...R-87, then 2.+B-71 will mate, and if White moves 1...B*53, then the 2.Sx83 (either promoted and unpromoted) is mate.

=== Defending a two king brinkmate ===
Example 1
☖ pieces in hand: all the rest

9	8	7	6	5	4	3	2	1
		王			銀				1
金				金					2
	歩	歩			歩				3
			歩						4
									5
									6
				歩	歩				7
					銀				8
				金	玉	銀			9

☗ pieces in hand: 金

1.	G*52

defense with Horse
☖ pieces in hand: all the rest

9	8	7	6	5	4	3	2	1
		王			銀				1
金		馬		金					2
	歩	歩			歩				3
			歩						4
									5
									6
				歩	歩				7
					銀	銀			8
				金	玉				9

☗ pieces in hand: 金

1.	G*52	B*27
2.	S-38	B-72+

In example 1, there is no way to directly stop the mate, the 61, 62, 81 and 82 squares all needs to be protected, which could only be done by a dragon or horse. But white doesn't have a dragon or horse on the board, but he can make one by checking on the first move by dropping his bishop on 27. After Black moves his silver to block the check, the bishop can promote to 72 and defend. After this, if black goes 3. P-63+, white can drop his second bishop on 85, forking the king and the promoted pawn, and then take the promoted pawn (whether the black king in on 49 or 58).

== Western chess ==
Brinkmates (hisshi) and threatmates (tsumero) are also found in western chess.

Position after Qh6!

Position: f8 black rook, g8 black king, f7 black pawn, h7 black pawn, f6 white pawn, g6 black pawn, h6 white queen

Black has no way to prevent Qg7#. This position is brinkmate (hisshi).
Position after Qf7!

Position: f8 white knight, h8 black king, f7 white queen, h7 black pawn, f6 black knight

Despite the fact that no matter what move is played, there will be a mate, this is not a brinkmate because this is not even a threatmate (tsumero). However, black is in zugzwang and must move either his knight allowing Qxh7# or his h-pawn allowing Ng6#.
Position after ...Qa3?

Position: g8 black bishop, h8 black king, e7 black rook, g7 black pawn, h7 black pawn, f6 black pawn, h5 white pawn, h4 white knight, a3 black queen, b3 white pawn, c3 black pawn, d3 white pawn, e3 black pawn, a2 white pawn, c2 white pawn, e2 white pawn, b1 white king, c1 white knight, d1 white queen, e1 white rook, h1 white rook

White has no way to avoid ...Qb2#, but white can play 1. Ng6+ hxg6 2. hxg6+ Bh7 3. Rxh7+ Kg8 4. Rh8+ Kxh8 5. Rh1+ Kg8 6. Rh8+ Kxh8 7. Qh1+ Kg8 8. Qh7+ Kf8 9. Qh8#
Position after Qh6

Position: g8 black king, h8 black knight, f7 black pawn, h7 black pawn, f6 white pawn, g6 black pawn, h6 white queen, g5 white pawn, h3 white pawn, f2 black queen, h1 white king

This is a brinkmate, but black has Qf1+ and Qf2+ to force a repetition draw. He can also play Qh2+, Qg1+, or Qg2+ to force a stalemate.
Position after Qh6

Position: e8 black rook, g8 black king, f7 black pawn, h7 black pawn, f6 white pawn, g6 black pawn, h6 white queen, c5 black bishop

This is a tsumero but not a hisshi. ...Bf8 stops Qg7#.
Position after Qh6!

Position: f8 black rook, g8 black king, f7 black pawn, h7 black pawn, f6 white pawn, g6 black pawn, h6 white queen, c5 black bishop

This is a tsumero and a hisshi. Black cannot play ...Bf8 to defend Qg7# because his rook is there. ...Bd4 doesn't help.
Brinkmate in 1

Position: f8 black rook, g8 black king, d7 black queen, f7 black pawn, g7 black pawn, h7 black pawn, f6 white bishop, g6 black knight, f5 white knight, f4 white queen

1. Qh6! brinkmate. If 1... gxh6, 2. Nxh6 is mate.
Brinkmate in 2

Position: f8 black rook, g8 black king, f7 black pawn, g7 black pawn, h7 black pawn, f6 white pawn, f4 white queen

1. Qg5! g6 2. Qh6 brinkmate.
Brinkmate in 3

Position: f8 black rook, g8 black king, a7 black queen, f7 black pawn, h7 black pawn, d6 white knight, f6 white pawn, g6 black pawn, c5 black pawn, e5 white pawn, a4 white pawn, f4 white rook, g4 white pawn, e3 white queen, f3 white pawn

1. Rb4!! Kh8 2. Qh6 Rg8 3. Rb8! brinkmate.

== See also ==
- Tsume shogi
- Checkmate

== Bibliography ==
- Fairbairn, John (1986). Shogi for beginners (2nd ed.). Ishi Press. ISBN 978-4-8718-720-10.
- Kitao, Madoka (2014). Ending attack at a glance. Translated by Kawasaki, Tomohide. Nekomado. ISBN 978-4-9052-2513-3.
