= Maho Isotani =

Japanese shogi player

- Native name: 礒谷真帆
- Born: March 22, 2002 (age 23)
- Hometown: Narashino, Chiba Prefecture

Career
- Achieved professional status: November 1, 2018 (aged 16)
- Badge Number: LPSA W-21
- Rank: Women's 1-dan
- Teacher: Kazuharu Shoshi (7-dan)

Websites
- LPSA profile page

Maho Isotani (礒谷 真帆, Isotani Maho; born March 22, 2002) is a Japanese women's professional shogi player ranked 1-dan. She is a member of the Ladies Professional Shogi-players' Association of Japan.

== Early life ==
Isotani was born on March 22, 2002, in Narashino, Chiba Prefecture. Her mother Mika and aunt Miki are retired women's professional shogi players.

== Promotion history ==
Isotani has been promoted as follows:

- 2-kyū: November 1, 2018
- 1-dan: November 20, 2018

Note: All ranks are women's professional ranks.
