= Kazuki Kimura =

Japanese shogi player (born 1973)

- Native name: 木村一基
- Born: June 23, 1973 (age 53)
- Hometown: Yotsukaidō

Career
- Achieved professional status: April 1, 1997 (aged 23)
- Badge number: 222
- Rank: 9-dan
- Teacher: Yūji Sase (Honorary 9-dan)
- Major titles won: 1
- Tournaments won: 2
- Meijin class: B2
- Ryūō class: 1
- Notable students: Satoshi Takano; Shōta Kunii; Ayumi Takenaka

Websites
- JSA profile page

Kazuki Kimura (木村 一基, Kimura Kazuki; born June 23, 1973) is a Japanese professional shogi player ranked 9-dan. He is a former Ōi title holder. He is also the oldest player to win a major title for the first time.

== Early life, amateur shogi and apprenticeship ==
Kimura was born in Yotsukaidō, Chiba Prefecture on June 23, 1973. He learned how to play shogi at a friend's house when he was in kindergarten, and started regularly going to a local shogi club when he was a second-grade elementary school student.

Kimura first met his future mentor shogi professional Yūji Sase when the two played a 2-piece handicap game. Kimura soon began taking lessons from Sase at his house, where he occasionally played practice games against Hiroe Nakai, who was another one of Sase's students. In 1985, he advanced to the quarterfinals of the 10th Elementary Student Meijin Tournament as sixth-grade elementary school student, and later that same year entered the Japan Shogi Association's apprentice school under the guidance of Sase.

At first, Kimura progressed fairly quickly and was promoted to the rank of 3-dan in the fall of 1990 when he was an eleventh-grade high school student, but it took more than six years before he was able to obtain professional status and the rank of 4-dan in April 1997.

== Shogi professional ==
Kimura became the 52nd shogi professional to reach 600 career wins on December 21, 2017.

In June 2019, Kimura defeated Yoshiharu Habu to earn the right to challenge Masayuki Toyoshima for the 60th Ōi title. In the title match against Toyoshima, Kimura lost the first two games before coming back to tie the score at two wins apiece. Toyoshima won Game 5 and needed just one more win to defend his title; Kimura, however, won the last two games to win the match 4 games to 3. The victory not only gave Kimura his first major title, but it also made him the oldest first time winner of a major title at the age of 46 years and 3 months, breaking the record of 37 years and 6 months set by Michio Ariyoshi in 1973.

In June–August 2020, Kimura was unable to defend his Ōi title against Sōta Fujii, losing the 61st Ōi title match 4 games to none.

In September–October 2021, Kimura challenged Takuya Nagase for the 69th Ōza title, but lost the match 3 games to 1.

=== Promotion history ===
The promotion history for Kimura is as follows:

- 6-kyū: 1985
- 1-dan: 1988
- 4-dan: April 1, 1997
- 5-dan: April 1, 1999
- 6-dan: December 17, 2001
- 7-dan: April 1, 2003
- 8-dan: April 1, 2007
- 9-dan: June 26, 2017

=== Titles and other championships ===
Kimura has appeared in a major title match nine times, and has won one title; he has also won two non-major-title championships during his career.

=== Awards and honors ===
Kimura has received a number of Japan Shogi Association Annual Shogi Awards throughout his career. He won the ""Best New Player" award for 1997–1998; the "Best Winning Percentage" award for 1998–1999; the "Best Winning Percentage", "Most Games Won" and "Most games Played" awards for 2000–2001; the "Fighting-spirit" award for 2008–2009; and, the “Special Award” for 2019.

=== Year-end prize money and game fee ranking ===
Kimura has finished in the "Top 10" of the JSA's year-end prize money and game fee rankings nine times since turning professional.

Year	Amount	Rank
2005	¥22,860,000	8th
2007	¥23,840,000	8th
2008	¥29,580,000	6th
2009	¥29,420,000	5th
2011	¥20,520,000	7th
2014	¥16,340,000	10th
2019	¥32,090,000	7th
2020	\23,380,000	8th
2021	\22,450,000	7th

- Note: All amounts are given in Japanese yen and include prize money and fees earned from official tournaments and games held from January 1 to December 31.
