= Tsume shogi =

Japanese chess problem

Classic Tsume Shogi Problem
☖ pieces in hand: 飛_{2}角金_{4}銀桂_{4}歩_{17}

9	8	7	6	5	4	3	2	1
			銀	王	銀				1
									2
				と					3
									4
							馬		5
									6
									7
									8
									9

☗ pieces in hand: 銀
Composer is unknown. The solution is 1. +B-52 2. S41x52 3. S*42 or 1. +B-52 2. S61x52 3. S*62. (Note: The pieces in the diagram are as follows: the attacking side has a silver general (S) (銀, gin) in hand, a promoted bishop (+B) (馬, uma) on 25, and a promoted pawn (と, to) on 53; The defending side has a king (玉, gyoku) on 51, a silver general (S) (銀, gin) on 41 and a silver general (S) (銀, gin) on 61. Captures are indicated by an "x" and piece drops are indicated by a "*". (See Shogi notation for full description of notation.))

Tsume shogi (詰将棋 or 詰め将棋, tsume shōgi) or tsume (詰め) is the Japanese term for a shogi miniature problem in which the goal is to checkmate the opponent's king. Tsume problems usually present a situation that might occur in a shogi game (although unrealistic artistic tsume shogi exists), and the solver must find out how to achieve checkmate. It is similar to a mate-in-n chess problem.

The term tsumi (詰み) means the state of checkmate itself. The verb form is tsumu (詰む) "to checkmate". (The related term tsumero 詰めろ refers to the slightly different concept of "threatmate". See: Hisshi.)

Tsume shogi problems are strictly forced mate problems with constant checks. They assume that the player is in brinkmate and that they will lose unless they can force a mate sequence with a check on every move. The situation simulates real shogi games in which the endgame is essentially a mutual mating race.

Note that the concept of stalemate as in western chess does not exist in shogi as it essentially does not occur.

Although not considered tsume shogi problems, there are two other related types of shogi puzzles:

- Hisshi (必至, brinkmate) puzzles – A type of checkmate-related problem in which the objective is to create a brinkmate, a position where checkmate becomes inevitable. Unlike tsume shogi, the solution may include one or more non-checking moves that ultimately lead to checkmate.
- Tsugi no itte (次の一手, best next move) puzzles – A non-checkmate problem in which the objective is to identify the best move or sequence of moves that provide an advantage. Such problems may involve the endgame, often approaching checkmate, but can also include opening and middlegame strategies.

== Rules ==
Tsume problems have set rules for how they must be constructed and completed. If the solver breaks any of the rules, he has not solved the problem correctly. If the composer breaks any rules, he has not constructed a tsume shogi.

- The attacking side is Black (先手, sente); meaning, he plays first.
- The attacking side's king is usually not present on the board. If it is, it is called a sōgyoku tsume shōgi (双玉詰将棋) problem.
- All of the attacking side's moves must be checks.
- White (the defender, gote, or the side with the king) must move in such a way to delay checkmate as long as possible. This also means that White should exhaust all of Black's piece(s) in hand if present.
- White has in hand all pieces not on the board or in the attacking side's hand (not counting Black's other king).
- White can drop any piece in hand to delay or prevent checkmate. Futile interposition, where dropping a piece does not change the situation, is not allowed. (This rule takes precedence over the delaying checkmate as long as possible rule.)
- Black cannot make a mate line longer than the number of moves given in the problem (assuming the problem's author correctly constructed the problem). For instance, a mate in 65 puzzle cannot be extended to a mate in 225.

== Purposes of tsume problems ==
Tsume problems can be used to fulfill one of two tasks: to train in shogi strategy or to be created as a work of art.

=== Shogi training ===
Tsume problems are considered very good training for playing shogi. They teach not only how to effectively checkmate the king but also to predict moves and plan out a long series of moves before achieving a goal. There are many websites and books dedicated to tsume problems for this purpose.

=== As a work of art ===
Many shogi players for centuries have created tsume problems with long and deliberate mating lines as artwork. They might consist of the pieces making geometric shapes, a theme which is used throughout the problem, the removal of all pieces on the board (called a Smoke Mate), or a set number of moves. One of the most famous tsume artists is Kanju Itou, who in 1755 wrote Shogi Zukou (将棋図巧), a famous collection of artistic tsume problems. The main tsume shogi prize in the shogi world is the "Kanju Prize".

== Tactics ==
=== Mating with gold ===
Gold in Hand
☖ pieces in hand: –

9	8	7	6	5	4	3	2	1
				王					1
									2
				歩					3
									4
									5
									6
									7
									8
									9

☗ pieces in hand: 金
Head-Gold Checkmate
☖ pieces in hand: –

9	8	7	6	5	4	3	2	1
				王					1
				金					2
				歩					3
									4
									5
									6
									7
									8
									9

☗ pieces in hand: –
i. G*5b

Gold in Hand
☖ pieces in hand: –

9	8	7	6	5	4	3	2	1
									1
									2
王									3
銀	歩								4
			角						5
									6
									7
									8
									9

☗ pieces in hand: 金
Bottom-Gold Checkmate
☖ pieces in hand: –

9	8	7	6	5	4	3	2	1
									1
金									2
王									3
銀	歩								4
			角						5
									6
									7
									8
									9

☗ pieces in hand: –
i. G*9b

Gold in Hand
☖ pieces in hand: –

9	8	7	6	5	4	3	2	1
									1
								王	2
							歩	歩	3
									4
									5
									6
									7
									8
									9

☗ pieces in hand: 金
Belly-Gold Checkmate
☖ pieces in hand: –

9	8	7	6	5	4	3	2	1
									1
							金	王	2
							歩	歩	3
									4
									5
									6
									7
									8
									9

☗ pieces in hand: –
i. G*2b

A common move in the endgame is to checkmate an opponent's king with gold drop when the position that the gold is dropped to is also defended by another piece.

Japanese has three terms for this depending on the position of the gold in relation to the king. A gold dropped directly in front of the king is 頭金 atamakin ("head-gold"). 尻金 shirikin ("buttocks-gold") is gold position directly behind the king, and 腹金 harakin ("belly-gold") is a gold placed on the side of the king.

Since many pieces (pawn, lance, knight, silver) can all promote to gold-like piece, checkmate by a gold is usual.

Because of the relative ease of mating with a gold compared to other pieces, it is often advantageous to keep a gold in hand during the endgame so that a mate with a dropped gold can be executed.

=== Mating and promotion ===
Silver Threatening Mate
☖ pieces in hand: –

9	8	7	6	5	4	3	2	1
				王					1
									2
				銀					3
									4
									5
									6
									7
									8
									9

☗ pieces in hand: 銀
Head-Silver Mate
☖ pieces in hand: –

9	8	7	6	5	4	3	2	1
				王					1
				銀					2
				銀					3
									4
									5
									6
									7
									8
									9

☗ pieces in hand: –
i. S-52+
Wrong piece behind: No Mate
☖ pieces in hand: –

9	8	7	6	5	4	3	2	1
				王					1
				銀					2
				歩					3
									4
									5
									6
									7
									8
									9

☗ pieces in hand: –
i. S-52=

Since mate by gold is a fundamental checkmate tactic in shogi, it is common for pieces to promote into a gold to deliver checkmate.

For instance, a silver defended by a pawn can mate at the head of a king but only if the pawn is promoted. (Note: An unpromoted silver could only mate a king in a similar position if there was another piece behind it that attacked along the sides of the silver such as another silver, a gold, a horse, or a dragon.) A silver protected by a pawn, lance or rook cannot attack the side squares (62, 42) leaving two escape routes for the king unless there is a knight behind the defender.

Knight Threatening Mate
☖ pieces in hand: –

9	8	7	6	5	4	3	2	1
						金	桂	香	1
							王		2
									3
							歩	歩	4
								桂	5
									6
									7
									8
									9

☗ pieces in hand: –
Promoted Knight Mate
☖ pieces in hand: –

9	8	7	6	5	4	3	2	1
						金	桂	香	1
							王		2
							圭		3
							歩	歩	4
									5
									6
									7
									8
									9

☗ pieces in hand: –
i. N-23+

As another example, a knight may mate a king if promoted to a gold as well (as shown in the diagrams to the right). If the knight didn't promote here, then there would be no checkmate.

Knight Threatening Mate
☖ pieces in hand: –

9	8	7	6	5	4	3	2	1
香	王	銀							1
									2
	馬								3
									4
	桂								5
									6
									7
									8
									9

☗ pieces in hand: –
Unpromoted Knight Mate
☖ pieces in hand: –

9	8	7	6	5	4	3	2	1
香	王	銀							1
									2
	馬	桂							3
									4
									5
									6
									7
									8
									9

☗ pieces in hand: –
i. N-73=
Promoted Knight: No Mate
☖ pieces in hand: –

9	8	7	6	5	4	3	2	1
香	王	銀							1
									2
	馬	圭							3
									4
									5
									6
									7
									8
									9

☗ pieces in hand: –
i. N-73+

==== Mating and unpromotion ====
In other situations, staying unpromoted can lead to a mate while promoting does not result in mate.

In the example, if the knight on 85 moves to 73 and does not promote, it attacks the king and delivers checkmate (since the horse is also attacking the rank 2 squares in front of the king). However, if the knight moved to 73 and promoted to the gold-like narikeima, then the promoted knight isn't attacking the king leaving White a chance to counterattack to avoid checkmate.

Silver Threatening Mate
☖ pieces in hand: –

9	8	7	6	5	4	3	2	1
									1
									2
桂									3
王		銀							4
歩									5
	飛								6
									7
									8
									9

☗ pieces in hand: –
Unpromoted Silver Mate
☖ pieces in hand: –

9	8	7	6	5	4	3	2	1
									1
									2
桂	銀								3
王									4
歩									5
	飛								6
									7
									8
									9

☗ pieces in hand: –
i. S-83=

The same is true with the silver example to the right. If the silver promoted at 83, then it would not be checkmate since a gold-like promoted silver cannot attack diagonally backward.

=== Piece sacrifice ===
Sacrificial Drop
☖ pieces in hand: all the rest

9	8	7	6	5	4	3	2	1
	王								1
		角							2
	歩								3
									4
									5
									6
									7
									8
									9

☗ pieces in hand: 飛 角
Sacrificial Drop
☖ pieces in hand: all the rest

9	8	7	6	5	4	3	2	1
飛	王								1
		角							2
	歩								3
									4
									5
									6
									7
									8
									9

☗ pieces in hand: 角
i. R*11

King Captures
☖ pieces in hand: all the rest

9	8	7	6	5	4	3	2	1
王									1
		角							2
	歩								3
									4
									5
									6
									7
									8
									9

☗ pieces in hand: 角
i. ...Kx91
Mate with Bishop Drop
☖ pieces in hand: all the rest

9	8	7	6	5	4	3	2	1
王									1
		角							2
	歩	角							3
									4
									5
									6
									7
									8
									9

☗ pieces in hand: –
ii. B*73

Trying to Flee
☖ pieces in hand: all the rest

9	8	7	6	5	4	3	2	1
									1
王	馬	角							2
	歩								3
									4
									5
									6
									7
									8
									9

☗ pieces in hand: –
ii. ...K-92, iii. B-82+ (mate)

It is common in shogi to sacrifice pieces – that is, attacking with the expectation that the attacking piece will be immediately captured – in order to check the king forcing the king to move to a checkmateable position. Since shogi utilizes piece drops, dropped piece sacrifices are especially useful in checkmating patterns.

In this 5-move mate example, Black can execute a 3-move mate sequence if the White's king were positioned on the 91 square. Therefore, in order to get White to move their king to that position, Black drops his rook to the 91 square in a sacrifice move. Since White is now in check and without any safe square for an escape, White must capture the rook with his king.

Now, with the king on 91, Black can check the king with a bishop drop to 73.

Now the White's king is trapped. If the king tries to flee down the ninth file to 92, then Black will simply promote their bishop on the 82 square mating the king. The same applies to fleeing to across rank 1 (...K-81, B-82+) or attempting to drop a defending piece between the king and the bishop (...G*82, Bx82+).

== Fast checkmates ==
Blunder
☖ pieces in hand: 歩

9	8	7	6	5	4	3	2	1
香	桂		金	王	金	銀	桂	香	1
	飛		銀				角		2
歩		歩	歩		歩	歩	歩	歩	3
									4
	歩			角					5
		歩							6
歩	歩		歩		歩	歩	歩	歩	7
				飛					8
香	桂	銀	金	玉	金	銀	桂	香	9

☗ pieces in hand: 歩
Mate
☖ pieces in hand: 歩

9	8	7	6	5	4	3	2	1
香	桂		金	王	金	銀	桂	香	1
	飛		銀				角		2
歩		歩	歩		歩	馬	歩	歩	3
									4
	歩								5
		歩							6
歩	歩		歩		歩	歩	歩	歩	7
				飛					8
香	桂	銀	金	玉	金	銀	桂	香	9

☗ pieces in hand: 歩歩

Like the famous Scholar's mate in western chess, shogi has a well-known early mate sequence related to the joseki for Cheerful Central Rook vs Static Rook games.

For instance, if Black is playing Cheerful Central Rook, then if White deviates from the jouseki and blunders by creating a wall with either of their silvers (S-62 or S-42), then Black will give a double check with their rook and promoted bishop rendering an 11-move mate as follows:

1.	P-76	P-84
2.	P-56	P-54
3.	R-58	P-85
4.	P-55	Px55
5.	Bx55	S-62?
6.	Bx33!

Similar Mate
☖ pieces in hand: 歩

9	8	7	6	5	4	3	2	1
香	桂		金	王	金	銀	桂	香	1
	飛		銀				角		2
歩		歩	歩		歩	馬	歩	歩	3
	歩					歩			4
									5
		歩							6
歩	歩		歩		歩	歩	歩	歩	7
				飛					8
香	桂	銀	金	玉	金	銀	桂	香	9

☗ pieces in hand: 歩

Similar variants of this sequence are also possible. For example, Kitao (2011) offers the following position with these implied moves:

1.	P-76	P-84
2.	P-56	P-54
3.	R-58	S-62
4.	P-55	Px55
5.	Bx55	P-34?
6.	Bx33!

=== Fastest shogi checkmate ===
Fastest shogi checkmate
☖ pieces in hand:

9	8	7	6	5	4	3	2	1
香	桂	銀		王	金	銀	桂	香	1
	飛	金					角		2
歩	歩	歩	歩	歩	歩	歩	歩	歩	3
									4
									5
		歩							6
歩	歩		歩	歩	歩	歩	歩	歩	7
	角						飛		8
香	桂	銀	金	玉	金	銀	桂	香	9

☗ pieces in hand:
1. P-76 G-72
Fastest shogi checkmate
☖ pieces in hand:

9	8	7	6	5	4	3	2	1
香	桂	銀		王		銀	桂	香	1
	飛	金			金		角		2
歩	歩	歩	歩	歩	歩	馬	歩	歩	3
									4
									5
		歩							6
歩	歩		歩	歩	歩	歩	歩	歩	7
							飛		8
香	桂	銀	金	玉	金	銀	桂	香	9

☗ pieces in hand: 歩
2. Bx33+ G-42

Fastest shogi checkmate
☖ pieces in hand:

9	8	7	6	5	4	3	2	1
香	桂	銀	王			銀	桂	香	1
	飛	金			馬		角		2
歩	歩	歩	歩	歩	歩		歩	歩	3
									4
									5
		歩							6
歩	歩		歩	歩	歩	歩	歩	歩	7
							飛		8
香	桂	銀	金	玉	金	銀	桂	香	9

☗ pieces in hand: 金歩
3. +Bx42 K-61
Fastest shogi checkmate
☖ pieces in hand:

9	8	7	6	5	4	3	2	1
香	桂	銀	王			銀	桂	香	1
	飛	金		金	馬		角		2
歩	歩	歩	歩	歩	歩		歩	歩	3
									4
									5
		歩							6
歩	歩		歩	歩	歩	歩	歩	歩	7
							飛		8
香	桂	銀	金	玉	金	銀	桂	香	9

☗ pieces in hand: 歩
4. G*52 (tsumi)

In a sense, this a fairly unlikely mate sequence (cf. the Fool's mate in western chess).

1. P-76. Black's bishop diagonal is opened.

1...G-72. An unusual move early made by White. In the current configuration, the gold is stacked on top of the right silver creating a wall blocking White's king from fleeing rightward past the central file.

2. Bx33+?? A very bad blunder. Black trades his bishop for merely a pawn and promotes. Although the promoted bishop is checking White's king, it's meaningless. The game is now strongly in White's favor.

2...G-42?? An equally bad move by White. Although moving the left gold up does resolve Black's check, this allows Black's promoted bishop to simply retreat to its original place, escaping material loss (although White can capture the retreating bishop with 3. Bx88+, Black can capture back with 3...Sx88, ending up to be a bishop exchange). The better natural move here would be for White to simply capture Black's promoted bishop with their own bishop (2...Bx33). The game now has swung back and favors Black slightly.

3. +Bx42? Black captures the gold. While trading the bishop with a gold is necessary sometimes, it is not the case here. White's favor again.

3...K-61?? White's king runs from the promoted bishop. This is the losing blunder. Instead, the only good moves here are for the king or the left silver to capture the promoted bishop (3...Kx42 or 3...Sx42).

4. G*52. Dropping the gold on the 52 square gives checkmate.

If White had not created the wall structure with the gold and silver stacked on 72 and 71, respectively, White's king could have moved rightward or, even better, the gold in its starting position on 61 could have defended the 52 square.

== See also ==
- Hisshi
- Shogi strategy

== Bibliography ==
- Aono, Teruichi (2009) [First published in 1983]. Better Moves for Better Shogi. Translated by Fairbairn, John (2nd ed.). Ishi Press. ISBN 978-4-87187-999-6.
- Davis, T Gene (2011). Tsume puzzles for Japanese chess: Introduction to shogi mating riddles.
- Fairbairn, John (1986). Shogi for beginners (2nd ed.). Ishi Press. ISBN 978-4-8718-720-10.
- Hosking, Tony (1997). The art of shogi. The Shogi Foundation. ISBN 978-0-95310-890-9.
- Kitao, Madoka (2011). Joseki at a glance. Translated by Kawasaki, Tomohide. Nekomado. ISBN 978-4-9052-2501-0.
- Kitao, Madoka (2014). Ending attack at a glance. Translated by Kawasaki, Tomohide. Nekomado. ISBN 978-4-9052-2513-3.
- Leggett, Trevor (1993). Japanese chess: The game of shogi. Tuttle Publishing.
- 村山慈明の知って得する序盤術 [Murayama Yoshiaki's Early Game Skills to Know]. NHK将棋講座 (NHK Shogi Kōza) (in Japanese). 2016.
