= London Hearts =

- Genre: Variety
- Directed by: Rinzo Kaji, Ken Asakura
- Presented by: London Boots Ichi-gō Ni-gō (Atsushi Tamura and Ryō Tamura)
- Starring: London Boots Ichi-gō Ni-gō (Atsushi Tamura and Ryō Tamura) and many others
- Opening theme: Do You Remember Rock'N'Roll Radio? by Ramones
- Country of origin: Japan
- Original language: Japanese

Production
- Executive producer: Rinzo Kaji
- Producers: Shigeki Yamoka, Kou Ishimizu
- Running time: 60 minutes
- Production company: TV Asahi

Original release
- Network: ANN (TV Asahi)
- Release: April 18, 1999 – present

London Hearts Friday (金曜★ロンドンハーツ, Kin'yō Rondon Hātsu), formerly known as London Hearts (ロンドンハーツ, Rondon Hātsu) and Inazuma! London Hearts (イナズマ! ロンドンハーツ, Inazuma! Rondon Hātsu), is a Japanese variety television show hosted by London Boots Ichi-go Ni-go and Hiroiki Ariyoshi on TV Asahi. It focuses on creating comedy by taking Japanese comedians and television personalities out of their normal broadcast environments, often by ranking them from best to worst in a specific category or in expensive, elaborate candid camera pranks. In the past it featured ordinary members of the public being set up in edgy stunts, often using actors and hidden cameras.

The show was ranked as the number one "TV program I don't want to show to my children" by the All Japan PTA (parent-teacher association) for nine continuous years from 2004 to 2012.

== Cast ==
=== MCs ===
- London Boots Ichi-gō Ni-gō

- Atsushi Tamura
- Ryo Tamura (currently on suspension since June 25, 2019 due to the 2019 Yoshimoto scandal)

=== Frequent Regulars ===
==== Females ====
- Yoko Kumada
- Kayoko Okubo
- Sayaka Isoyama
- Harisenbon
- Emiri Henmi
- Nana Suzuki
- Nicole Fujita
- Nagiko Toono
- Shouko
- Nao Asahi
- Yukipoyo
- Michopa
- Akane Hotta

==== Males ====
- Hiroiki Ariyoshi
- Hironari Yamazaki (Untouchable)
- Toshifumi Fujiwara (FUJIWARA)
- Eiko Kano
- Chihara Junior (Chihara Kyodai)
- Cunning Takeyama
- Shinji Saito (Jungle Pocket)
- Kenji Murakami (Fruit Punch)
- Terumoto Goto (Football Hour)
- Takushi Tanaka (Ungirls)
- Hiroaki Ogi (Ogi Yahagi)
- Yoshimi Tokui (Tutorial)
- Muga Tsukaji (Drunk Dragon)
- Tetsuro Degawa
- Tomonori Jinnai
- Unjash

- Ken Watabe
- Kazuya Kojima

- Daikichi Hakata (Hanamaru・Daikichi Hakata)
- Hiromi
- Takashi Yoshimura (Heisei Nobushi Kobushi)
- Chidori

- Daigo
- Nobu

- Kazlaser (Maple Chogokin)
- Miyazon (Anzen Manzai)
- Hironobu Komiya (Sanshiro)
- Viking

- Eiji Kotoge
- Mizuki Nishimura

- Nadal (Colocolo Chikichiki Peppers)

=== Regular announcers ===
All announcers on the show are from TV Asahi.

- Yoshie Takeuchi
- Mai Shimamoto
- Youko Mori
- Ayaka Hironaka
- Natsumi Uga

=== Past appearances ===
- Sayaka Aoki
- Kaoru Sugita
- Sayuri Kokusho
- Noriko Aota
- Rinka
- Ai Iijima
- Sarina Suzuki
- Aya Sugimoto
- Moe Yamaguchi
- Yu Abiru
- Kaori Manabe
- Chisato Morishita
- Tamao Satō
- Yinling
- Megumi Yasu
- Ayako Nishikawa
- Mona Yamamoto
- Sheila
- Chiriko Sakashita
- Chinatsu Wakatsuki
- Aki Hoshino
- Suzanne
- Mai Satoda
- Kanako Yanagihara
- Sumiko Nishioka
- Ai Haruna
- Tsubasa Masuwaka
- Yuu Tejima
- Erika Yazawa
- Manami Marutaka
- Nana Ozaki
- Kayo Noro
- Akemi Darenogare
- Satomi Shigemori
- Mari Yaguchi
- Misono
- Kei Yasuda
- Mai Oshima
- Ami Kikuchi
- Konan
- Emi Kobayashi
- Stephanie
- Kuniko Asagi
- Okazu Club
- Nitche
- Natsu Ando (Maple Chogokin)
- Ami Inamura
