= Manami Marutaka =

Japanese gravure idol

- 丸高 愛実
- Born: 12 June 1990 (age 35); Tokyo, Japan
- Other names: Marukō (まるこう); Manamin (まなみん)
- Occupations: Gravure idol; tarento; actress
- Years active: 2009–
- Agent: Avex Vanguard
- Height: 164 cm (5 ft 5 in)
- Spouse: Yoichiro Kakitani (m. 2016)
- Children: 2
- Awards: Top Of Gravure Grand Prix

Manami Marutaka (丸高 愛実, Marutaka Manami; born 12 June 1990, in Tokyo) is a Japanese tarento, actress, and former gravure idol. Marutaka is represented with Avex Vanguard. Her husband is footballer Yoichiro Kakitani.

== Filmography ==
=== Variety ===
| Run | Title | Network | Notes | Ref. |
|---|---|---|---|---|
| Feb 2010 – | Top Of Gravure | SukaPā Enta! 371 | | |
| Feb–May 2010 | Itsuzai S | TX | | |
| May–Sep 2011 | Nemurenu Machi no A Prince | NTV | Regular | |
| 6 Jun, 5, 12 Jul 2011 | Hitori Gekidan no Shin Bangumi o Kangaeru Kaigi | EX | | |
| 8 Jun, 14 Sep 2011, 11 Feb, 30 Jun 2012 | Goddotan | TX | | |
| 24 Jun 2011 – 27 Jan 2012 | Shūmatsu ni Shitai 10 no koto!: Shūmatsu ni Shitai 3 no koto! | NTV | | |
| Oct 2011 – Jul 2012 | Tokyo Hit Girl | NTV | Regular | |
| 9 Jan 2012 – | Six Hunter II | TVA | Six Hunter | |
| 13 Jan – 21 Dec 2012 | Gilgamesh Light | BS Japan | Regular (G9 member) | |
| 17 Apr, 21, 28 Aug, 2 Oct, 13 Nov, 4 Dec 2012 | London Hearts | EX | Magic Mail Trap Girl, Mirai no Kumada-Isoyama Audition Jun-Queen, Josei Geinōjin Manatsu no Sports Test, Shifuku Sense Nashi Jo, Ura de konna Koto Yattemashita | |
| 3, 10 Oct, 21, 28 Nov 2012 | Onegai! Ranking | EX | Guest | |
| 11, 18, 25, 29, 31 Oct, 7 Nov 2012 | Piramekino | TX | Guest | |
| 1 Apr 2013 – 31 Mar 2014 | Nippon Dandy | Tokyo MX | Regular (Monday birdie) | |
| 11 Apr 2013 – 25 Sep 2014 | Motemote Company R25 | KTV | Regular | |
| 14 Sep 2013 | Doyō Special: Genryū-ten Mezashite 128-kilo: Fune to Toho de Iku! Fujikawa no Tabi | TX | | |
| 7 Apr 2014 – 26 Sep 2016 | Bara iro Dandy | MXTV | Regular appearances (Monday birdie) | |
| 29 Oct 2014 – 29 Sep 2015 | Shimura-za | CX | Regular | |
| 13 Jul 2015 | YamaP no kiss Eigo | CX | Regular | |
| 14 Oct 2015 – 29 Mar 2017 | Shimura no Jikan | CX | Regular | |

=== TV dramas ===
| Run | Title | Role | Network | Notes |
|---|---|---|---|---|
| 2010 | Kinoshita-buchō to Boku | | YTV | Episode 4 |
| 2010 | Taxmen | | MXTV | |
| 8 Oct – 23 Dec 2010 | Jōō 3: Special Edition | Leila | TX | DVD box released 18 Feb 2011 |
| 12 Jan – 16 Mar 2011 | Misaki Number One!! | Aimi Moriguchi | NTV | |
| 13 Jan – 6 Apr 2012 | Toranaide Kudasai!! Gravure Idol Ura Monogatari | Manami Marutaka | TX | DVD released 25 May 2012 |
| 25 May, 1 Jun 2012 | Mōichido Kimi ni, Propose | Ayana Mita | TBS | |
| 30 Jul 2012 | Getsuyō Golden Zaimu Sōsa-kan: Ruriko Amemiya 7 | Clerk | TBS | |
| 30 Nov 2012 | Tokumei Tantei | Akane | EX | Episode 8 |
| 10 Jan – 28 Mar 2013 | Yome Daikō hajimemashita. | Noa | KTV | |
| 9 Jun 2014 | Tetsuko no Sodate-kata | Takako Yahaba | NBN | Episode 10 |
| 4 Aug 2014 | Hero | Kanako | CX | Episode 4 |
| 22 Dec 2014 | Sakura: Jiken o Kiku Onna | Erika | TBS | Final Episode |
| 10 Jan 2015 | Doyō Wide Gekijō Kyotaro Nishimura Travel Mystery 63 | Yukari Matsuura | EX | |
| 23 Feb 2015 | Keibuho Shintaro Sugiyama: Kichijōji-sho Jiken File | Wakana Yamaguchi | TBS | Episode 7 |
| 15 Jul 2015 | Keiji 7-ri | Ryoko Uchida | EX | Episode 1 |
| 19 Aug 2015 | Mai Hanasaki Speaks Out: 2nd Series | Emiri | NTV | Episode 7 |
| 21 Aug 2015 | Bokura Playboy: Jukunen Tantei-sha | | TX | Episode 5 |
| 29 Oct 2015 | Seishun Tantei Haruya: Otona no Aku o Yurusanai! | Natsuki | YTV | Episode 3 |
| 18 May 2016 | Suiyō Mystery 9 Keishichō Sakura Police: Saikyō no Shimai Sōsa-kan | Kaori Hasaki | TX | |

=== Advertisements ===
| Run | Product | Notes |
|---|---|---|
| | Takara Leben Ohayōgozaimasu (10) | |
| Oct 2012 – | Glico Dairy "Dororich" | Dororich Girls |
| 1 Jan 2013 – | Aiful Shimin Marathon Kyōsan | |

=== Films ===
| Date | Title | Role | Distributor | Notes |
|---|---|---|---|---|
| Jun 2010 | avex New Star Cinema Collection Vol.2 Custard Purin | Chiharu | Avex | Lead role |
| 15 Sep 2010 | Kisarazu Grafiti Vol.4 | | Avex | |
| 24 Sep 2011 | Yarisugi Companion to Atashi Monogatari | Shizuka Hojo | Argo Pictures | |
| 27 Apr 2013 | Monster | | Ark Entertainment | |
| 21 Dec 2013 | Noroi-hō 2405: Watashi ga Shinu Riyū: Gekijō-ban | Yuki Sanada | | |
| 30 May 2015 | Shinjuku Swan | Nashigo | | |

=== Stage ===
| Date | Title | Location |
|---|---|---|
| Jun 2010 | Zip-A-Dee-Doo-Dah | Theatre Sunmall |

=== Internet dramas ===
| Run | Title | Website |
|---|---|---|
| 13 Mar – 8 May | Yamikin Ushijima-kun | d-Video powered by BeeTV |

=== Internet ===
| Run | Title | Network | Notes |
|---|---|---|---|
| Nov 2009 – Mar 2010 | Ameba Studio Show | Ameba Studio | Regular MC |
| Aug 2009 | Toriaezu Namachū (Kari) Getsuyōbi | Niconico Live Broadcast | |
| Oct 2009 | Sokuseki Koibito: Dai 4-kai | BeeTV | |
| 27 Feb 2010 | Daigo P | Niconico Live Broadcast | |
| 27 Jul 2011 – | Manami Marutaka no Onedari! Ranking | Ameba Studio | Pay broadcast |
| 1 Feb 2012 – | L et M Watashi ga anata o Aisuru Riyū, sono hoka no Monogatari | BeeTV | |
| Jun–Jul 2012 | Aikao | image.tv Gravure.net | |
| 22 Jun 2012 | M-3hree no Shibuya na, | Niconico Live Broadcast | |
| 23 Aug 2012 | Ijily Okada to Erika Yazawa no Koibana Onagokai! Manami Marutaka & Seara Kojo Premium Hōsō | Ameba Studio | |

=== Arcade games ===
| Year | Title | Publisher |
|---|---|---|
| 2014 | Rakuen pachinko CR oshioki Piramidden with Manami Marutaka | Takao |

== Works ==
DVD

| Date | Title | Publisher |
|---|---|---|
| 23 Jul 2010 | Manami Iro | E-Net Frontier |
| 22 Jul 2011 | Manami Iro 2 | E-Net Frontier |
| 20 Oct 2011 | Idol One: Manami Iro 3 | Line Communications |
| 27 Jan 2012 | Manami Iro 4 | Shinyusha |
| 25 Apr 2012 | Manami Iro 5 | Gakken Publishing |

CD

| Date | Title | Label | Notes |
|---|---|---|---|
| Jan 2010 | Super Eurobeat Vol.200 Nyan Nyan World | Avex Group | Top Of Gravure |

micro SD

| Date | Title | Label | Notes |
|---|---|---|---|
| Jul 2010 | Jibun Dori'! 5 | Avex Group | Omnibus (Kana Tsugihara, Asami Tada, Maiko Kikkawa, Rei Toda) |

Magazines

| Date | Title | No. | Publisher | Notes |
|---|---|---|---|---|
| 23 Jan, 16 Apr, 7 May, 2 Jul, 27 Aug, 22 Oct, 19 Nov 2012, 13 May 2013 | Weekly Young Magazine | | Kodansha | Gravure, front page |
| 13 Dec 2010, 8 Aug 2011, 4 Jun, 5 Nov 2012 | Weekly Playboy | | Shueisha | Gravure |
| | Young King | 2012 24, 2013 12, 19 | Shōnen Gahō-sha | Front page gravure |
| | Bomb | Oct 2010, Oct 2011 | Gakken Publishing | Gravure |
| 2 Oct 2012, 1 Jun 2013 | Young Animal Arashi | | Hakusensha | Front page gravure |
| | Gekkan Young Magazine | Sep 2012, Sep 2013 | Kodansha | Appendix DvD |

Songs

| Date | Title | Songwriter, composer | Artist |
|---|---|---|---|
| 21 May 2012 | "Toranaide Kudasai!! (Don't Shoot Me Mr!!)" | Tomoyuki Tajiri, Naoyuki Motozawa | TeleTo 7-chan Girls (Nana Ozaki, Natsumi Kamata, Yukie Kawamura, Ayaka Komatsu, Anri Sugihara, Yuu Tejima, Misaki Nito, Eri Wada) |
