= Reiko Takagaki =

Japanese actress

- 高垣 麗子
- Born: October 11, 1979 (age 46); Tokyo, Japan
- Occupations: Model, actress
- Years active: 1995-present
- Spouses: Hiroyasu Shimizu (2010 - 2011); Masanori Morita (2015 -)

Reiko Takagaki (高垣 麗子, Takagaki Reiko; born October 11, 1979, in Tokyo, Japan) is a Japanese model and actress who is represented by the agencies Incent and Idea. She graduated from Sagami Women's University High School. She is the eldest of three siblings (with a younger brother and sister).

== Biography ==
Takagaki debuted as an exclusive model in Petit Seven in 1995. Then she was an exclusive model for JJ and appeared in fashion magazines, such as More, Style, Classy, Ef, and Luci.

In 2006, Takagaki starred in the net movie 10minute Diary directed by Eriko Kitagawa.

From February 2008, she became an exclusive model for AneCan.

Takagaki married speed skating player Hiroyasu Shimizu on March 31, 2010, but they divorced on December 19, 2011. She married music producer Masanori Morita on March 27, 2015.

== Filmography ==
=== TV series ===
| Year | Title | Role | Network | Notes |
|---|---|---|---|---|
| 1999 | Naomi | | Fuji TV | |
| 2001 | Shin Omizu no Hanamichi | | Fuji TV | |

=== Magazines ===
| Year | Title | Publisher | Notes |
|---|---|---|---|
| 1995 | Petit Seven | Shogakukan | Exclusive model |
| | JJ | Kobunsha | Exclusive model |
| | More | Shueisha | |
| | Style | Kodansha | |
| | Classy | Kobunsha | |
| | Ef | Shufunotomo | |
| | Luci | Fusosha | |
| 2008 | AneCan | Shogakukan | Exclusive model |
| | Bessatsu Luart | (Mail-order magazine) | |
