= JJ (magazine) =

Japanese fashion magazine

- January 2003 cover
- Editor: Sayaka Hara
- Categories: Fashion
- Frequency: Monthly
- Circulation: 563,201 (2014)
- Publisher: Kobunsha
- Founded: 1975
- Country: Japan
- Language: Japanese
- Website: jj-jj.net

JJ is a Japanese fashion and lifestyle magazine published by Kobunsha. It was established in 1975 as an extra issue of Josei Jishin, and was the first women's magazine for college students in Japan. Most readers of JJ are females between the ages of 17 and 26, and range from college students to office workers.

JJ advises its readers to dress conservatively. It uses many professional fashion models, however the models it uses are not necessarily under exclusive contract with JJ. The model Ryoko Tanami is frequently featured in Classy, a version of JJ targeted to women aged between 24 and 28.

JJ Bis is a version of JJ magazine for older teens.

== Models featured in JJ ==
=== Current ===
References

- Nicole (ja)
- Ai Okawa
- Karen Fujii
- Miwako Kakei
- Mayuko Arisue
- Lisa Kikukawa (ja)
- Kako Kondō
- Hirona Yamazaki
- Erina Mano
- Yuna Kawaguchi
- Hina Higuchi (ja)
- Mizuho Habu
- Ayaka Takamoto (ja)

=== Past ===
- Ema Asō
- Reira Aoyama (ja)
- Reira Arai (ja)
- Miki Arimura (ja)
- Akiko Ikeda
- Ayumi Katrina (ja)
- Saemi Ikeda (ja)
- Yuko Ito
- Nami Iwasaki (ja)
- Manami Ui
- Ayumi Uehara (ja)
- Mami Uematsu (ja)
- Anna Umemiya
- Alisa Uerahama (ja)
- Ari Ōta (ja)
- Minami Otomo (ja)
- Audrey Ayaka (ja)
- Saori Ochiai (ja)
- Yukari Obata (ja)
- Rie Ono (ja)
- Chikako Kaku (ja)
- Chieko Kuroda (ja)
- Nana Katase
- Natsuki Katō
- Eri Kaneko (ja)
- Ranko Kanbe
- Yuki Kubota (ja)
- Christina (ja)
- Meisa Kuroki
- Tomoe Genzaki (ja)
- Sari Kobayashi (ja)
- Keito Kondō (ja)
- Yuriko Sakaki (ja)
- Kura Kobayashi (ja)
- Yumi Sakurai (ja)
- Mayumi Shiina
- Risako Miura (ja)
- Mami Shimamura (ja)
- Aki Shimizu (ja)
- Yumi Sugimoto
- Karen Takizawa
- Noriko Toyama
- Yukari Sonohara (ja)
- Sonomi Takigawa (ja)
- Reiko Takagaki
- Ryōko Takahashi
- Saya Tajima (ja)
- Ryoko Tanami
- Akemi Darenogare
- Tomomi Tsunoda (ja)
- Devin
- Manami Teramoto (ja)
- Reiko Tokita
- Mitsuho Nakamura (ja)
- Mariya Nagao
- Natsumi (ja)
- Nanami (ja)
- Yuka Nanjo (ja)
- Miho Nishimura (ja)
- Anna Nose (ja)
- Hiroko Hatano
- Aki Higashihara
- Vivianne Ono (ja)
- Risa Hirako
- Fala Chen
- Shuuka Fujii
- Eriko Fujimoto (ja)
- Norika Fujiwara
- Brenda (ja)
- Juri Matsuda (ja)
- Maya Alina
- Keiko Mayama (ja)
- Marie Klabin
- Marion
- Mie (ja)
- Emiri Miyasaka
- Mai Yamazashi (ja)
- Haruko Yamada (ja)
- Yuumi (ja)
- Towako Kimijima (ja)
- Hinano Yoshikawa
- Loveli
- Liza Kennedy
- Rina (ja)
- Rinka
- Marianna Watari
