= Ayaka Hironaka =

Japanese announcer

- 弘中 綾香
- Born: February 12, 1991 (age 34); Kanagawa Prefecture, Japan
- Education: Keio Faculty of Law - Political Science
- Alma mater: Keio University
- Occupation: Television announcer
- Years active: 2013–
- Employer: TV Asahi
- Height: 1.57 m (5 ft 2 in)
- Spouse: Unknown (m. 2022)
- Children: 1

Ayaka Hironaka (弘中 綾香, Hironaka Ayaka, born February 12, 1991) is a Japanese TV announcer employed by TV Asahi. She specializes in variety programs.

== Life and career ==
Hironaka attended Keio Chutobu Junior High School, Keio Girls Senior High School, and graduated with a degree in political science at the Faculty of Law at Keio University. She was a part of the orchestra club and ski club in high school. In university, she was the manager of the field hockey team, and during this time she was also working part-time as a home tutor.

She was employed by TV Asahi on April 1, 2013, in the human resources department. However, she soon transferred to the TV announcer department and debuted as an announcer within the same year. On October 18, 2013, Hironaka replaced Yoshie Takeuchi as the assistant MC on the long running music program Music Station, continuing her tenure there until September 17, 2018, when she graduated from the show. She has been the assistant MC on Geki Rea-san o Tsurete Kita alongside Masayasu Wakabayashi since 2016 and makes occasional appearances as the assistant MC on various variety shows such as London Hearts.

=== Marriage ===
On September 30, 2022, she announced her marriage.

On May 31, 2023, she announced her pregnancy. On December 3, she announced that she gave birth to her first child, a daughter in November that year.
