= Hironaka =

Hironaka (written 弘中 or 広中) is a Japanese surname. Notable people with the surname include:

- Ayaka Hironaka (born 1991), Japanese TV announcer
- Heisuke Hironaka (1931–2026), Japanese mathematician
- Kuniyoshi Hironaka (born 1976), Japanese martial artist
- Ririka Hironaka (born 2000), Japanese track and field athlete
- Wakako Hironaka (born 1934), Japanese writer and politician
