= Josei (disambiguation) =

Josei (女性) is a Japanese word for "woman". It may also refer to:

- Josei manga, a genre of manga
- Josei Jishin, a Japanese weekly women's magazine
- Jōsei Toda (1900–1958), second president of Soka Gakkai
- Josei Shonan, a fictional character in the manga series The Prince of Tennis
