= Office Ladies and Salaried Men =

1998 non-fiction book by Yuko Ogasawara

Office Ladies and Salaried Men: Power, Gender, and Work in Japanese Companies is a non-fiction book by Yuko Ogasawara (小笠原 祐子, Ogasawara Yūko), published in June 1998 by University of California Press. It describes interactions between salarymen and office ladies in Japanese workplaces.

Ogasawara's thesis is that while formally female employees are subordinate to male employees, that informally the female employees exert control over the male employees, as office ladies have no actual career to lose but can jeopardize men who want careers. Office ladies accomplish this by discerning who to give gifts and therefore indirectly affecting reputation, not accomplishing certain parts of the job in assisting men, and in promoting gossip that affects reputations. Ping-Chun Hsiung of the University of Toronto Scarborough described what the office ladies do as using "systemic discrimination against them" as a means to benefit themselves.

This was the first book that studied the office lady phenomenon in detail. Kawanishi Yûko of Temple University Japan referred to the book as "a guerilla handbook on OL subversion tactics". Ogasawara also argued that compared to other disadvantaged persons, office ladies wielded relatively more power.

== Background ==
Ogasawara is a sociologist. She attended Sophia University for her undergraduate degree. Ogasawara enrolled in a PhD program at the University of Chicago, and did her research as part of that program. Ogasawara did her research for this book in the years 1991 and 1992. For a sixth month period, she worked for Tozai Bank; she used her experiences to write the book. Prior to her research project, she had not been employed as an office lady. While she was older than the typical office lady, she believed that the stereotyping of women meant that her age was overlooked; Sonoko Morita of Shoin Junior College in Kashiba, Nara, wrote that Ogasawara got her office lady job "with relative ease." Ogasawara did not disclose to the employer, nor her coworkers or the relevant employment agency that she took the job to do academic research for an external institution. She did not explicitly make a false statement to the institution, but allowed the institution to believe that she was seeking work simply to have something do so during her household's stay in Japan. She also did not correct the misconception that she was married, which the company assumed. While Ogasawara used a false name for the bank, Noriko Hagiwara of the University of Western Australia stated that one could take clues and identify the real bank.

She also interviewed 50 salarymen, 30 office ladies, and 30 wives of salarymen. Some of the office ladies she interviewed were still office ladies while others had retired. There were about 100 interviews total, conducted in and around Tokyo. Quotations from these interviews were incorporated into the book. The interviews with wives involved questions about how they assisted their husbands in preparing gifts for office ladies during White Day, and these interviews were done via telephone. Patricia Steinhoff of the University of Hawaii argued that Ogasawara could have gleaned more exact information about the wives' feelings about their husbands' involvement with office ladies if the interviews were conducted in person.

== Contents ==
The introduction is before the main chapters. In the introduction of the book, the author handled the issue of how much power office ladies actually have, as there were two seemingly conflicting ideas about the power they held; Women were perceived to have little role in the country's economy, and Japanese companies had been perceived as oppressing women. However, women in Japan were perceived as having a large amount of power in Japanese households, and in actual offices.

There are six main chapters. The first chapter, "The Japanese Labor Market and Office Ladies," describes what office ladies do, and the function office ladies have in the Japanese employment system. Work remained gender segregated despite the passage of the Equal Employment Opportunity Law in 1986. The second, "Why Office Ladies Do Not Organize," describes why office ladies do not collectively use labor bargaining. The ranking divisions within office ladies, combined with the fact that such rankings do not always coincide with academic credentials (as such credentials are often not considered when hiring), along with the temporary nature of such employment, are obstacles to labor-based solutions. This is despite the fact that under the law, office ladies may go on strike.

The means which office ladies do exercise power are in chapters 3-6. The gossiping and gifting methods are in chapters 3 and 4, "Gossip" and "Popularity Poll", respectively. More overt acts are documented in chapter 5, "Acts of Resistance." How men try to placate women in response is discussed in chapter 6, "Men Curry Favor With Women." The work also has a conclusion at the end, characterized by Rick Delbridge of the Cardiff Business School as "brief". Allison Davis-Blake of the University of Texas at Austin stated that the latter four chapters "are the most important contribution of the book."

Louisa Schein of Rutgers University described the manner of the book as having a "counterorientalist intent" to argue against the idea that Japanese women lack agency. Schein stated that the book was meant to argue against "the patronizing affect of Western feminism."

== Reception ==
Keiko Aiba (合場敬子, Aiba Keiko) of Meiji Gakuin University wrote that "The book is fun to read and useful for any-one interested in" its respective fields.

Sharon Chalmers, an independent scholar, argued that the work does not properly put the power plays of the office ladies in the proper "cultural-historical context". She also criticized Ogasawara's lack of disclosure of her reason for employment to relevant parties. She stated that she liked getting ethnographic testimony from people directly involved in the Japanese office environment.

Delbridge praised the "interesting and insightful empirical detail" and "important questions" the book raises.

Joyce Gelb of City University of New York described the work as "an insightful case study". Gelb stated that the work does not describe much about sexual harassment and how that factors into the working environment.

Moto Ezaki of Occidental College praised the book for "drawing an accurate picture of gender relationships" in Japan, and stated that the "extensive scope of its quantitative data" is "the strength" of the book's research.

Hagiwara praised the book for being "a vital contribution" on gender and Japanese studies. However Hagiwara, who had formerly worked as an office lady, argued that some of Ogasawara's conclusions were not accurate, as she stated that office ladies have a more substantial evaluation system, higher workloads, and less dependence by men than Ogasawara stated. Hagiwara added that workloads between different tracks of office ladies differ and that office ladies with university degrees often get more prominent jobs through connections. Additionally Hagiwara criticized the author not disclosing her identity to her employers and the possibility of identifying the bank she worked at.

Joy Hendry of Oxford Brookes University described the analytical content as "very clear and eminently readable". She stated that she wished that the book had examined an increasing trend of women gaining the same status as men in Japanese workplaces.

Kevin Henson of Loyola University of Chicago described the analytical content as "convincing and entertaining."

Hsiung described the book as a "splendid study", and "Rigorous intellectual inquiry".

Anne E. Imamura of the Foreign Service Institute described the book as "full of insights and well grounded".

Chieko Kamabyashi of Hosei University stated that the author had a "clear" "message" and that "The data is reliable." Kambayashi argued however that while Ogasawara stated that office ladies could act with relative impunity, the fact companies trace behavior of office ladies would contradict that point. Additionally, Kambayashi stated that she understood that Ogasawara's lack of candor to her employers may have been necessary as Japanese corporations may not have allowed her to do the research otherwise, but that Ogasawara's reputation in her profession in Japan would be damaged if the book had a Japanese translation and was accessible in Japan. Kambayashi also acknowledged that sociological works written in English would be far more distributed and understood than such in Japanese, as Japanese is not common in the sociological field and is not accessible to much of the world population.

Karen Kelsky of the University of Oregon described the book overall as "excellent", the style of writing as "lively and often witty" while the analytical content is "insightful". Kelsky stated that since the last primary source Ogasawara cited about female secretaries in the United States was from 1997, Kelsky stated that she wished that Ogasawara had cited more recent sources. Kelsky also expressed that she felt disappointment at the social structures in Japanese companies.

Louella Matsunaga, also of Oxford Brookes University, described the book as "well-written and perceptive". She praised the content about how seniority in Japanese companies causes division between employees, and the introduction for being "accessible and well-written".

Heung-wah Wong of the University of Hong Kong overall praised how the book reconciled seemingly contradictory viewpoints on gender relations. The reviewer stated that the only criticism had was how the work did not consider policies enacted by Japanese companies that complicated ability for women to organize.
