= Josei Jishin =

Japanese women's magazine

- Categories: Women's magazine
- Frequency: Weekly
- Publisher: Kobunsha
- Founded: 1958
- First issue: 2 December 1958
- Company: Kobunsha
- Country: Japan
- Based in: Tokyo
- Language: Japanese
- Website: jisin.jp

Josei Jishin (女性自身) ("Ladies' Own") is a Japanese weekly women's magazine. Published by Kobunsha and in circulation since 1958, it is Japan's first weekly women's magazine and targets single working women. Koji Tanabe is the current editor-in-chief.

Josei Jishin established the term OL, or Office Lady, in its November 25, 1963 issue. It spawned the fashion magazine JJ in 1975, which in turn lead to the release of Classy and Bis magazines.

== History and profile ==
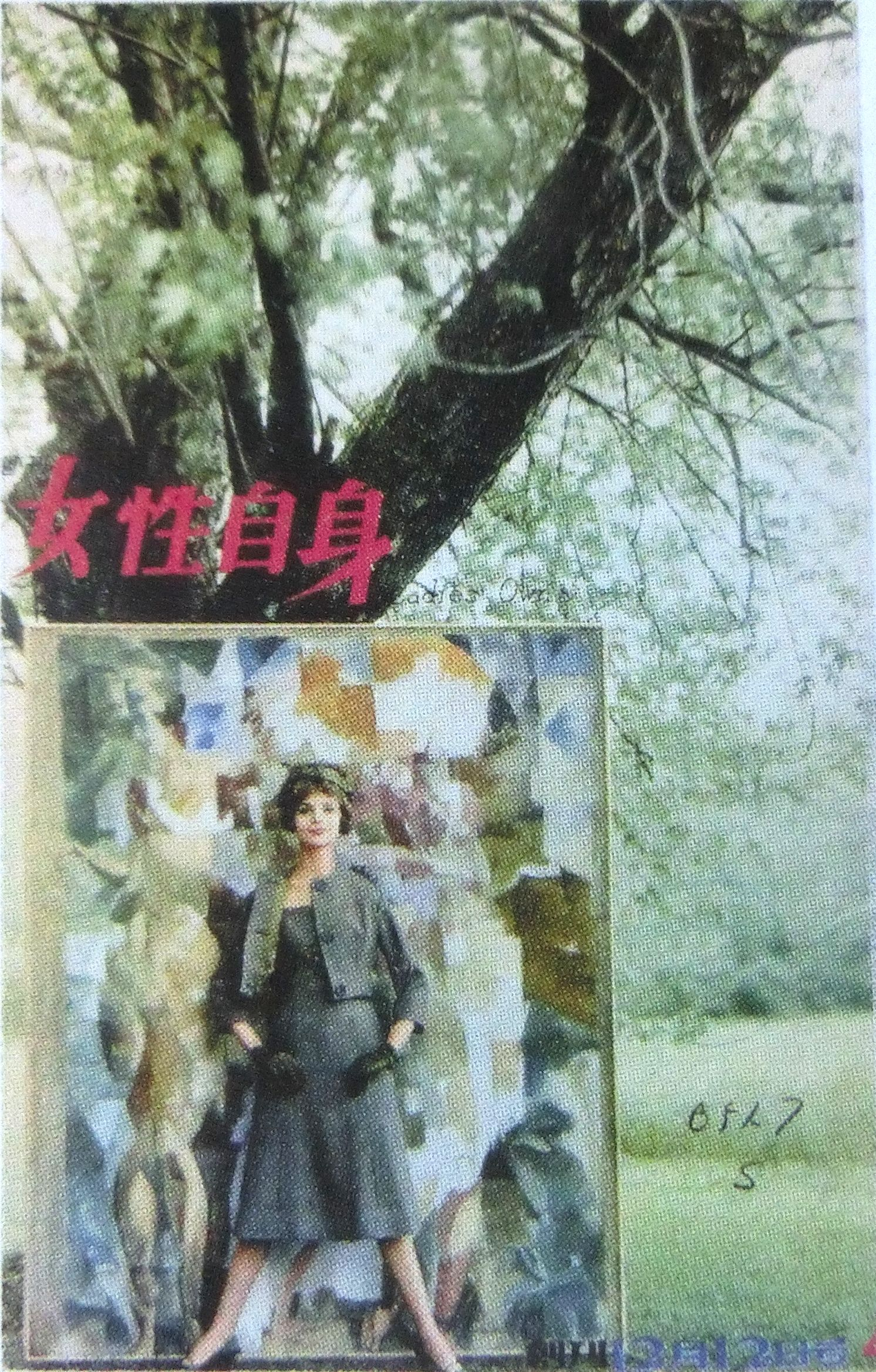
December 12, 1958 cover

Josei Jishin ("Ladies' Own") was established in 1958, with the first issue published on 2 December 1958. Kobunsha is the founding company, and the magazine is published on a weekly basis. It developed a collaboration with American youth magazine Seventeen and published its photographs during the initial years. Magazine sales in general were buttressed by Magazine sales were buoyed by the wedding of then-Crown Prince Akihito to commoner Shōda Michiko in April 1959.

In its November 25, 1963 issue, the magazine introduced the term OL (Office Lady) as an alternative to "Business Girl" after holding a competition among its readers. Due to Japanese pop culture influence in mainland China, Taiwan and Hong Kong, the term is also in common usage there although with a slighter different meaning.

The fashion magazine JJ, which was first published in 1975, originated as a special issue of Josei Jishin aimed at female college students. It has since spawned Classy, a version of JJ targeted to women aged between 24 and 28, and JJ Bis is a version for older teens.

In 1999, in honor of its fortieth anniversary Josei Jishin and its logo were redesigned.

== Retractions and legal issues ==
The magazine has received multiple complaints and demands for corrections from the Imperial Household Agency for publishing articles containing false information regarding the Imperial family.

In October 2007, J-pop duo Pink Lady sued Kobunsha for ¥3.7 million after Josei Jishin used photos of the duo in an article on dieting through dancing without their permission. The case was rejected by the Tokyo District Court. In February 2012, the Supreme Court rejected the duo's appeal based on the right of publicity.

In 2013, the weekly reported that Akie Abe, the wife of then-Prime Minister Shinzo Abe, had instructed that the kitchen of the Prime Minister's official residence be renovated at a cost of ¥10 million, but this was denied by Abe himself on his Facebook page, who demanded a retraction.

In August 2019, Josei Jishin reported misinformation about broadband cellular network 5G, claiming that it "caused a mass death of starlings," based on a conspiracy theory medical blog from overseas. This information had already been judged as "fake" by Snopes, an American fact-checking website.

An article in the March 24/31, 2020 combined issue titled "How to Avoid Losing to the Coronavirus: Medications You Should Stop Taking Now," received a flood of criticism: It made claims that taking stomach medicine, antibiotics, painkillers, antipyretics, and steroids would weaken the immune system. The article was removed from Yahoo's headlines and other platforms

An extra-large poster of Japanese men's national volleyball team player Ran Takahashi was included as a supplement in the October 10, 2023 issue, and the Japan Volleyball Association, which manages and controls the image rights of members of the national team, issued a statement of protest, claiming that it was published without their permission.

== Associated people ==
- Isamu Kurosaki, first editor-in-chief
- Kiyoshi Inoue, second editor-in-chief
- Hidekazu Sakurai, third editor-in-chief
- Takaya Kodama (He was in charge of articles related to Yukio Mishima at Mishima's request, who wanted "an excellent editor to be assigned to him." He even started bodybuilding at Mishima's suggestion. He became the third deputy editor-in-chief in 1967.)
- Koji Tanabe, current editor-in-chief
- Daizo Kusayanagi, political writer
- Rō Takenaka, entertainment writer
- Junichiro Kuroki, who was responsible for the "Series Human" program, including segments on Jakucho Setouchi, etc. husband of actress Chieko Matsubara.
- Tadaaki Maeda. After working as an entertainment reporter for this publication, moved to Fuji Television for which he currently works as a contracted entertainment reporter.
- Omoro Yamashita, former comedian, entertainment writer
- Sequence Hayatomo, Yoshimoto Kogyo comedian and popular Josei Jishin columnist, who claims to possess psychic abilities

== Awards ==
The magazine is a four-time recipient of Fujisankei award.

== Circulation ==
Josei Jishin sold 705,399 copies in the second half of 1979. In 2006 the circulation of the magazine was 519,464 copies, and its circulation decreased to 255,089 copies in 2010 and 243,568 in 2011.
