= Chīsai-ojisan =

Japanese cryptid

Chīsai-ojisan (小さいおじさん, lit. 'tiny/little mister') is a Japanese cryptid, which has been mentioned in urban legend since around 2009.

== Description ==
Chīsai-ojisan is a dwarf that looks like a middle-aged man. Witnesses say that he is about 8 to 30 cm tall.

Witnesses said that it was attached to a window, found in a bathroom, carrying an empty can on the side of the road, or on a tree in a park, etc.

In 2010, it was commercialized advertised that witnessing "Little Mister" give you a little luck.

There are many celebrities among the alleged witnesses. Those who claim to have seen it include Junichi Okada, Jun Kurose, Yumiko Shaku, Man Mori, Reiko Tokita, Mika Nakashima, Kōji Makoba, Marika Minami, Bintarō Yamaguchi, Tōru Watanabe, Junji Inagawa, Yūko Ōshima, Erena Ono, Yukina Kinoshita, Asuka Kuramochi, Eiko Koike, Chiaki Fujimoto, Tomoya Nagase, Masatoshi Hamada, Aya Hirayama, Hatsune Matsushima, Shigeru Mizuki, Kumiko Mori, Kanako Yanagihara, and Kanna Hashimoto. Among them, Yumiko Shaku has claimed to “have seen a fairy in the shape of a little man” for more than a decade before this urban legend became popular. Stories of seeing Chīsai-ojisan are often shared online or in casual conversation. Witnesses typically describe brief, surreal encounters in mundane locations, such as parks or under vending machines.
