= Ranko Kanbe =

- 神戸 蘭子
- Born: 14 April 1982 (age 43); Miyazaki, Miyazaki, Japan
- Other names: Ranko (らんこ); Ranran (らんらん); Kanbe-chan (神戸ちゃん); Ranko-chan (蘭子ちゃん)
- Occupations: Model; tarento; singer
- Agent: Next Satisfaction
- Style: Fashion

Ranko Kanbe (神戸 蘭子, Kanbe Ranko; born 14 April 1982, in Miyazaki, Miyazaki) is a Japanese fashion model, tarento and singer. She is represented with Next Satisfaction Factor.

While moving to Tokyo from Miyazaki Prefecture, Kanbe was invited to the staff of the women fashion magazine JJ in Shibuya at the age of nineteen and became a reader model. She mainly worked as an "S-size" model for the magazine. Kanbe is left-handed (but she sometimes uses her right hand when writing with a pen).

After graduating from university, she was employed to a textile company, but due to the promotion of its products, she continued to work as a reader model with company approval, and she fainted with pressure and retired, and continued to work as a free reader model for two years after that.

Kanbe was later scouted by her former entertainment office, Artist-house Pyramid, in 2008, and became popular as a tarento after making appearances in television programmes, in which made regular appearances, and made other works such as her singing début with the Hexagon unit Mai Satoda with Goda Kazoku, and publishing essay books.

== Filmography ==
=== Modelling works ===
Year	Title	Notes	Ref.
	Marui "CrystalSlyph"	Small size collection	
2009	Kobe Collection	Autumn/Winter	
2010	Tokyo Girls Collection	Spring/Summer	
2012	Tokyo Runway	Spring/Summer	

=== Former modelling works ===
Title	Notes
JJ	"S-size" model; she had appeared as a model for its beauty and fashion pages from 2009

=== TV programmes ===
Regular appearances

Title	Network	Notes
Love Gol	Sun TV, Sky A	Girls Golf Club spin-off

Former appearances

Year	Title	Network	Notes
2009	Omoikkiri Don!	NTV	Thursday panelist
2009	Omoikkiri Don! Dai 1-bu: Omoikkiri Don!	NTV	Thursday panelist
2009	Quiz! Hexagon II	Fuji TV	
2010	Pon!	NTV	Thursday "S-Size Model" panelist
2011	Bananaman no Kami Appli @	TV Tokyo	
2011	Girls Golf Circle	Sun	
2012	Girls Golf Club	Sun, Sky A	Girls Golf Circle spin-off
2012	"Kaiteki! Amazon Seikatsu" 1-kagetsu Koko dake de Kaimono suruto dō naru?	TV Tokyo	
2013	Audrey no Kami Appli @ Shinseki: Up Date	TV Tokyo	
2013	Solus Unique: Kirari kodawari	KTV	Kansai local
2014	Ranko & Mayu no Osawagase Police	KTV	

Dramas

Year	Title	Role	Network
2010	The Wallflower	Noi Kasahara	TBS

=== PV ===
Title
Princess Collection

=== Advertising ===
Year	Title	Role
2010	Calpis "Strong Belt"	Advertising character

=== Others ===
Year	Title
2010	NTT DoCoMo DoCoMo Market Contents "Boku no Kanojo wa Ranko Kanbe"

== Awards ==
Award	Notes
Hair Color Ring Award 2010 Josei Tarento Bumon	Hoyu organizer

== Bibliography and discography ==
=== Photo albums ===
Year	Title	ISBN
2010	Radiance	ISBN 978-4-7756-0482-3

=== Books ===
Year	Title	ISBN
2009	Es.	ISBN 9784777113088

=== Books with DVD ===
Year	Title
2010	Rugiada

=== Magazines ===
Year	Title	ISBN	Notes
	Classy		Reader model era
	CanCam		Reader model era
	Ray		Reader model era
2008	Self matome Kami Bible: Kiriri to fuwari	ISBN 9784883807802	
2009	G The Television Vol. 15	ISBN 9784048950558	

=== CD ===
Year	Title	Notes
2009	Akina Minami no Super Mild Seven / Mai Satoda with Goda Kazoku "I Believe –Yume o Kanaeru Mahō no Kotoba– / Don't leave me"	(Note: The songs are A-side singles "Don't leave me" by Mai Satoda with Goda Kazoku and "I Believe –Yume o Kanaeru Mahō no Kotoba–" by Akina Minami no Super Mild Seven.)
2009	Hexagon All Stars We Love Hexagon 2009	(Note: The songs are "Don't leave me" and "Mr. Gigolo" by Mai Satoda with Goda Kazoku.)
2009	Mai Satoda with Goda Kazoku Mai Satoda with Goda Kazoku	(Note: The songs are "Don't leave me", "Mr. Gigolo", "Kawaī Akuma" and "You are my everything" by Mai Satoda with Goda Kazoku.)

=== DVD ===
Year	Title
2008	Jibun de Maki Kami
	Self matome Kami Bible: Kiriri to fuwari
Omoikkiri Don! Micchaku Special
2009	I Believe –Yume o Kanaeru Mahō no Kotoba– / Don't leave me
2009	Mai Satoda with Goda Kazoku
2010	Hexagon Family Concert We Live Hexagon 2009
2010	Quiz! Hexagon II 2009 Gasshuku Special
2015	Tatta kore dake! Ranko Kanbe ga Oshieru Kihon Ballet Diet
