= Kazlaser =

Japanese comedian

- カズレーザー
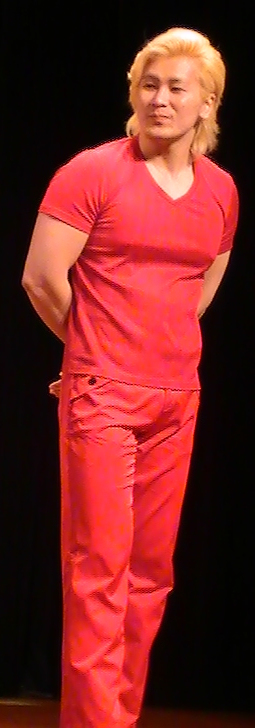
- Kazlaser in 2016
- Born: Kazunori Kaneko (金子 和令); 4 July 1984 (age 42); Kazo, Saitama, Japan
- Education: Doshisha University School of Commerce
- Years active: 2007–Present
- Agent: Sun Music Production
- Known for: Maple Chogokin (with Natsu Ando)
- Style: Manzai; conte (boke)
- Height: 180 cm (5 ft 11 in)
- Partner: Fumi Nikaido (m. 2025)

Kazlaser (カズレーザー, Kazurēzā; born 4 July 1984, in Kazo, Saitama) is a Japanese comedian. He performs boke in the comedy duo Maple Chogoukin. His real name is Kazunori Kaneko (金子 和令, Kaneko Kazunori). He is represented by Sun Music Production.

Kazlaser is known for his red clothing and gold hair. He stated that the look was inspired by the 80's anime series Space Cobra. Kazlaser's parents were both civil servants and his family are strawberry farmers.

== Personal life ==
In August 2025, Kazlaser announced his marriage to actress Fumi Nikaido.

== Filmography ==
=== Film ===
- Suicide Squad - Killer Croc (Japanese dub)

=== TV series ===
==== Current appearances ====
Year	Title	Network	Notes
2016	Cream Quiz Miracle 9	TV Asahi	
2016	Quiz Presen Variety: Q-sama!!	TV Asahi	(Note: He made indefinite appearances in the projects "Gakuryoku-ō No. 1 Kettei-sen" and "Pressure Story". In 29 February 2016 he won his first appearance and became a hot topic.)
2016	Futtō Word 10	NTV	
2018	Kaji Yarō	TV Asahi	MC

Occasional appearances

Year	Title	Network
2016	London Hearts	TV Asahi
2016	Yasashī Hitonara Tokeru: Quiz yasashī ne	Fuji TV
2016	Ametalk	TV Asahi

=== DVD ===
Year	Title
2009	Dai Bakushō On-Air dekinai Battle: Chika Geinin geki Yabaneta-sai
