= Reiko Tokita =

Japanese fashion model and tarento (born 1984)

- 土岐田 麗子
- Born: 31 May 1984 (age 41); Chiba Prefecture, Japan
- Other names: Tokky (トッキー, Tokkī); Reli (レリ, Reri)
- Occupation: Model
- Children: 1
- Modeling information
- Height: 157 cm (5 ft 2 in)
- Agency: Platinum Production

Reiko Tokita (土岐田 麗子, Tokita Reiko; born 31 May 1984, in Chiba Prefecture) is a Japanese fashion model and tarento. She is represented with Platinum Production. She works mainly on modeling of the magazine JJ.

== Works ==
=== Singles ===
Date	Album	Song	Notes
Jan 2010	JJ Sparkling	"Kono mama zutto Asamade"	Miliyah Kato cover

=== Videos ===
2006

Title
GyaO Original Drama: Dōtoku Joshi Tandai: Eco-ken: Daiichiwa "Semi"
GyaO Original Drama: Dōtoku Joshi Tandai: Eco-ken: Dainiwa "39°C"
GyaO Original Drama: Dōtoku Joshi Tandai: Eco-ken: Daisanwa "Tokyo Dasshutsu"

2008

Title	Publisher	Notes
Kanzen Hozon-ban! Naniwa Gourmet DVD "Takoyaki Den nen"		
Kanzen Hozon-ban! Naniwa Gourmet DVD "Okonomiyaki Den nen"		
Kanzen Hozon-ban! Naniwa Gourmet DVD "Kushikatsu Den nen"		
Oshare ni Golf –Wakuwaku Debut Junbi-hen–	TLip	The same title DVD with the same price book (Kinema-Junpo, Co., Ltd.)
Oshare ni Golf –Akogare no Course Debut-hen–	TLip	The same title DVD with the same price book (Kinema-Junpo, Co., Ltd.)

2009

Title
Mucha-buri! 3rd.Season Vol.3 Kanzenhan
Butai "Ojigi de Shape Up!'
Wednesday –Another World– Twilight File VI

== Filmography ==
=== Television (terrestrial) ===
Regular appearances

Run	Title	Network	Notes
Aug 2005 – Jun 2010	Verita	MBS	Kansai local; occasionally
Oct 2008 – Mar 2009	Megami-kei Golf	EX	Kanto local; occasionally
Oct 2010 – Mar 2011	Junichi Ishida no Machi no Tatsujin	BS-NTV	Second phase assistant; biweekly

Guest appearances

Date	Title	Network	Notes	Ref.
2006	Dancing Sanma Palace	NTV		
Jan 2007	Shiteki Chinavi	TBS		
28 May 2007	SMAP×SMAP	KTV, CX	Mie, Natsuki Katō and three people appeared in the Bistro SMAP section	
Oct 2007	Goro's Bar	TBS		
Mar 2008	Takajin no Sokomade Itte Iinkai	YTV		
27 Jan 2009	Style/Style	TVK		
26 Nov 2009	Take Me Out	TBS		
31 Dec 2009	Burāri Golf: Onna-darake no Kimama Golf Tabi	TX		
1 May 2013	Tokyo Precious Dating	EX	#52 Kiba	

=== Television (CS) ===
Year	Title	Network	Notes
2007	Den nen: Shiken ni deru? Osaka-ben	Sky PerfecTV! 726ch, Kansai TV Tokyo Channel	
2007	Kanzen Hozon-ban! Naniwa Gourmet DVD "Takoyaki Den nen"	Sky PerfecTV! 726ch, Kansai TV Tokyo Channel	
2008	Kanzen Hozon-ban! Naniwa Gourmet DVD "Okonomiyaki Den nen"	Sky PerfecTV! 726ch, Kansai TV Tokyo Channel	
2008	Kanzen Hozon-ban! Naniwa Gourmet DVD "Kushikatsu Den nen"	Sky PerfecTV! 726ch, Kansai TV Tokyo Channel	The above Takoyaki nen, Okonomiyaki dan, Kushikaden nen are sold on DVD

=== Radio ===
Run	Title	Network	Notes
Mar–Sep 2006	Up'Sound Radio		Appeared in the talk corner "BlogStreet on Radio" in the latter half of the programme. About 30 Community FM wired broadcasting. Distribution also from the performers' blog.
Apr 2007 – Mar 2008	Imadoki' C Nichiyōbi	MBS Radio	
Apr 2008 – Apr 2009	Imadokinnichiyōbi	MBS Radio	
11 Apr 2009	Madamada Gocha ma ze'!: Atsumare Yan Yan	MBS Radio	Appeared only for the first time and left

=== Internet ===
Run	Title	Website	Notes
2 Jul – 2 Sep 2006	Dōtoku Joshi Tandai: Eco-ken	GyaO	First episode "Semi" aired on 2 Jul 2006, episode 2 "39°C" 2 Aug aired, episode 3 "Tokyo Dasshutsu" 2 Sep aired. It was scheduled to deliver all 6 episodes, but finished with 3 episodes. The 3 episodes were sold on DVD. Dohhh UP! Free video distribution site, aired on 24 Aug 2007. Other performers are Hello! Project members.
24 Dec 2006	Ojigi 30-do	Dohhh UP!	
2 Jan 2007	Kim Sound Story	GyaO	Reiko's voice actress appeared from episode 5 (aired on 2 January 2007). Also singing "Do not be Daddy" with the unit name Mac The Reiko.
26 Mar – 9 Jul 2007	Lunchtime Navigation Midtown TV	GyaO	
23 Jul – 27 Aug 2007	Speed Wagon to Reiko Tokita no Maki	GyaO	Those that renewed the above programmes
3 Sep – 5 Nov 2007	Speed Wagon no Namadashi	GyaO	Those that renewed the above programmes
2007	Play! Awa's: Bi to Warai no Dai o Mise Ai Party	GyaO	
14 Nov 2007 –	Kachinuki! Idol Tengoku!! Nuki Ten	GyaO	
3 Feb – 27 Jul 2008	Haba Davao Monday	Ameba Studio	Every Sunday from 17:00-18:00, public live broadcast. MC, Daimaou Kosaka and Reiko Tokita.

=== Stage ===
Run	Title	Location
27 Feb – 2 Mar 2008	Ojigi 30-do	Shinjuku Theater Apul
7 Jun – 14 Jun 2009	Ojigi de Shape Up!	Le Theatre Ginza

=== Films ===
Run	Title	Location
17–19 Jul 2009	Twilight File VI: Wednesday: Another World	Tokyo Cinemato Roppongi

=== Advertisements ===
Date	Company	Product	Notes
Jun 2006	KDDI	au shopping Mall Back Stage Story	Co-starred with Miho Tanaka (non-no model) and Maimi Okuwa (CanCam model)
2007	Sunkeiving Newspaper	Ray Wedding (bridal magazine)	
Mar 2008	Nissan Motor	Kobe Collection×March	Co-starred with Liza Kennedy (JJ model)
2008	Choei (Nagaira Corporation)	Kyoto de Geya o Sagasunara...	
Feb 2009	Triumph International	Amo's Style	Co-starred with Cherry Pie (female double act)
2009	Macy Co., Ltd.	Suma Kon	

=== Music videos ===
Title	Artist	Song	Notes
2007	Eri Takenaka	"Kiiroi Hana -wedding story-"	Wedding GyaO image song

=== CD Jackets ===
Date	Title	Label	Publisher
Apr 2008	Glamorous House 2nd floor	Exit Tunes, Inc.	Pony Canyon
Oct 2008	Glamorous House 3rd floor	Exit Tunes, Inc.	Pony Canyon
Apr 2009	Glamoruos House 4th floor	Exit Tunes, Inc.	Pony Canyon

== See also ==
- Cawaii!
- JJ (magazine)
- Yoshio Kojima
- Sanrio – Sanrio Puroland
