= Akemi Darenogare =

Japanese-Brazilian fashion model and tarento (born 1990)

- Diana Akemi Darenogare Fukuzumi
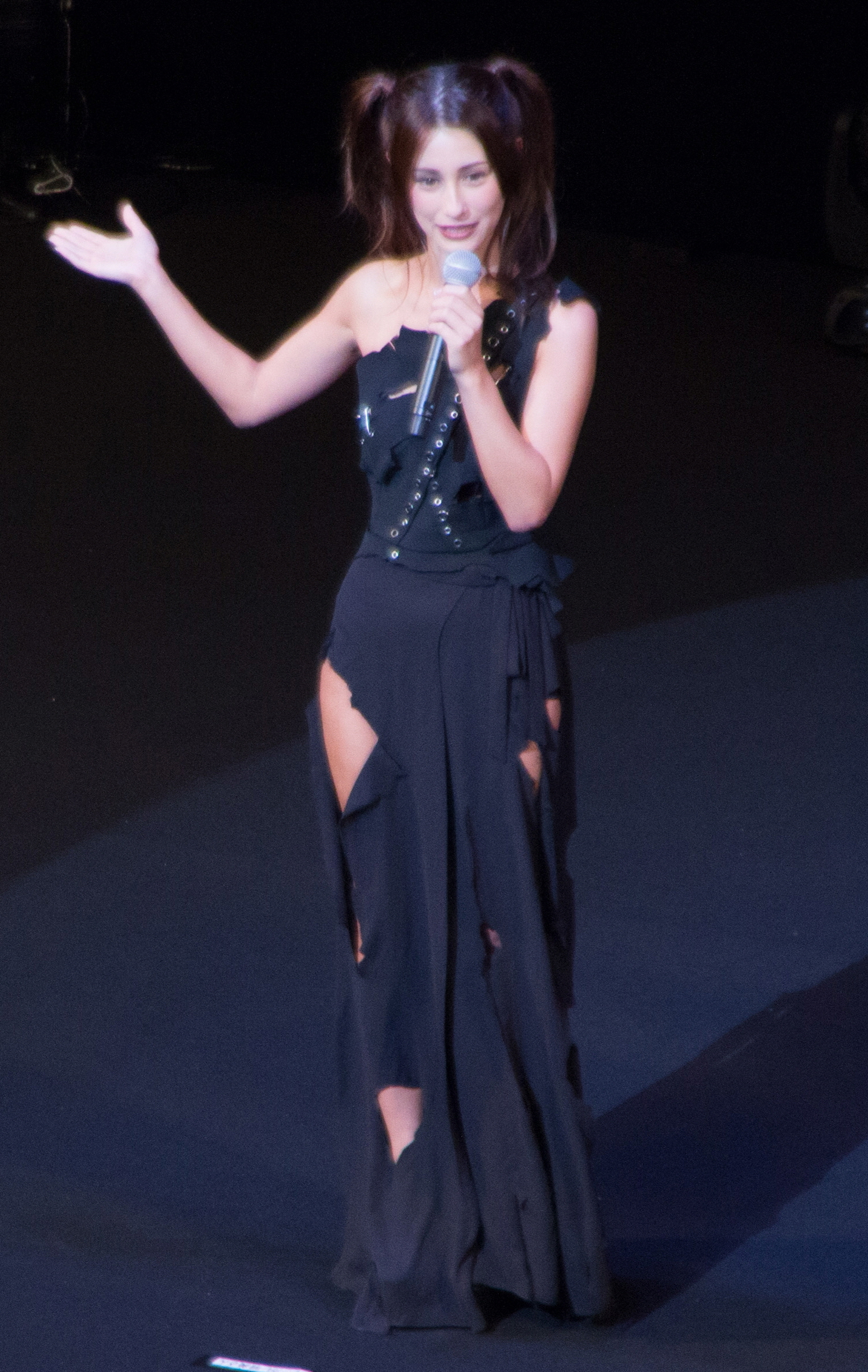
- Akemi Darenogare
- Born: 16 July 1990 (age 36); São Paulo, São Paulo, Brazil
- Other names: Dare-chan (ダレちゃん); Akemi Hepburn (明美ヘップバーン, Akemi Heppubān); Gesunogare (ゲスノガレ)
- Occupation: Tarento
- Years active: 2012–present
- Modeling information
- Height: 164 cm (5 ft 5 in) (2016)
- Agency: Libera

Diana Akemi Darenogare Fukuzumi (ダレノガレ 明美, Darenogare Akemi; born 16 July 1990) is a Japanese Brazilian fashion model and tarento who has appeared in a number of television programmes and magazine issues.

== Filmography ==
=== Runways ===
For convenience, the runway is assumed to be Spring/Summer as S/S and Autumn/Winter as A/W.

- Tokyo Girls Collection: 2012 A/W, 2013 S/S
  - in Nagoya (2012)

=== Variety ===
- Sunday Japon (Oct 2012 – , TBS) Quasi-regular
- Night Which is Noisy Together with Uchimura (Apr 2013 – Sep 2014, TBS) Regular
- The House (MXTV) - Studio MC
  - first season (Oct–Dec 2015)
  - second season (Jan–Mar 2016)

=== TV dramas ===
- Hanasaku ashita Episode 1 (5 Jan 2014, NHK BS Premium) as Sara
- Ubai Ai, Fuyu (Jan–Mar 2017, EX) as Reika Onoe

=== Internet dramas ===
- Mōchoi, Ubai Ai with Sei Drama (Jan 2017 – , AbemaTV) as Reika Onoe

=== Image model ===
- Avail
- Canmake

== Bibliography ==
=== Photo albums ===
- I'll give you my all (15 Jun 2015, Takarajimasha) ISBN 978-4800239464
- Enjo (25 Jan 2016, Shueisha, Photographer: Naoki Rakuman) ISBN 978-4087807769
- My Baby (23 Nov 2016, Kadokawa)*Person in charge of photographing other than cover

=== Magazine serialisations ===
- JJ (No. Jul 2012 – Oct 2015, Kobunsha)

=== Newspaper series ===
- Zubatto G-ron (Feb 2013 – , Sports Hochi)

== Awards ==
- 16th Best Swimmer Award.
- Nail Queen 2015 Model Department (2015)
