= Hiroko Hatano =

Japanese model and actress (born 1975)

Hatano Hiroko
- Born: November 23, 1975 (age 50); Saitama, Japan
- Occupations: Actress, Model
- Years active: 1994 – present

Hiroko Hatano (畑野 ひろ子, Hatano Hiroko; also known as 畑野 浩子) (born November 23, 1975) is a Japanese model and actress. As an 18-year-old, she made her model debut on Japanese fashion magazine JJ in March 1994. She was one of the top models for the magazine until 2001, when she temporarily quit modelling to concentrate on her acting career. She is now working for the fashion magazine CLASSY.

== Biography ==
Hatano was born in the Saitama prefecture in 1975. She attended Urawa Gakuin High School, in Urawa, Saitama, and began her modeling career during her high school days by appearing in JJ. She graduated from the Bunka Women's University (文化女子大学) in Tokyo with a degree in figurative arts.

== Career ==
For several years she was one of the top fashion models in Japan. Standing 168 cm tall, she was one of the tallest Japanese models at the time.

Hatano made her TV debut in the drama Beach Boys (ビ−チボ−イズ), in 1997, playing a small role. Some of the dramas she appeared became instant hits in Japan, helping her to establish herself in the Japanese TV industry.

Some of the TV dramas she has appeared in:

- Fuji TV (フジテレビ のだめ カンタービレ, No dame kantābire)
- TBS (弁護士のくず 12話, Bengoshi no Kuzu)
- Asahi TV (テレビ朝日 警視庁捜査一課9係, Keishichō sōsaikka 9 gakari)
- Asahi TV (テレビ朝日 サトラレ, Satorare)
- TBS (日曜劇場 ヨイショの男, Yoisho no otoko)
- Fuji TV (フジテレビ 初体験, Hatsu thaiken)

She is starring in the drama series 東京 Love Collection (東京 ラブコレ２).

== Private life ==
She enjoys Japanese traditional dance (日本舞踊（菊城流名取) and folk songs (民謡). Playing piano is one of her favourite pastimes. In 2004 she married Takashi Kashiwabara, also an actor, and temporarily quit her acting career. But the marriage soon ended in a divorce and in 2005 she was back in the entertainment industry. Before the marriage, she was known as Hatano Hiroko (畑野 浩子) but after her come back she decided to change her name and adopted the name Hatano Hiroko (畑野 ひろ子).

On August 21, 2008, Hatano announced her intention to marry footballer Keita Suzuki, by whom she has been pregnant for two months beforehand.
