= Natsu Ando =

Japanese comedian

Natsu Andō
- 安藤 なつ
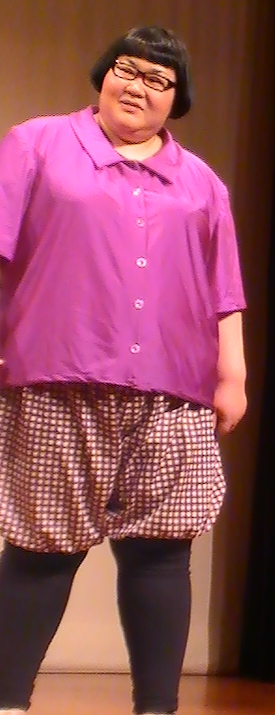
- Born: Kazuyo Ando (安藤 和代, Andō Kazuyo); January 31, 1981 (age 45); Tokyo, Japan
- Other names: Nacchan (なっちゃん); Natsu (なつ)
- Occupations: Comedian; actress
- Agent: Sun Music Production
- Known for: Maple Chogokin (with Kazlaser)
- Style: Manzai; conte (tsukkomi)
- Height: 1.7 m (5 ft 7 in)
- Website: Maple Chogoukin official profile

Natsu Ando (安藤 なつ, Andō Natsu; born 31 January 1981 in Tokyo, Japan) is a Japanese comedian. She is represented by Sun Music Production. She is currently a member of the comedy duo Maple Chogoukin.

== Filmography ==
=== TV drama ===
Year	Title	Role	Network	Notes
2006	Kurosagi		TBS	Episode 7
2009	7 Man-ri Tantei Nitobe		BS Asahi	Episode 3
2009	Atashinchi no Danshi	Saeko	Fuji TV	Episode 6
2009	Last Mail 2		TV Asahi	Episode 6
2010	Majisuka Gakuen	Yaba Kune Girls' High School senior	TV Tokyo	
2010	Trouble Man		TV Tokyo	
2011	Rebound	Bookstore office-lady	NTV	Episode 5
2011	Welcome to the El-Palacio		TV Tokyo	Episode 6
2013	Tank Top Fighter	Yasuko Awane	TBS	Episodes 5 and 6
2013	Trick Bangai-hen: Keibuho Kenzo Yabe 2		TV Asahi	Episode 5
2014	Nancy Seki noita 17-nen	Nancy Seki	NHK BS Premium	Lead role
2015	The Last Cop		NTV	
2015	Death Note		NTV	Episode 3
2016	Tensai Bakabon	Mama's classmate	NTV	

=== Films ===
Title	Role
Rough	

=== Original video ===
Title	Role
Kamen Rider Ghost: Ikkyu Eyecon Contention! Quick Wit Battle!!	Mayuko Sasahara

=== TV variety ===
==== Former regular appearances ====
Year	Title	Network
2013	Momoiro Clover Z Channel	TV Asahi

==== Former appearances ====
Special programmes

Year	Title	Network	Notes
2004	24 Hour Television	NTV	"Anata Jishin ga Watashinoyume Wakate Geinin 100-kumi!! Dai Shūgō: Ore no No. 1 Akogare Geinin wa donna Hito? – Chō Geki Netsui Manatsu no Dai Benkyō-kai!!"
2005	Ken Shimura no Baka Tonosama	Fuji TV	
2007	Kanji Summers: Onna-darake no Dai Shinnenkai (Nama) Idol ichigo Matsuri 2008	NTV	"Fresh Idol Gong Show"
2009	The Dream Press Company Special: Uwasa no Diet Seikō to Shippai no Wakaremichi Dream Press COmpany D-1 Concert	TBS	
2010	Ken Shimura no daijōbu daa	Fuji TV	
2014	Matching Love	TBS	
2016	Sanma Akashiya no Complekku Suhhai: Haru no Musabetsu-kyū Tournament Special	TV Asahi	

Occasional appearances

Year	Title	Network	Notes
	Shimura-ya desu.	Fuji TV	Mainly appeared in the second half; as "Natsuko"
2012	London Hearts	TV Asahi	
2013	Happy End	TBS	
2013	Onegai! Ranking	TV Asahi	
2014	Shimura-za	Fuji TV	
2014	5-ji ni Muchū	Tokyo MX	
2014	Special research police JUMPolice	TV Tokyo	
2016	Shimura no Jikan	Fuji TV	
2016	High Noon TV Viking!	Fuji TV	

=== Internet programmes ===
==== Current appearances ====
Year	Title	Website	Notes
2013	Tomita to ieba Maru Maru	Nico Jockey	Other Thursday appearances

==== Former appearances ====
Regular appearances

Year	Title	Website	Notes
2011	Nadeshiko Sun Music	Nico Jockey	Regular appearances in the comedy duo Puchi Kannon, later Maple Chogoukin

Other

Year	Title	Website
	Chō Sun Music	GyaO Jockey
	Cunning no Renai Chūdoku	GyaO
2009	Miyuki Torii no Shakō Jirei de High Touch	GyaO Jockey
2009	Tsuge ccha!	Gyao Jockey

=== Radio ===
Year	Title	Network	Notes
2016	Otenki nori no Recommen!	NCB	Mobile DJ

=== DVD ===
Year	Title
2008	Ken Shimura no Baka Tonosama Ōbanburumai-hen: Kisaragi no Maki
2012	Hikari Ijūin no baraetī: Radio no Miryoku ni Semari ma Show! –Tōkō shi Night– no Maki
2012	Hikari Ijūin no baraetī: Tainai Dokei de pittanko no Maki
2013	Hikari Ijūin no baraetī+: Runners' High de wahhawwa no Maki
2013	Hikari Ijūin no baraetī+: Oboete oboete 6-kagetsu no Maki
