= Manami Ui =

Japanese model

- 宇井 愛美
- Born: December 21, 1986 (age 39); Tako, Chiba, Japan
- Other name: Ui-chan (ウイちゃん)
- Occupation: Model
- Years active: 2009–
- Agent: LesPros Entertainment
- Height: 1.66 m (5 ft 5 in) (2009)
- Spouse: Junya Tanaka (m. 2013)
- Children: 1
- Relatives: Hatsumi Ui (sister)
- Awards: LesPros Girl Audition 2008 Finalist

Manami Ui (宇井 愛美, Ui Manami; born December 21, 1986, in Tako, Chiba, Japan) is a Japanese model represented by LesPros Entertainment.

== Life and career ==
Ui was born in Tako, Katori District, Chiba Prefecture.

She was a member Nippon TV's Zoom in!! Super from 2009 to 2010 and a weather caster from 2010 to 2011.

Ui was a finalist in the LesPros Girl Audition 2008 from LesPros Entertainment. She was later recognized by her agency and debuted as a model.

In 2009 Ui was an exclusive model for the magazine JJ. She was later a model for Ray and Spring.

Ui was in charge of the sports corner on Mondays in WOWOW Prime Stream's Purasuto.

Aside from modeling, she appeared in advertisements and as a reporter in television programs.

=== Marriage and family ===
On her 27th birthday on December 21, 2013, Ui announced that she married professional footballer Junya Tanaka. She later announced on her blog that she gave birth on July 16, 2014.

== Filmography ==
=== TV series ===
Year	Title	Network	Notes	Ref.
2009	Zoom in!! Super	NTV	"Tokyo Hot Style" reporter; "Ui-chan Weather" caster; "Tokyo Hot Clip" reporter	
2010	Dancing Sanma Palace	NTV		
2010	1 Oku-ri no Dai Shitsumon!? Waratte Koraete!	NTV		
2011	Kyōkasho ni Nosetai!	TBS		
2011	Shikaku Habataku	NHK E TV	Monthly Guest	
2011	Hama Changa!	YTV		
2011	Buramāyo-ka no Mimiyorīna Kyūden	NTV		
2011	Poshure Depart Shinya Mise	NTV		
2011	Dasshutsu Game Dero!	NTV		
2011	Haken OL wa Mita!	TV Tokyo		
2011	Arigato	TVK		
2011	Takatoshi no Meigen Suppli	TBS		
2011	Contact Cafe C	CBC		
2011	Marco Pololi	KTV		
2011	Zunō no Saiten! Quiz Ōja Kettei-sen! World Quiz Classic	TBS		
2011	Oto Ryūmon	NTV		
2012	RakuRaku! Otona Club	BS NTV	Regular appearances	
2012	Kanaful TV	TVK	Regular appearances	
2012	notty Live	NOTTV	Regular appearances	
2012	Ōshū Shūkyū Digest	Fuji TV One, Fuji TV Next	Facilitator	
2012	Tokyo Precious Dating	TV Asahi	Episode 16	
2012	Booking navi	WOWOW	Regular appearances	
2012	Konohen! Traveler	TV Tokyo		
2012	Saigo no! Ketsudan Show	KTV		
2012	run & ride	CS SkyA+		
2013	Futari Michi	BS NTV		

=== Advertisements ===
Title	Notes
Suntory Liquors	
KDDI	

=== Magazines ===
Current

Title	Notes	Ref.
Spring	Regular model	
Jitensha to Tabi		

Former

Title	Notes	Ref.
JJ		
Linell		
Running Magazine Creel 3 Tsuki-gō		
Ray	Regular model	
Tokyo 1-shūkan		
Weekly Playboy		
Digital TV Guide		
Biteki		
Miss		
mini		
Gainer		
Tarzan		
My Kyoto		
Osha Letters '11 Natsugō		
Kurasu Fuku 2011 Natsugō		
Bicycle Navi		
Capa		
Zipper		
PC fan		
Jitensha Hito		
MTB Biyori		

=== Music videos ===
Year	Title	Notes
	LGYankees "LG's Life"	
2011	Deep "Kimi Janai Dareka Nante: Tejina"	
2012	Cliff Edge "Sayonara I Love You feat. Jya-Me"	
