= Music Station =

Japanese television series

- Title screen as of 2016
- Genre: Music
- Presented by: Tamori; Sarasa Suzuki
- Narrated by: Jun Hattori; Sumire Uesaka; Ayane Sakura; Hiroshi Kamiya
- Opening theme: "1090 ~Million Dreams~" by Tak Matsumoto
- Country of origin: Japan
- Original language: Japanese
- No. of episodes: 1,365

Production
- Running time: 54 minutes (regular); 1 hour 48/54 minutes (two-hour specials); 2 hour 48 minutes (three-hour specials); 4 hour 10 minutes (Music Station Super Live)
- Production company: TV Asahi

Original release
- Network: ANN (TV Asahi)
- Release: October 24, 1986 – present

Music Station (ミュージックステーション, Myūjikku Sutēshon), stylised in all caps, is a Japanese music television program. Broadcasting live weekly on TV Asahi since October 24, 1986, it currently airs from 9PM-10PM on Fridays. The program is also colloquially known as M St. (Mステ, Emu Sute), MS (エムエス, Emu Esu), and M Station (Mステーション, Emu Sutēshon). The program has been aired internationally on Animax's networks in Southeast Asia, Hong Kong, Taiwan, and other regions from March 2007. It was also seen in the United States and Canada through the NHK-owned TV Japan until the network's closure at the end of March 2024 and was replaced by the Jme Japanese streaming platform, in Hong Kong via TVB J2 before it was renamed to TVB Plus in April 2024, in Singapore through Hello Japan! before the channel went off the air in July 2015 and in the People's Republic of China through CCTV-15.

== History ==
Music Station is a weekly one-hour music program similar to the American TRL or the British Top of the Pops. It is home to various performances as well as single rankings and other corners. Many Japanese musical acts make their debut on Music Station, but the show has also hosted many artists from around the world. As of October 2021, over 8,300 songs had been performed on the show.

From October 24, 1986, to March 31, 2000, Music Station was broadcast live on Fridays from 20:00–20:54 JST. It briefly switched to 19:54–20:48 JST from April 14 to September 15, 2000. The show returned to its previous schedule on October 6, 2000, and stayed there until September 13, 2019. After TV Asahi restructured its prime time slot, Music Station has been broadcast from 21:00–21:54 JST since October 18, 2019. This change was done to capture the young audience, whom, according to Tamori, are no longer home at 20:00.

On February 12, 2010, the show celebrated its 1000th episode with a special episode. In celebration of its 25th anniversary, Music Station launched its official YouTube channel and an internet show, Young Guns on the Web (based on its Young Guns segment).

== Presenters ==
Music Station has been hosted by famed Japanese TV-comedian Tamori since April 3, 1987. To date he has appeared in nearly every episode, marking over 1,360 appearances as the host. In 2021, he was certified as holding the Guinness World Record for "Longest running live TV music show hosted by the same presenter". The show is co-hosted by TV Asahi announcer Sarasa Suzuki (since October 7, 2022). The two provide banter for the show in between performances.

Sayaka Shimohira was the co-host from 1996 to 2000. Emi Takeuchi, TV Asahi broadcaster, was the co-host from 2000 to 2004. Mariko Dō was the previous co-host from 2004 to 2008. Dō first appeared on the show on April 9, 2004. This episode was a 3-hour special titled: New Start Best 100. Dō joining the program was a surprise to the media, as she was new to the industry and had only been hired by TV Asahi nine days before becoming the co-host of a prime time program. After 4½ years, she graduated from the program on September 12, 2008, with Autumn Special Part 1. Yoshie Takeuchi served the co-host role from October 3, 2008, to September 27, 2013. Ayaka Hironaka was the co-host from October 18, 2013, to September 7, 2018. Marina Namiki was the co-host from October 19, 2018, to September 23, 2022., Suzuki Sarasa was the co-host from October 7, 2022, to September 18, 2026.

Date	Main	Sub	Studio sub
October 24, 1986 – March 27, 1987	Hiroshi Sekiguchi	Rie Nakahara	Yū Hayami
April 3, 1987 – December 25, 1987	Tamori	Rie Nakahara	Yasumasa Matsui
January 8, 1988 – March 23, 1990	Tamori	Yasumasa Matsui	Chikako Kinoshita
April 13, 1990 – March 19, 1993	Tamori	Hiroshi Ikushima	—N/a
April 9, 1993 – September 24, 1993	Tamori	Hiroshi Ikushima	Satsuki Ariga
October 15, 1993 – March 22, 1996	Tamori	Satsuki Ariga	—N/a
April 5, 1996 – March 31, 2000	Tamori	Sayaka Shimohira	—N/a
April 14, 2000 – March 12, 2004	Tamori	Emi Takeuchi	—N/a
April 9, 2004 – September 12, 2008	Tamori	Mariko Dō	—N/a
October 3, 2008 – September 12, 2013	Tamori	Yoshie Takeuchi	—N/a
October 18, 2013 – September 7, 2018	Tamori	Ayaka Hironaka	—N/a
October 19, 2018 – September 23, 2022	Tamori	Marina Namiki	—N/a
October 7, 2022 – September 18, 2026	Tamori	Suzuki Sarasa	—N/a
October 16, 2026 – present	Tamori	Kurumi Tani	—N/a

== Segments ==
Music Station is home to various weekly segments, the most common being the weekly singles ranking and the monthly album ranking.

=== Music Station Ranking ===
The Music Station Ranking segment began in November 2017. It is a renewal of the "Music Topics" segment.

=== Music Station Young Guns ===
Young Guns is a segment on Music Station that has been done sporadically since it began on February 18, 2005. It gives information about new rising artists in the Japanese music scene. The segment normally involves a VTR (video presentation) before giving a small interview and performing their first song.

List of Music Station Young Guns
Date	Artist	Song
February 18, 2005	High and Mighty Color	"Pride"
February 18, 2005	Under Graph	"Tsubasa"
February 25, 2005	YUI	"Feel My Soul"
March 4, 2005	Se7en	"Hikari"
March 11, 2005	K	"Over..."
April 22, 2005	Shōnan no Kaze	"Karasu"
April 29, 2005	Rie fu	"I Wanna Go to a Place..."
May 27, 2005	Miwako Okuda	"Ame to Yume no Ato ni"
June 10, 2005	Depapepe	"Start"
June 17, 2005	Tsubakiya Quartette	"Ajisai"
June 24, 2005	Def Tech	"My Way", "Kono Mama"
September 2, 2005	Younha	"Hōki Boshi", "Touch"
September 16, 2005	Beat Crusaders	"I Can See Clearly Now", "Feel"
September 16, 2005	AAA	"Blood on Fire"
November 4, 2005	Miliyah Kato	"Jounetsu"
January 9, 2006	Home Made Kazoku	"Sarubia no Tsubomi"
January 27, 2006	Aqua Timez	"Tōshindai no Love Song"
February 10, 2006	Yuko Ando	"Nо̄zen Katsura (reprise)"
March 17, 2006	SunSet Swish	"My Pace"
April 21, 2006	Ikimono-gakari	"Sakura"
April 28, 2006	Aya Kamiki	"Pierrot"
May 5, 2006	Mihimaru GT	"Kibun Jōjō"
June 2, 2006	Angela Aki	"This Love"
June 9, 2006	Captain Straydum	"Fūsen Gum"
August 4, 2006	Seamo	"Lupin the Fire"
August 18, 2006	Jinn	"Raion"
August 25, 2006	Suemitsu & the Suemith	"Astaire"
September 1, 2006	Fumidō	"Aishiteru"
September 8, 2006	Sachi Tainaka	"Saikō no Kataomoi"
December 17, 2006	Chatmonchy	
February 2, 2007	Funky Monkey Babys	"Lovin' Life"
February 23, 2007	Jyongri	"Possession"
April 6, 2007	Superfly	"Hello Hello"
May 18, 2007	Kousuke Atari	"Hana"
June 1, 2007	ET-King	"Itoshī Hito e"
June 8, 2007	Stephanie"	"Kimi ga Iru Kagiri"
June 15, 2007	Doping Panda	"I'll Be There"
July 13, 2007	Nao Matsushita	"Moonshine (Tsukiakari)"
July 27, 2007	Monkey Majik	"Sora wa Marude"
August 18, 2007	RSP	"Lifetime Respect (Onna Hen)"
January 18, 2008	Perfume	"Baby Cruising Love"
January 25, 2008	Thelma Aoyama	"Soba ni Iru ne"
February 22, 2008	Shota Shimizu	"Home"
March 7, 2008	Sotte Bosse	"Hirari"
April 25, 2008	Miho Fukuhara	"Change"
May 5, 2008	Base Ball Bear	"Changes"
May 16, 2008	Kariyushi58	"Ukui Uta"
May 30, 2008	Kimaguren	"Life"
June 6, 2008	Motohiro Hata	"Niji ga Kieta Hi"
August 15, 2008	Nico Touches the Walls	"Broken Youth"
September 5, 2008	Girl Next Door	"Gūzen no Kakuritsu"
October 17, 2008	Flumpool	"Hana ni Nare"
October 24, 2008	Scandal	"Doll"
November 7, 2008	Michi	"PROMiSE"
November 28, 2008	Lil'B	"Kimi ni Utatta Love Song"
November 28, 2008	Kurumi Enomoto	"Bōken Suisei"
January 16, 2009	Monobright	"Anata Magic"
February 20, 2009	Lego Big Morl	"Ray"
March 6, 2009	Rock'A'Trench	"My Sunshine"
March 27, 2009	Dew	"Thank You"
May 1, 2009	Sid	"Uso"
June 5, 2009	9mm Parabellum Bullet	"Black Market Blues", "The Revolutionary"
June 19, 2009	May J.	"Garden"
July 10, 2009	Kana Nishino	"Kimi ni Aitaku Naru Kara"
August 14, 2009	Lecca	"For You"
October 23, 2009	Hilcrhyme	"Shunkashūtō"
March 5, 2010	Galileo Galilei	"Hamanasu no Hana"
April 30, 2010	Does	"Bakuchi Dancer"
May 21, 2010	Jasmine	"Dreamin'"
June 4, 2010	Mao Abe	"Lonely"
July 30, 2010	Moumoon	"Sunshine Girl"
May 4, 2012	Sekai no Owari	
May 18, 2012	Back Number	
May 25, 2012	Ayaka Ide	
June 16, 2012	Civilian Skunk	
June 22, 2012	Che'Nelle	
March 25, 2016	La PomPon	"Unmei no Roulette Mawashite"

=== Former segments ===
CD Single Ranking

Music Station Single Ranking covered the top 10 selling singles of the week. Their chart differed from the Oricon charts in that Oricon charts the sales from Monday to Sunday, whereas Music Station's chart reflects the sales from Friday to Thursday. This segment appeared in nearly every episode of the program since 1989. Many of the highest selling artists would perform on Music Station if their single happened to break a certain personal or nationwide record. The last ranking was broadcast on February 24, 2017.

CD Album Hit Ranking

CD Album Hit Ranking was a monthly album ranking, charting the highest selling albums of the time. The segment also included live performances by bands/singers to promote their new album releases. The last ranking was broadcast in September 2010.

Music Topics

Most weeks, Music Station has a segment called Music Topics (Mトピ “emu-topi”). Music Topics goes in depth about the current goings on in the Japanese music scene.

Chat Sessions

Chat Sessions was a weekly segment on Music Station. It often featured a new artist or actor appearing to promote a new project or film. It was one of the longest appearing segments on the show. The show's co-hosts chatted with the weekly guests as well as that week's "Special Guest", often taking questions from audience members. Since July 2005, this segment has gone on hiatus due to lack of questions submitted, and thus there are now only regular talks with the week's performers.

Mini Music Station

Mini Music Station, or Mini Sta. (ミニステ, Mini Sute) for short, was broadcast weekly from October 18, 2002, to September 13, 2019, from 19:54–20:00 JST. Airing just before the main show started, the co-host talked to 1 or 2 of the artists on that episode, then introduced the other artists watching that segment before announcing that the show would begin shortly.

== Yearly specials ==
Each year, Music Station hold various specials all over Japan. Some of these include, best seasonal songs, anniversary specials and such. These can range anywhere from 2 to 3 hours in length. There will also be various specials with no actual artists performances, these will often be the current hosts discussing the history of the shows and playing some of the more notable performances.

== Super Live ==
In 1992 Music Station introduced their largest yearly live event, the Music Station Super Live. Music Station Super Live is held late December normally occurring just before or just after Christmas, as a Christmas/year-end celebration concert. In 1998, it occurred on Christmas Day. The artists are normally asked about how their year was and how they are planning their year ahead. Initially the specials ran for three hours but as of 2003 have since been expanded to four hours. Super Lives commonly have 20 to 40 artists performing; the 2006 edition featured 43 artists. The 2006 edition of Super Live was also later aired worldwide by Animax across its network in Southeast Asia, premiering on February 17, 2007. The 2007 edition was also aired on February 9 and 10, 2008, on Animax. In 2019, in honor of the network's 60th anniversary, the Music Station Ultra Fes (a special version of the show that aired regularly around fall), and the Super Live was combined to make Music Station Ultra Super Live, a show that ran for over 11 hours (12:00 P.M. JST ~ 11:10 P.M. JST) and was attended by 49 acts.

Music Station Super Live was held at Tokyo Bay NK Hall in Chiba from 1992 to 2003. In 2004, it was held at the Saitama Super Arena. Since 2005, it is held at the Makuhari Messe Event Hall.
