= Moe Yamaguchi =

Japanese tarento (born 1977)

- 山口 もえ
- Born: 11 June 1977 (age 48); Taitō, Tokyo, Japan
- Other names: Moe-chan (もえちゃん)
- Education: Seijo University
- Occupations: Model; tarento; actress
- Years active: 1998–
- Height: 158 cm (5 ft 2 in)
- Spouses: Shigeo Ozeki (m. 2005; div. 2011) Yuji Tanaka (Bakushō Mondai) (m. 2015)
- Children: 2

Moe Yamaguchi (山口 もえ, Yamaguchi Moe; born 11 June 1977, in Taitō, Tokyo) is a Japanese tarento. She is affiliated with the Stardust Promotion talent agency.

== Filmography ==
=== Variety ===
==== Current ====
Run	Title	Network	Notes	Ref.
	AsaPara!	YTV	Quasi-regular	
	Bebop! High Heel	ABC	Quasi-regular	
	Takajin no Sokomade Itte Iinkai, now Sokomade Itte Iinkai NP	YTV	Quasi-regular, for the first time	
	Asaichi	NHK G	Irregular guest	
	Go Go! Smile!	CBC		
5 Apr 2013 –	Kinyō Otonite	BS Japan		
	Cream Quiz Miracle 9	EX	Occasional appearances	

==== Former ====
Run	Title	Network	Notes
Apr 1999 – Mar 2003	Italia-gokaiwa	NHK E	Regular
Apr 1999 – Mar 2003	Yoshimoto bakana	NTV	Regular
Apr–Jun 1999	Machami no Zenbu itadaki!!	CTV	Regular
Aug–Sep 1999	Uchikuru!?	CX	Regular
Oct 1999 – Mar 2001	Aa! Bara-iro no Chin-sei!!	NTV	Regular
Jan 2000 – Mar 2001	Gōgai!! Bakushō Dai Mondai	STV	Regular
Jan–Aug 2000	Tokusō Shinjin Saizensen	MJTV	Regular
Nov–Dec 2001	Ryuta Mine no Hon no Hiru Meshi Mae	NTV	Regular
2001	Sanma no Super Karakuri TV	TBS	Quasi-regular
Apr–Sep 2002	Mirai Yūen	BS-TBS	Regular
Apr 2004 – Mar 2005	50's High	BS Japan	Regular
Jun 2005 – May 2007, Oct 2007, Mar 2008	Quiz! Hexagon II	CX	Quasi-regular
	London Hearts	EX	Regular, later irregular
	2-ji-Ciao!	TBS	Mondays, later Tuesdays; regular
Oct 2007 – Mar 2008	Omoikkiriī!! TV	NTV	Fridays; regular
	Baribari Value	MBS	Quasi-regular, stopped appearing after marriage
	IQ Sapuri	CX	Quasi-regular, achieve the fourth perfect refreshment ever in career
	Koji Imada no Shibuya-kei ura ringo	CX	Regular
	Henachoko Punch	CX	Regular
	Akko ni omakase	TBS	Quasi-regular
2 Feb 2010	The Ryōri-ō	NTV	
1 Aug 2010	Makanai Meshi Tabe makuri!!	FCT	
27 Aug 2010	Ai no Gekijō: Otome wa Tomerarenai	NHK E	
	Art Entertainment: Meikyū Bijutsukan	NHK BShi	Quasi-regular
	Sōgō Shinryō-i Doctor G	NHK BShi, BS2	Occasionally
	Sokoga Shiritai: Tokusō! Bandō Research	CBC	
17 Mar 2012	Quiz Miracle Farm	EX	

=== TV dramas ===
Date	Title	Role	Network	Notes
1998	Cyber Bishōjo Telomeres	Michiko	EX	
1998	Sommelier	Customer	CX	Episode 4
1999	Yonimo Kimyōna Monogatari	Policewoman	CX	"Manual Keisatsu"
2000	Kimi ga Oshietekuretakoto	Misaki Ono	TBS	
2001	Yome wa Mitsuboshi.	Haruka Sasaki	TBS	
2001	Sekai de Ichiban Atsui Natsu	Reiko Kawai	TBS	
2001	Joshi Keimusho Higashi San-gōtō 3	Tomoko Okazaki	TBS	
2003	Message: Kotoba ga Uragitte iku	Ayumu Takeuchi	YTV	
2009	Soratobu Tire	Taeko Yuzuki	Wowow	
6 Aug 2010	Unubore Keiji	Kotomi Ohashi	TBS	Episode 5

=== Radio ===
Run	Title	Network
Oct 1999 – Mar 2000	Ore-tachi yatte masu: Suiyōbi	MBS Radio
Oct 1999 – Mar 2001	Ore-tachi yatte masu: Kinyōbi	MBS Radio

=== Films ===
Year	Title	Role
1998	Rokudenashi Blues '98	Chiaki Nanase
2004	Gin no Angel	

=== Stage ===
Year	Title
2006	Ken Shimura Ichiza

=== Advertisements ===
Year	Brand	Product	Notes
	Yamazaki Baking	Chūkaman	
1995	Marusanai	Cup Akadashi	
1995	Lotte	Choco Pie Ice	
	Yamada Denki		
1996	McDonald's	McShake 120-En	
1996	Mars Master Foods	Maltesers	
	Atlus	Revelations: Persona	As Maki Sonomura
	Lion Corporation	Stopper	
	Kagome	Yasai Seikatsu	
	Suntory	Tainai kirei Cha Kokokara	
	Matsumotokiyoshi	Nani demo hoshi garu Mami-chan	
	Zenkoku Mu Senmai Kyōkai		
	La Paulle		
	Toyota	T-Up	
	NTT Communications	My Line Plus	
	Iona International Corporation	Iona Keshōhin	
	Tokai Pickling	Kyūri no Kyū-chan	
	Sharp Corporation	Nihon Ichi Mijikai Quiz Show Sharp ni Kotaete	
	Up Garage		
	Soft99 Corporation	Air Touch	
	Nippon Ham	Chūka Nana	
	KOSÉ	Hialo Charge	
	Duskin	Duskin Rentall	
2016	Chiyoda	Shoe Plaza Kutsu no Shitadori 2-bai	
2017	Chiyoda	Tokyo Kutsu Ryūtsū Center "Haru no Shin Seikatsu Fair"	

== Bibliography ==
Date	Title	Publisher	Code
Sep 1998	moe? - Moe Yamaguchi Shashin-shū	Bunkasha	ISBN 4821122421
Aug 2015	Gin no Hōsoku - Moe Yamaguchi no Daylet Life	Aoba Shuppan	ISBN 4873175526
Oct 2010	Moe Yamaguchi no Oyasai tappuri! Oyako gohan	Shodensha	ISBN 978-4396820572
