= Yoko Kumada =

Japanese singer

Yoko Kumada 熊田 曜子
- Born: May 13, 1982 (age 43); Gifu, Gifu Prefecture, Japan
- Other names: Kumayō (くまよう); Yōko-chan (ようこちゃん); Kuma-chan (くまちゃん); Kumacchi (くまっち)
- Children: 3

Yoko Kumada (熊田 曜子, Kumada Yōko; born May 13, 1982) is a Japanese gravure idol, singer, and YouTuber originally from Gifu, Gifu Prefecture, Japan. She is affiliated with Artist-house Pyramid Inc.

== Biography ==
During her third year at Seki Shoko High School, Yoko Kumada applied for Weekly Shōnen Magazine's Miss Magazine swimsuit contest. She became a finalist during the contest, but dropped out due to the opposition of her mother. Kumada attended nursing school, but could not give up her dream of being an entertainer, so she participated in Audition magazine's 2001 Special Audition, where she caught the attention of talent agency Artist-house Pyramid. From 2002 to 2003, she was a member of the group "P-Girl" with Sachie Koike, Erika Itō, and Noriko Sagara.

In 2006, Kumada released her first single "Always"/"Watashi Dake no Basho" (Always / わたしだけの場所; lit. "Always"/"My Place") after years of vocal training. A year later, she was appointed as the tourism ambassador of Gifu Prefecture's Hida/Mino Jiman Project. In 2011, at the request of boxer Kōki Kameda, Kumada served as a ring girl during his match in Osaka. That year, she also appeared in the fashion magazine I Love Mama.

== Personal life ==
In April 2012, Kumada announced she had married and on December 3, she announced the birth of her first daughter (the exact birth date was not disclosed). On April 28, 2015, she announced her second pregnancy and revealed that she had a miscarriage in 2014. Kumada announced the birth of her second daughter on October 27. On January 11, 2018, she announced her third pregnancy and the birth of her third daughter was reported on June 26.

On May 18, 2021, Kumada's husband was arrested for domestic violence against her, but he was released on bail on May 20. On May 31, Kumada announced that she is in the process of discussing divorce with her husband, according to her agency from Thursday. Their divorce was only finalized on April 21, 2023.

== Appearances ==
=== Television ===
==== Variety ====
- London Hearts (TV Asahi network)
- S.B.S.T (TV Tokyo network)
- Akko ni Omakase! (Tokyo Broadcasting System network)
- Go on (Kyoto Broadcasting System only)
- Hebimetasan (TV Tokyo network)
- LIVE BANG! (TV Tokyo network)

==== Drama ====
- Ichibankurainohayoakemae (TV Tokyo only)
- Tanteibugi (Tokyo MX only)

=== Film ===
- Old Car (2023)
- Zagin de Shisu!? (2024)

=== Radio ===
- Yoko Kumada Yo～ko Okiki! (Gifu Broadcasting System etc.)
- Mitsubishi Fuso presents Yoko Kumada Kaze wo Atsumete (Tokyo FM etc.)

=== CM ===
- For-side.com
- ACOM

== Works ==
=== DVDs ===
- à la mode (March 20, 2002, AQUA HOUSE)
- Indian summer (September 15, 2002, VEGA FACTORY)
- Legend (February 28, 2003, Edge)
- Hibiscus (June 26, 2003, )
- Kumada Yoko (August 20, 2003, h.m.p)
- Labilynth (January 27, 2004, Fuze-jp.com)
- Rainbow (February 25, 2004, For-side.com)
- Se-jo!A (March 25, 2004, GPMuseum)
- teleport (July 25, 2004, VEGA FACTORY)
- Rodeo Girl (October 25, 2004, For-side.com)
- Self Produce (October 25, 2004, GPMuseum)
- Beach Angels in Bali (November 24, 2004, VAP)
- Stronger (February 20, 2005, I-ONE)
- Everytime (February 20, 2005, I-ONE)
- Dawning Window (April 25, 2005, For-side.com)
- Friendly Ship (May 25, 2005)
- Day Off (June 25, 2005, For-side.com)
- Treasure (Juli 20, 2005, SonyMusic)
- Kumada Yoko Special DVD Box (December 15, 2005, I-ONE)
- Yoko, Sweetheart (February 15, 2006, MARE)
- Love-Me (April 25, 2006, For-side.com)
- Talk-Me (May 25, 2006, GOT)
- Heartful Days (May 25, 2006, For-side.com)
- ihohjin mohhitorinowatashi (June 30, 2006, Liverpool)
- With (September 20, 2006, I-ONE)
- Glare (December 15, 2006, For-side.com)
- Collaboration Box ～Because or You～ (February 28, 2007, Sakurado)
- Premiere DVD-BOX (March 25, 2007 GPMuseum)
- Rendez-Vous (May 31, 2007, Gomabooks)
- Gravinist Yoko (August 24, 2007, For-side.com)
- Favorite (October 24, 2007, Creave)
- 4 Pieces BOX (November 20, 2007, I-ONE)
- Yoko Sweets (January 20, 2008, I-ONE)
- Wonder Land (April 25, 2008, E-NET FRONTIER)
- Tropical Blossom (July 18, 2008, For-side.com)
- Shinai (October 24, 2008, Takeshobo)
- Nama Yoko (January 30, 2009, AQUA HOUSE)
- Muteki (April 25, 2009, Shinyusha)
- Sexual Soulmate (October 25, 2020, Air Control)

=== Photobooks ===
- mimoza (March 20, 2002, AQUA HOUSE) ISBN 4-86046-038-3
- ff (August 27, 2002, Bestsellers) ISBN 4-584-17089-4
- Sun 3 Yoko (February 28, 2003, Edge) ISBN 4-921159-52-1
- 7×7 7Day's 7Color's (August 22, 2003, BUNKASHA) ISBN 4-8211-2557-9
- Trap! (December 18, 2003, Gakken) ISBN 4-05-402130-1
- Doll Week (March 23, 2004, Takeshobo) ISBN 4-8124-1560-8
- Happening Blue (May 13, 2004, Kodansha) ISBN 4-06-364579-7
- Private (June 30, 2004, Ascom) ISBN 4-7762-0178-X
- Beruang Manis (August 31, 2004, Takeshobo) ISBN 4-8124-1805-4
- Komorebi (November 22, 2004, SAIBUNKAN) ISBN 4-7756-0056-7
- Comfortable (March 25, 2005, Wanimagazine) ISBN 4-89829-790-0
- Kuma You (July 27, 2005, Kodansha) ISBN 4-06-364645-9
- Dreamy Days (October 28, 2005, AQUA HOUSE) ISBN 4-86046-100-2
- Love Potion (April 8, 2006, Gakken) ISBN 4-05-604333-7
- Sunlight (June 23, 2006 eastpress) ISBN 978-4-87257-700-6
- Cover Girl (July 25, 2007, Ongakusenkasya) ISBN 978-4-87279-209-6
- Zettaikyosya Perfect Master (March 30, 2008, Shinyusya) ISBN 978-4-88380-753-6
- Shinai (October 24, 2008, Takeshobo) ISBN 978-4-8124-3650-9
- Nama Yoko (January 30, 2009, AQUA HOUSE) ISBN 978-4-86046-118-8
- Muteki (April 25, 2009, Shinyusha) ISBN 978-4-88380-947-9

== Discography ==
=== Singles ===
- "Always"/"Watashi Dake no Basho" (April 19, 2006)
