= Takashi Kashiwabara =

Japanese former actor (born 1977)

- 柏原 崇
- Born: March 16, 1977 (age 49); Kofu, Yamanashi, Japan
- Occupation: Actor
- Years active: 1994–2014
- Notable work: Love Letter as Itsuki Fujii; Leonie as Michihiko Kawada
- Spouses: Hiroko Hatano (m. 2004; div. 2006); Yuki Uchida (m. 2026)
- Relatives: Shuji Kashiwabara (brother)

Takashi Kashiwabara (Japanese: 柏原 崇, Hepburn: Kashiwabara Takashi; born March 16, 1977) is a former Japanese actor. After retiring from acting, he became a behind-the-scenes worker and is currently the manager of actress Yuki Uchida.

== Career ==
In 1993, he made his acting debut in the TV drama Shadow of Youth, which made him won the grand prize at the 6th Junon Super Boy Contest.

In 1995, at the film Love Letter directed by Shunji Iwai, he made his screen debut and the following year won the Japanese Academy Awards for Newcomer of the Year. In South Korea, he gained explosive popularity despite his short screen time as soon as it was released.

In 1996, he played a role in the TV drama Hakusen Nagoshi. Since then it was made into a series for nine years. He also returned from both illness and suspension for assault in this drama.

In 2003, he left the Itsumo Futari de after two episodes due to neck-shoulder-arm syndrome during filming, and his role was replaced by Shingo Katsurayama.

In 2006, he appeared in a TV drama series for the first time in a long time. On February 25th, he divorced Hiroko Hatano.

Nearly a decade later, in October, 2015, he opened his official website.

== Personal life ==
In June 2004, he married actress Hiroko Hatano, and held his wedding reception at Happo-en. In December at same year, he was involved in an assault incident after an argument with a person who had parked on the street and was washing his car.

After his divorce, he dated Yuki Uchida, with whom he co-starred in the drama Big Wing, for a long time, but eventually retired from acting and became Uchida's manager. He says that "he is often surprised when he bumps into people he used to work with at Uchida's sets". He is currently working behind the scenes, and refuses to appear in public at all. However, on April 3, 2026, it was announced that Kashiwabara and Uchida had officially registered their marriage.

== Filmography ==
=== Film ===
Year	Title	Role	Notes	Ref.
1995	Love Letter	Itsuki Fujii		
1995	Birthday Present	Nakamoto Chosuke		
1999	Kimi no Tame ni Dekiru Koto	Shuntarō Takase	Lead role	
2000	Another Heaven	Atsushi Kimura		
2000	Tales of the Unusual	Yuichi Tokunagi	Lead role; anthology film	
2006	Black Night	Satoichi	Lead role; anthology film	
2006	13 no Tsuki	Yoshioka Yu	Lead role	
2008	AIBOU: The Movie	Kazunori Shioya		
2009	The Unbroken	Onchi Katsumi		
2010	Leonie	Michihiko Kawada		

=== Television ===
Year	Title	Role	Notes	Ref.
1996	Hakusen Nagashi	Yūsuke Hasebe		
1996	Itazura na Kiss	Naoki Irie	Lead role	
1997	Hakusen Nagashi: Spring at Age 19	Yūsuke Hasebe	Television film	
1998	Tabloid	Takumi Saruwatari		
1999	Hakusen Nagashi: The Wind at Age 20	Yūsuke Hasebe	Television film	
2001	Hakusen Nagashi: The Poem of Travels	Yūsuke Hasebe	Television film	
2003	Hakusen Nagashi: Age 25	Yūsuke Hasebe	Television film	
2004	Orange Days	Sano		
2005	Hakusen Nagashi: The Final – Even as the Times of Dreaming have Passed	Yūsuke Hasebe	Television film	

=== Original video ===
Year	Title	Role	Notes	Ref.
1995	Akagi the Gambler	Akagi Shigeru	Lead role	
1997	Akagi the Gambler 2	Akagi Shigeru	Lead role	

== Awards ==
Year	Award	Category	Work(s)	Result	Ref.
1996	19th Japan Academy Film Prize	Newcomer of the Year	Love Letter	Won	
1999	23rd Elan d'or Awards	Newcomer of the Year	Himself	Won	
