= In-home tutoring =

Academic support that takes place in the home

In-home tutoring, also known as tuition in British English, is a form of tutoring that occurs in the home. Tutoring involves receiving guidance and instruction from a tutor who may serve as a teacher or mentor to the student receiving the tutoring. Most often tutoring relates to an academic subject or test preparation. In contrast to tutoring centers or tutoring provided through after-school programs, the practice usually involves one-on-one attention provided to a pupil in their home. When multiple students are present, the practice is also commonly referred to as small group tuition.

== Benefits ==
In-home tutoring services send a qualified tutor directly to the client, which provides flexibility and convenience to the learners and their parents. Children benefit from an individualized program separate from traditional classes. A tutor can address any special needs and work to ensure that the pupil receives help and support in the areas that require the most attention. Tutors work with clients to reach goals and objectives, improve oral capacity to recite in class, develop capacity to use reasoning, and motivate the student when taking exams. Learners face fewer distractions in the home environment than in coaching centers, schools, colleges, and other public spaces.

Through in-home tutoring, parents also have the opportunity to monitor the performance of their child and to discuss their progress with the tutor, who shares the child's aims and objectives with the parents, as well as provide them parents with guidance to improve their child's performance. Due to the direct connection home tutors share with the students, home tutoring may be suited to helping students understand their strengths and weaknesses and use these to their advantage to improve their overall performance.

== Criticism ==
With the large variety of tutoring, a way to ensure the student receives proper training is for tutoring to be provided by professionals or students who have received a tutor certification from an accredited organization, such as the ACPT.

== No Child Left Behind ==
In the US, parents can take advantage of the No Child Left Behind Act to qualify for free tutoring for their child. A company must be registered as a supplementary educational services (SES) provider. The child must meet state qualifications that often involve attendance of a failing No Child Left Behind school and poor grades. When the child is qualified, the US government will fund the tutoring.

== See also ==
- Tutor
- Teaching assistant
- Tuition agency
- Tutelage
- Tutorial
