= Nana Ozaki =

Japanese gravure idol (born 1982)

Nana Ozaki (尾崎菜々, Ozaki Nana; born September 12, 1982) is a Japanese gravure idol. She is represented by talent agency Fang. She is from Osaka and interested in tennis, long-distance track events and Western popular music.

She worked with talent agency Artist Box until December 28, 2007.

== Profile ==
- Nickname: Nothing (Nana)
- Profession: 'Gravure idol' (Japanese term: swimsuit/bikini model)
- Date of Birth: 12 September 1982
- Birthplace: Osaka, Japan
- Height: 163 cm (5 feet and 4.2 inches)
- Measurements: B86 W58 H85 cm (B33.9 W22.8 H33.5 inches)
- Talent Agency: Fang

== Bibliography ==
=== Magazines ===
- "HANAMARU WORK Vol.20 November 2006" (Adluck, 2006) Cover photo
- "Weekly Playboy No.45" (Shueisha, 2006) pp. 223–226
- "FLASH No. 985" (Kobunsha, 2007) pp. 37–44

== Filmography ==
=== TV Programs ===
- FNS Chikyu Tokuso-tai Die Buster (FNS地球特捜隊ダイバスター) Fuji Television
- Kyuyo Mesai (給与明細) TV Tokyo
- Shirosaki Jin to Isoyama Sayaka no Kiwame-michi (城咲仁と磯山さやかの極めみち) GyaO
- Oni Hatchu (オニ発注) TV Tokyo

=== V-Cinemas ===
- Desearter Aoi Zetsubo (デザーター 青い絶望)
- Desearter Akai Kibo (デザーター 赤い希望)
- Gambare Bokura no Gura-dol Heroine (～がんばれ僕らの～グラドルヒロイン エスピリオン)

=== Image DVDs ===
1. Koi no Yokan (恋の予感 / The Foreboding of Love), Eichi Publishing 2006
2. Nana ni Koi-shite (ナナに恋して / Falling in Love with Nana), Saibunkan Publishing 2007
3. Rainbow (レインボー), Takeshobo 2007
4. Nana Fushigi (ナナ不思議 / The Seven Wonders of Nana), GP Museum Soft 2007
5. Nure-doki (濡時間 / Wet Time), Goma Books 2008
6. Toriko (とりこ / Enslaved), Outvision 2009
