= Liza Kennedy =

Japanese model

Liza
- Born: Liza Kennedy; July 5, 1989 (age 36); Hamburg, West Germany
- Occupation: Fashion model
- Years active: 2004–present
- Modeling information
- Hair color: Black
- Eye color: Dark brown
- Agency: Signo
- Website: lizakennedy.com

Liza Kennedy (born July 5, 1989), better known by her stage name Liza (often stylized as LIZA), is a Japanese fashion model.

== Early life ==
Liza Kennedy was born in Hamburg, Germany, to a Japanese mother and a Scottish German father. She went to a German school in Japan. Liza's background made her trilingual (English, German and Japanese).

== Career ==
At age 13, Liza was scouted as a model for JJ and started modeling for the magazine. After that, she became an exclusive model for the Oggi magazine.

She released the first DVD, Liza, on Pony Canyon in 2007.

As a fashion model, Liza has appeared in Tokyo Girls Collection in 2009, 2010, 2011 and 2012.

She has also been a presenter for several television programs such as Terebi de Doitsugo, Another Sky and Kiseki Taiken! Unbelievable.
