= Office lady =

Female pink-collar employee

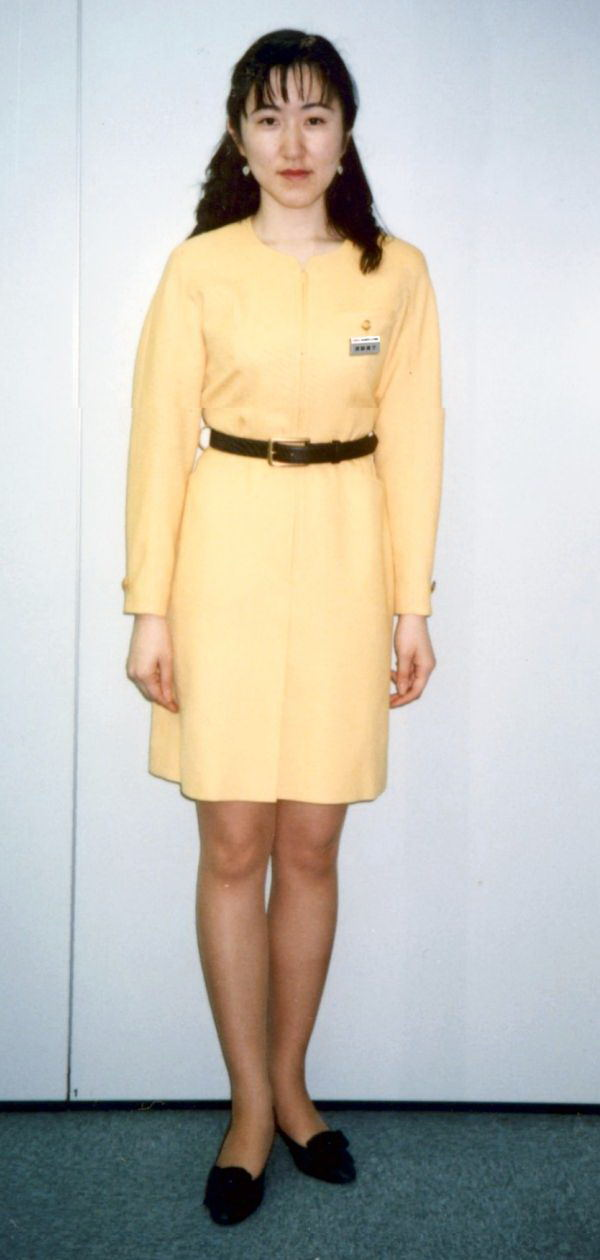
A Japanese woman in work uniform (c. 2000s)

An office lady (Japanese: オフィスレディー, romanized: Ofisu Redī), often abbreviated OL (Japanese: オーエル, romanized: Ō Eru, pronounced [o̞ːe̞ɾɯ̟ᵝ]), is a female office worker in Japan who performs generally pink-collar tasks such as secretarial or clerical work. Office ladies are usually full-time permanent staff, although the jobs they perform usually have relatively little opportunity for promotion, and there is usually the tacit expectation that they leave their jobs once they get married.

Due to some Japanese pop culture influence in Mainland China, Taiwan and Hong Kong, the term is also in common usage there. However, the meaning of the word is slightly different. The term is also sometimes seen in Anglophone countries.

== History ==
The first female office workers in Japan are generally believed to have been employed by the Bank of Japan in 1888 and by Mitsui Bank in 1893. From the Taishō era (1912-1926) to the early Shōwa era, the term shokugyō fujin (職業婦人, "working woman") was used to refer to women employed in tertiary-sector occupations, including professional, clerical, corporate, and sales positions. During this period, women became increasingly employed in professional and public-service occupations, including medicine (as female physicians), education, government service, and transportation.

By 1920, women accounted for more than 10% of salaried employees and were commonly referred to as office girls. From 1920 onward, industrial rationalization, the expansion of the service sector, and the spread of Western culture contributed to the diversification of women's employment. Women increasingly entered occupations such as office work, Western-style hairdressing, typing, and elevator operation, and the number of working women grew rapidly, particularly by the 1940s.

In 1924, the Tokyo City Social Affairs Bureau conducted a survey of 900 working women employed as teachers, typists, office workers, shop assistants, nurses, and telephone operators. The survey found that these occupations represented the principal forms of employment for women in urban areas at the time. From the late Taishō era onward, the naming convention "-girl" became fashionable for referring to women in particular occupations. Examples included bus girls (female bus conductors), shop girls or department store girls (department store sales clerks), and Marubiru girls (women employed in the Marunouchi Building).

=== Post-war era ===
The rise in OLs began after World War II, as offices expanded. They were first known as "BGs" (for "Business Girls"), but it was later found that English-speakers used a similar acronym, B-girls, to refer to "bargirls". Josei Jishin, a women's magazine, ran a competition to find a better name for the business girls. OL was chosen in 1963 from the entries.

In the 1980s, being an OL was the most common job for Japanese women, and OLs made up approximately one-third of the female work force.

OL stock characters are frequently found in josei manga and anime, often portrayed as attractive, clever, and wistful individuals bored with their jobs, over-pressured by their families, and facing psychological issues.

== Sex discrimination ==
Especially in the late 20th century, OLs were often depicted as passive and submissive because they did not seem to care about strong sex discrimination against them in the workplace. Many OLs were well educated, yet they were still treated as low-skilled clerical workers, and the fact that OLs were usually responsible for serving tea to office leaders and male employees in the workplace indicates the existence of sexual discrimination against OLs in major Japanese corporations.

OLs were expected to leave the company after they married. The employers, therefore, are reluctant to spend extra money to train OLs.

However, many OLs are content with their position and wages in the company because a great number of them live with their parents and do not have to worry about their daily expenses. Thus, they can spend all their salaries on travelling or luxury goods.

== Employment ==
The Japanese female labor force participation rate has been increasing since 1960. In 1995, almost 40 percent of people in the labor force were women. The age patterns of employed males and females differed vastly. 75 percent of females in their early twenties are employed, and the percentage drops significantly after they reach their late twenties and early thirties, when most of them get married and start raising a family. (The percentage dropped to 55 percent for females in their early thirties.) There is also a tendency for women older than 34 to return to the labor force in a part-time job, which makes the labor force participation rate increase for females after their mid thirties. Males, on the other hand, are attached continuously to the labor market after they get a job in their early twenties. Therefore, the labor force participation rate for males remains high (95%) in their 30s, 40s and early 50s.

It is noteworthy that almost one third of all female employees in 1995 had clerical jobs; most of them were OLs. But the proportion is much smaller for males: only 15 percent of all employed males had clerical jobs. Although many women work in offices, they still have many fewer opportunities for promotion than males. Only 1% of female employees are managers or officials; in contrast, this figure is almost one-seventh for males.

== Hierarchy structure and tension ==
In Japanese companies, tenure is crucial: it determines not only employees' wages but also their positions in the company. Employees with shorter tenure have to show respect to those with longer tenure.

The word dо̄ki is used to describe the relationship between those who enter the company in the same year or have the same length of tenure. If two employees are dо̄ki, they are assumed to have equal position. Similarly, senpai (one's senior) and kо̄hai (one's junior) are also commonly used to show the hierarchy in Japanese companies.

A junior female employee has to use polite terms such as desu and masu when she speaks to her senpai. Senpai, on the other hand, can speak casually with their kо̄hai.

If tenure is the only standard that determines one's position in the group as well as in the company, everything will be straightforward. However, the difference in education that OLs receive causes tension between them. OLs who are college graduates may have higher official ranks than those who are high school graduates, even if the latter have longer tenure.

Sometimes, due to the difference in their education, a kо̄hai may have a higher official rank, as well as wage, than their senpai. As a result, the kо̄hai is unwilling to be deferential to their senpai, while the senpai feels it unfair that they receive lower pay. In her 1998 book Office Ladies and Salaried Men: Power, Gender, and Work in Japanese Companies, author Yuko Ogasawara argues that if OLs do not get along with each other in the workplace, they cannot unite together to fight against gender discrimination.

== See also ==
- Salaryman
- Kyariaūman
- Women in Japan
