= Rinka (model) =

Japanese model and tarento

- 梨花
- Born: Chieko Nenaka; 21 May 1973 (age 53); Tokyo, Japan
- Occupations: Model; Tarento
- Years active: 1993–
- Style: Fashion
- Height: 165 cm (5 ft 5 in)

Rinka (梨花; born 21 May 1973, in Sumida, Tokyo) is a Japanese fashion model and tarento. Her real name (and maiden name) is Chieko Nenaka (根中 千恵子, Nenaka Chieko).

Rinka is represented with Stardust Promotion. She graduated from Tokyo Girls' School Junior High and High School. Rinka also attended a dental hygienist vocational school.

== Awards ==
Year	Award	Notes	Ref.
2006	Hair Coloring Award Grand Prix	Hosted by Hoyu	

== Filmography ==
=== TV dramas ===
Year	Title	Role	Network
1999	The Laughing Salesman	Ranmaru	TV Asahi
2000	Daisuke Hanamura	Yoshiko Todai	KTV
2000	Shinjuku Bōsō Kyūkyū-tai	Tomoko Kanamitsu	NTV

=== Films ===
Year	Title	Role
2001	Shadow	
2005	Irasshaimase, Kanja-sama.	Takumi

=== Variety programmes ===
Year	Title	Network	Notes
	Sekaiichi Uketai Jugyō	NTV	
1993	Yoru mo Isshō kenmei.	NTV	Regular
	Magical Zunō Power!!	NTV	
2005	Waratte Iitomo!	Fuji TV	Tuesday regular
2006	London Hearts	TV Asahi	Quasi-regular
	Ningen! Kore de ī noda	TBS	
2007	Shūmatsu no Cinderella: Sekai! Dangan Traveler	NTV	MC

=== Radio programmes ===
Year	Title	Network	Notes
2000	Ore-tachi yatte māsu	MBS Radio	Personality with Yasushi Ishida and Wakana Sakai

=== TV advertisements ===
Year	Title	Notes	Ref.
2005	Sony Computer Entertainment PlayStation Portable Soft "Fukufuku no Shima"		
2006	Kirin Beverage "Nuda"		
2006	Kanro "Puregumi"		
2007	Kao Corporation Sofina Aube		
2008	Kao Corporation Emal		
2010	SoftBank Disney Mobile	Image character	
2010	Royal Collagen Mango Jelly		
2011	Coca-Cola Japan Kōchahanaden "Premium Tea Latte", "Royal Milk Tea"		
2013	Kao Corporation Essential		
2014	Asahi Food & Healthcare "Placenta Keshōmizu Suhada shizuku"		
2015	Buyma "Sekai o Kaeru Tobira", "Rinka×Bag"		
2015	Shiseido Aqualabel		
2016	Fashion Media Appli "Toplog"		
2016	Ezaki Glico "Bitte"		

== Discography and works ==
=== Singles ===
As Rinka (梨花)※All out of print

Year	Title	Tie-up
1993	"Tsuki no Biyaku"	Suzutan advert song
1995	"Jirettai yo ne"	

As Rinka

Year	Title	Tie-up	Notes
2006	"XXX (Millions kisses)"	Iromelo Mix DX / mu-mo TV advert song	Topped 30th at Oricon
2007	"Maria / smile"	"Maria": Kanna-san Taiseikōdesu! Japanese version theme song; Enatame Catch Plus ending theme; "smile": Puregumi advert song	"Maria": Blondie cover

=== Jewellery ===
Title	Notes
jupiter Gold Label	Started in 2005, jewellery that was started by Rinka

== Bibliography ==
=== Photo albums ===
Year	Title	Code
1997	On the r. - Rinka, arinomama.	ISBN 978-4-8211-2129-8
2002	Gekkan Rinka	ISBN 978-4-10-790108-8
2005	Sweet Season	ISBN 978-4-7897-2722-8

=== Magazines ===
Year	Title	Notes	Ref.
2015	Otona Muse	Exclusive model	

=== Essays ===
Year	Title	Code
2006	Rinka	ISBN 978-4-7966-5530-9

== See also ==
- hitomi (singer) – Rinka co-starred in hitomi Japanese girl collection 2005–Love.Music.Love Fashion–. Also, she talked about hitomi's photobook.
