= Bis (magazine) =

Japanese fashion magazine

- Categories: Teenage fashion
- Founded: 2001
- Company: Kobunsha
- Country: Japan
- Based in: Tokyo
- Language: Japanese

Bis is a fashion magazine directed at teenage women published in Japan by Kobunsha. The magazine is an affiliate of the magazine JJ. It ceased regular operations and became an irregular publication in 2026.

== History ==
The magazine was first published in 2001 as JJ Bis, intended as a version of JJ for a younger audience. The magazine was renamed to Bis in 2006. Due to low sales, the magazine went out of print after the June 2006 edition, but was restarted in September 2017. Haruna Nakagōri (中郡暖菜), former editor of the magazine LARME, was named editor in chief.

Bis ceased regular publication with the Winter 2026 issue, released on December 1, 2025, as its final regular issue, and switched to an irregular publication schedule. Affiliated models Yūki Yoda, Miku Kanemura, and Ayame Tsutsui graced the cover. The official website was scheduled to cease operations in March 2026.
