= Ryō Tamura (comedian) =

Japanese comedian (born 1972)

- 田村 亮
- Born: 8 January 1972 (age 54); Takatsuki, Osaka, Japan
- Education: Osaka Prefectural Akutagawa High School
- Occupations: Comedian; stage speaker; stage actor
- Years active: 1994–
- Agent(s): Yoshimoto Creative Agency (Yoshimoto Kogyo, -Jan 9th, 2020) →LondonBoots (Jan 10th, 2020-)
- Style: Conte
- Television: Current; Ran × Suma: Machi no Kaze ni Nare; Former; Itadaki Muscle!
- Height: 172.9 cm (5 ft 8.1 in)
- Partner: Atsushi Tamura (London Boots Ichi-gō Ni-gō)

Ryō Tamura (田村 亮, Tamura Ryō; born 8 January 1972, in Takatsuki, Osaka) is a Japanese comedian who performs tsukkomi (sometimes boke) and writes the gags for the comedy duo London Boots Ichi-gō Ni-gō. His partner in the duo is Atsushi Tamura.

== Career ==
In June 2019, Tamura, alongside other Yoshimoto Kogyo affiliated comedians, was suspended from activities for appearing at yakuza-run parties. Tamura had also accepted ¥500,000 from the yakuza. Although the hard ban on the Tamura was lifted on August 19, he remained inactive in the industry until January 10, 2020, when it was announced that he will be returning as a talent under the agency London Boots, under an exclusive contract with Yoshimoto.

== Personal life ==
Tamura is represented with Yoshimoto Creative Agency through Yoshimoto Kogyo in Tokyo up until January 9, 2020. He transferred to the personal agency London Boots, created by his comedic duo partner Atsushi Tamura on January 10, 2020. He graduated from Osaka Prefectural Akutagawa High School.

== Filmography ==
=== TV programmes ===
==== Current appearances ====
Year	Title	Network	Ref.
	Katte ni Bangumi Jack	Fishing Vision	
	Ran × Suma: Machi no Kaze ni Nare	NHK BS1	
	Aisha Tengoku! Custom Garage	BS Sky PerfecTV!	
2016	Satahapi Shizuoka	SATV	
2016	Harajuku Abema News	AbemaTV	
2016	Okaberu	KTV	

==== Former appearances ====
Year	Title	Network
2010	Takarasagashi Adventurer: Nazotoki Battle Tore!	NTV
	Chokotto Īkoto: Okamura hon kon shiawase Project	TV Tokyo
2012	Puri Puri	MBS

=== TV dramas ===
Year	Title	Role	Network	Notes
2006	Kōmyō ga Tsuji	Shimazu Toyohisa	NHK	Taiga drama
2015	Scoop: Yūgun Kisha Kyoichi Fuse	Fumi Kanzaki	TBS	

=== Films ===
Year	Title	Role
2015	Mr. Max Man	Kengo Shimauchi
2017	Uchu Sentai Kyuranger the Movie: Geth Indaver Strikes Back	Hoi Korol/Geth Indaver

=== Anime films ===
Year	Title	Role	Ref.
2011	Gekijō-ban Anime: Nintama Rantarō: Ninjutsu Gakuen: Zenin Shutsudō! no Dan	Kessai Tekata	

=== Radio ===
Title	Network
Battle Night Ryo Kick or Chop	Bay FM

=== Advertisements ===
Brand	Product
House Foods	Sawayaka Toiki
Nintendo	The Last Story

=== Video games ===
Title	Role
Beavis and Butt-Head in Virtual Stupidity	Beavis

=== Magazines ===
Title	Publisher
Daytona	Neko Publishing
