= Osaka Shoin Women's Junior College =

Coordinates: 34°33′04″N 135°40′08″E

- 大阪樟蔭女子大学短期大学部
- Type: Private; Junior college Women's college
- Active: 1987–2013
- Location: Kashiba, Nara, Japan
- Website: www.osaka-shoin.ac.jp/jc/index.html

The Osaka Shoin Women's Junior College (大阪樟蔭女子大学短期大学部, Ōsaka Shōin Joshi Daigaku Tanki Daigakubu) was a private women's junior college in the city of Kashiba, Nara, Japan.

== History ==
The junior college was founded in 1987, and closed in 2013.
