= London Boots Ichi-gō Ni-gō =

Japanese comedy duo

- London Boots Ichi-gō Ni-gō (ロンドンブーツ1号2号)
- Employer: Yoshimoto Kogyo

Comedy career
- Years active: 1993–
- Members: Ryō Tamura (Tsukkomi); Atsushi Tamura (Boke)

Notes
- Same year/generation as: Bananaman; Kazutoyo Koyabu; Penalty; Cowcow

London Boots Ichi-gō Ni-gō (ロンドンブーツ1号2号, meaning "London Boots #1 #2") are a Japanese comedy duo (kombi) that originally performed manzai-style stand-up, but now are mainly known for their TV appearances and as hosts of a handful of off-the-wall variety shows.

The two members are Atsushi Tamura (田村淳) and Ryō Tamura (田村亮), and though they have the same surname, there is no relation and they in fact come from very different backgrounds. Atsushi is from the Yamaguchi Prefecture, and speaks with the standard accent of someone from Tokyo. Ryō, on the other hand, is from Takatsuki, Osaka, and speaks in a sometimes faltering Osaka dialect.

== Members ==
- Atsushi Tamura (田村淳) Born December 4, 1973 in Hikoshima, Shimonoseki, Yamaguchi. Plays the boke. The #2 of London Boots #1 #2, he is known for his style of talking out of context and leading others off-topic to create comedic effects. Atsushi appears more often as the talkative one of the duo, and acts as the MC for numerous television programs.
- Ryō Tamura (田村亮) Born January 8, 1972 in Takatsuki, Osaka. Plays the tsukkomi. The #1 of London Boots #1 #2, He is known for his docile personality and style of tsukkomi.

== History ==
The two met through independent comedy groups in Tokyo, and eventually coupled and began performing on the highly populated streets of Shibuya. They auditioned to enter Yoshimoto Kogyo in 1994 at the same time as Penalty and DonDokoDon and were accepted by the company. After appearing on Ucchan Nanchan's "UN Factory Kabosuke", they quickly found fame as they were recognized as two very talented manzai-shi (stand-up comedians). Though Ryō was most passionate about creating new manzai neta and arranging manzai acts, the much louder Atsushi began to see the potential of TV and his own ability to adapt to it. By the late 1990s, London Boots, or Lonboo (ロンブー, ronbū) as they are often called in Japan, had already landed a spot as the hosts of their own show.

== Style ==
Ryo and Atsushi take very different approaches to their humor; while Atsushi will often wield his quick-witted comedic sense at his guests' expense, Ryō appears much more polite, attempting (often unsuccessfully) to correct Atsushi's behavior. (Atsushi has revealed Ryō's sexual trysts at various fuuzoku locations on the air, though Ryō is married and has children.) Ryō tends to speak with a mixed Osaka and Tokyo dialect (for example: それ、あかんだろ (sore, akan daro), mixing akan, common in the Kansai dialect, with daro, most common in standard Japanese), which only serves to accentuate his efforts at being polite. The irony of this situation is that Atsushi is supposed to be the boke and Ryō the tsukkomi, which suggests a reversal of their comedic roles.
