= Classy (magazine) =

Japanese women's magazine

- February 2010 issue
- Categories: Fashion
- Frequency: Monthly
- Founded: 1984
- Company: Kobunsha
- Country: Japan
- Based in: Tokyo
- Language: Japanese
- Website: https://classy-online.jp/

Classy Magazine is a monthly Japanese women's magazine. Its title, Classy, is derived from the English adjective classy. It is estimated that the average reader of Classy magazine is between the age of 24 and 28. The magazine is known to be popular with office ladies (widely known as OL in Japan). It is also popular among university students as a magazine for Onekei (お姉系) fashion.

== History ==
Classy was first published in 1984. The magazine is published by Kobunsha.

The magazine targets women in their 20s. It is a sister magazine of JJ, and has been published since 1984 by the same company. The two magazines are closely linked, and often, models who posed for JJ magazine in their youth will return a few years later to model for Classy.

== Models ==
In the magazine's early days, most of the models were American supermodels, however changes in the policy led to the inclusion of more and more local models. Famous Japanese supermodels, namely Anna Umemiya and Kyoko Aoyama started their modeling careers by appearing as cover girls in the magazine.

Several well-known models are working for the magazine. Hiroko Hatano, who used to work for JJ magazine, started to work as a model here in 2005. Jessica Michibata, Sayo Aizawa and Ryoko Tanami are also popular.
