= Yoshie Takeuchi (announcer) =

Japanese announcer (born 1986)

- 竹内 由恵
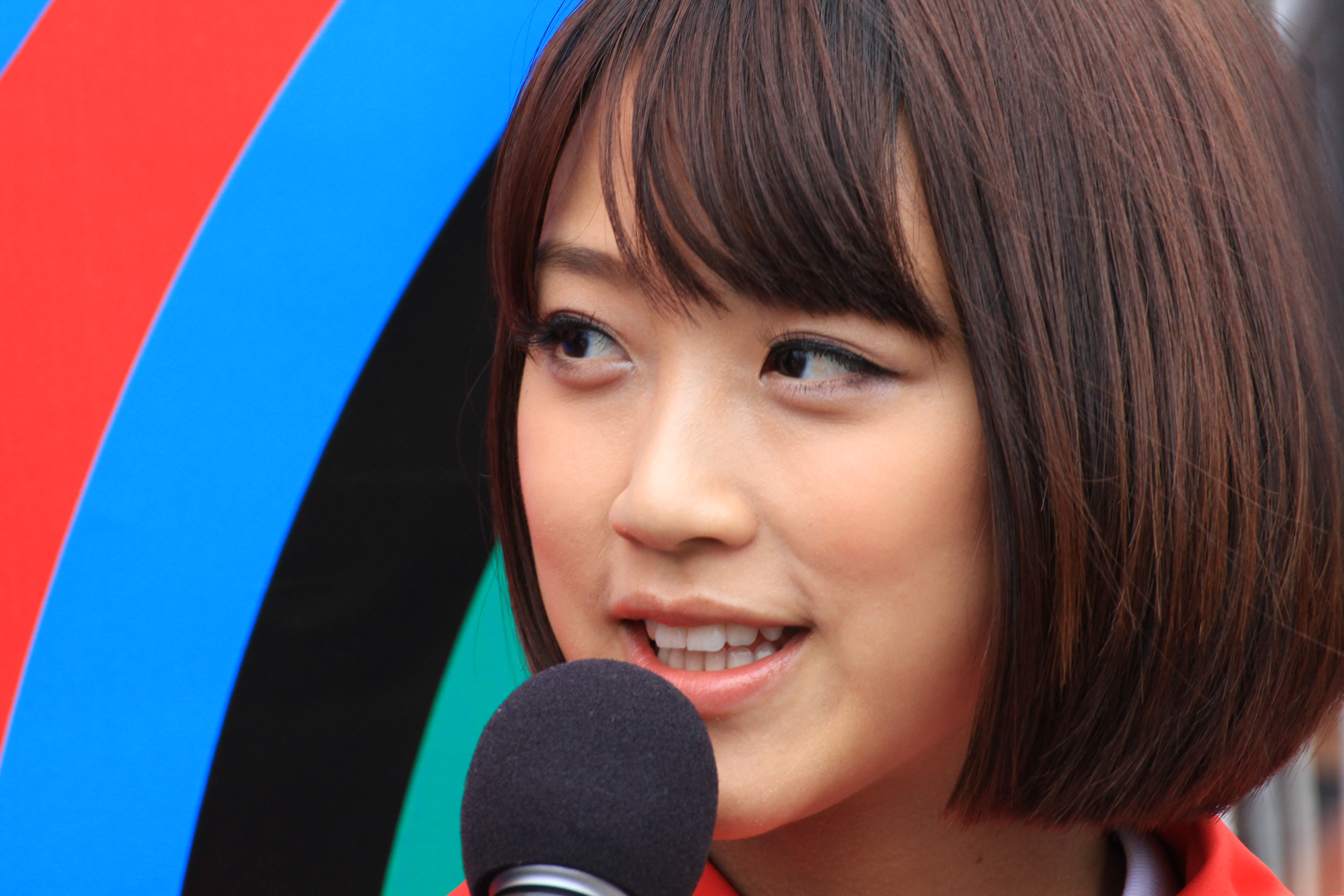
- 竹内由恵 ロンドンチャレンジ March 2012
- Born: January 20, 1986 (age 40); Tokyo, Japan
- Education: law graduate
- Alma mater: Keio University
- Occupation: Television announcer
- Years active: 2008–present
- Employer(s): TV Asahi (2008–2019); Amuse, Inc. (2020–present)
- Children: 2

Yoshie Takeuchi (竹内 由恵, Takeuchi Yoshie; born January 20, 1986) is a freelance announcer in Japan. She is a former announcer for TV Asahi.

== Background ==
Yoshie Takeuchi was born in Tokyo Prefecture. Due to her father's job, she lived abroad between the ages of 10 and 15. After returning to Japan, she graduated from Tokyo Gakugei High School and enrolled in the political science department of Keio University School of Law.

In 2006, she was the winner of a Miss Keio contest, a highly publicized annual event at the university.

== Career ==
After graduating from Keio University, Takeuchi joined TV Asahi in April 2008, co-hosting Music Station with Tamori from October 2008.

She is one of the five announcers on the cross-media "EZ News EX" service provided to mobile phones by TV Asahi, Asahi Shimbun, and KDDI.

== Programs ==
- Music Station
- Super J Channel
- Hodo Station (Sunday)
- Yabecchi FC
- Get Sports
- Okazu no Cooking
- Rakugomono
- ANN News
- News Access (BS Asahi)
