= Yū Tejima =

Japanese actress (born 1982)

- 手島 優
- Born: 27 August 1982 (age 44); Ashikaga, Tochigi, Japan
- Other names: Tejī (てじー); Tejima (てじま)
- Education: Ashikaga Tateyama Side Junior High School
- Occupations: Gravure idol; actress
- Years active: 2004–present
- Agents: To-Win; Platinum Production
- Height: 1.65 m (5 ft 5 in) (2013)
- Spouse: unknown (m. 2022)
- Children: 1
- Awards: Young Jump "Pururun Senshuken" Shodai Champion (2004); NTV Genic 2008; Zak The Queen 2008-nendo Grand Prix

Yū Tejima (手島 優, Tejima Yū; born 27 August 1982, (Note: She was once mistaken that she was born in 1984, but it was fixed in 2012 when she revealed her actual age.) in Ashikaga, Tochigi, Japan) is a Japanese gravure idol, tarento, and actress. Tejima is represented with To-Win, and later Platinum Production.

== Publications ==
=== Videos ===
Year	Title
2004	Impulse
2004	You & I
2005	pure peach
2005	Eight
2006	Deep Kiss Otome...
2007	With you
2007	I ga Ippai
2007	Iyashi no Megami
2008	NTV Genic 2008: Yuu Tejima Hot Lips
2009	Big Love
2010	Yuu Tejima no Reirei na Onna
2010	Yuu×Waku
2010	Na-i-sho
2011	Tejī Nau
2011	Ikenai? Nichijō
2011	Anata Konomi
2015	Otetsuki

== Filmography ==
=== TV series ===
==== Informational and variety ====
Year	Title	Network	Notes
2006	Odds On TV! Dart Channel: Uma no Ko TIM	Green Channel	
	Pachinko-Pachisuro Dai Bōken Janbari: Kogane Hall ni Nemuru Hihō	Sun TV	
2009	Venus Search	TBS	Regular appearances
2009	Gold House	Fuji TV	
2009	Hikomaro no B-kyū Gourmet Tengoku	Foodies TV	
2010	Aimai Na!	TBS	Semi-regular appearances
2010	Sunday Japon	TBS	Quasi-regular appearances
2011	Shikaku Habataku	NHK-E	August appearances
2012	Tochigi Hatsu! Tabi Suki!	GYT	Regular appearances

==== Dramas ====
Year	Title	Role	Network	Notes
2009	7 Man-ri Tantei Nitobe	Cavan Joran (Maiko)	TV Asahi	Episode 2
2010	Unubore Deka	Haruka Sakurai	TBS	Episode 5
2011	Misaki Number One!!	Reika	NTV	
2011	Motto Atsui zo! Nekokegaya!!	Yu Ide	NBN	
2011	Watashi wa Shadow	Misaki Watanabe	TBS	Episode 7
2012	Soumatou Kabushikigaisha	Sayaka Nakata	TBS	Episode 2
2013	Shuden Bye Bye	Otsuka	TBS	Episode 6
2014	Smoking Gun	Karin Uemura	Fuji TV	Episode 9

=== Advertisements ===
Title
Japan Racing Association Kyoto Racecourse
Uniqlo Aki-Fuyu Collection
Nippon Telegraph and Telephone Flet's Hikari Fibre
Mitsubishi Estate Eco-Clean
Baki the Grappler
Sony PlayStation Sinple Girls
Derusa the Max

=== Films ===
Year	Title	Role	Notes
2007	Akōkurō	Ako	
2008	Dark Love: Rape	Kaede Uchida	Lead role
2009	Onechanbara	Aya	Lead role

=== Radio ===
Year	Title	Network
2008	Radio Charity Musicthon	STV Radio
2009	Madamada Gocha Maze! Atsumare Yanyan	MBS Radio
2010	Gocha Maze! Nichiyōbi	MBS Radio
2011	All Gaitame Navi!	Radio Nikkei

=== Internet programmes ===
Year	Title	Website
2011	Koikatsu: Renai Know How Talk Live Vol. 2	Mache Variety

=== Mobile ===
Title	Website
Idol ga Ippai	Aipai

=== Video games ===
Year	Title	Role	Ref.
2010	Kurohyō: Ryū ga Gotoku Shinshō	Yuu Tejima	

=== Direct-to-video ===
Year	Title	Role	Notes
2008	Super Mask Heroine: Minerva Yuuki Bitoh	Misaki Natsumori	
2008	Super Mask Heroine: Minerva Misaki Natsumori	Misaki Natsumori	
2008	Bakunyu Senta Pairanger	Koyo	
2009	Shōakuma Butterfly: Jō-ō e no Michi	Kyoko / Hikaru	Lead role
2010	Ladies vs. Warumen		
2012	Mukōbuchi 9: Kō Rate Ura Mājan Retsuden Asashō		
2012	Mukōbuchi 9: Kō Rate Ura Mājan Retsuden Ura Dora		

=== Stage ===
Year	Title
2012	Ī Uso, Warui Uso

== Bibliography ==
=== Photo albums ===
Year	Title
2004	Angel Fruits
2009	Wild Venus
2010	Thank Yuu!
2012	tejima

=== Magazines ===
Title
Weekly Young Magazine
Weekly Young Jump
Weekly Playboy
Weekly Young Sunday
Weekly ASCII
Weekly Asahi Geinō

=== Serialisations ===
Year	Title
2010	Shukan Jitsuwa "Relay Column: Hime-gokoro"
	Company?
