= Kobunsha =

Japanese publishing company

Kobunsha Co., Ltd.
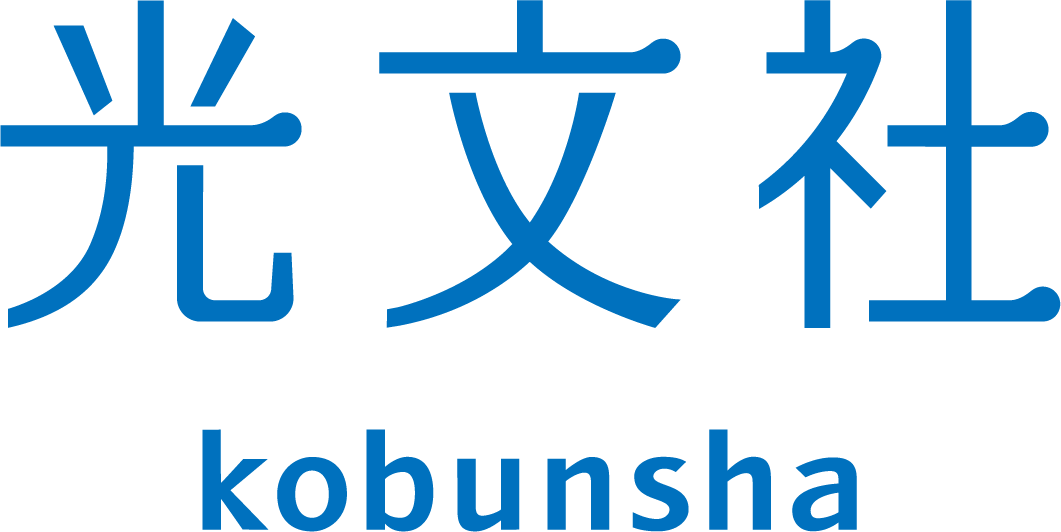

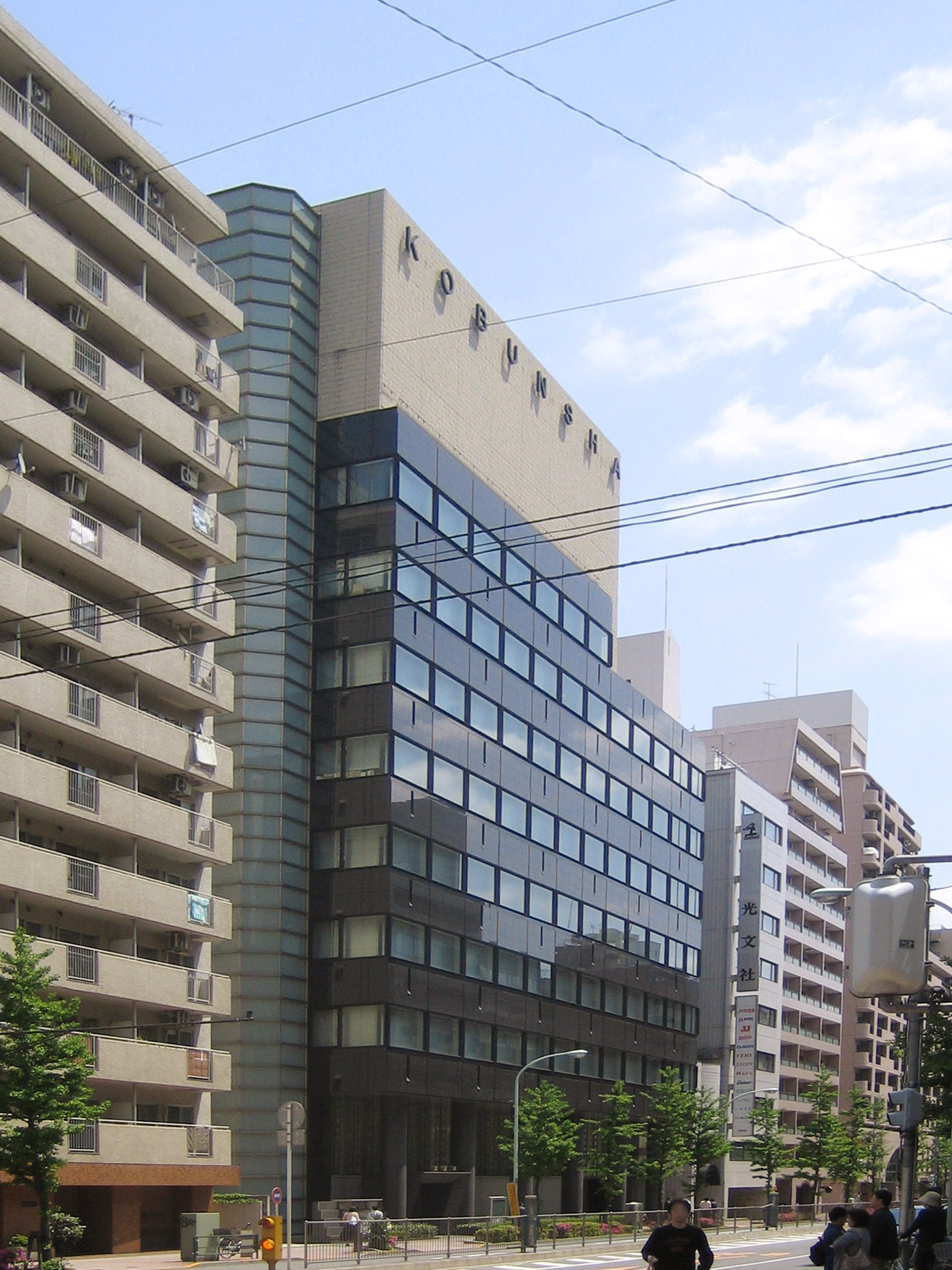
- Headquarters in Bunkyō, Tokyo
- Native name: 株式会社光文社
- Romanized name: Kabushiki-gaisha Kobunsha
- Company type: Private
- Industry: Publishing
- Founded: October 1, 1945; 80 years ago
- Headquarters: Bunkyō, Tokyo, Japan
- Products: Books; Magazines; Comics
- Owner: Kodansha (45.8%)
- Website: www.kobunsha.com

Kobunsha Co., Ltd. (株式会社光文社, Kabushiki-gaisha Kobunsha) is a Japanese publishing company. It publishes literature, manga novels, and women's magazines.

== Company history ==
Kobunsha was established on October 1, 1945, and belongs to the Kodansha group.

The company has published Japanese authors such as Tetsuya Honda, Keigo Higashino, Jiro Akagawa, Miyuki Miyabe and Arimasa Osawa and foreign authors such as Arthur C. Clarke, Jean Genet, Malcolm Gladwell, Jon Ronson, JD Vance, Hanya Yanagihara and Zhao Ziyang.

In 1975, Kobunsha published the women's magazine JJ, known as the earliest established women's magazine for college students in Japan.

From 1994, it established the Kobun Foundation and began publishing more mystery novels. The Foundation has been awarding a Grand Prize for Best Mystery Novels each year.

Kobunsha currently publishes women's magazines such as JJ, Classy and JJ Bis.

== Books and magazines published by Kobunsha ==
=== Women's magazines ===
- JJ
- Bis—a version of JJ magazine targeted at women aged between 15 and 19.
- Classy—a version of JJ magazine targeted at women aged between 24 and 28.
- Very
- Story
- Mart
- Josei Jishin
- Comic PitTo (コミックピット!) - Women's comic magazine

=== Men's magazines ===
- Gainer
- Brio
- Pro Wrestling Album

=== Other magazines ===
- Shōnen
- Giallo
- Flash
- Shousetsu Houseki

=== Magazines no longer published ===
- Hoseki
- Shukan Hoseki
- VS.

=== Literary book series ===
- Chie No Mori Bunko
- Kappa Novels
- Kobunsha Bunko (English, "Kobunsha Paperback Library")
- Kobunsha Koten Shin'yaku Bunko (光文社古典新訳文庫) (English, "Kobunsha New Translations of Classics Library") (2006)
- Kobunsha Paperbacks
- Kobunsha Shinsho (English, "Kobunsha New Books [i.e. trade paperback]")

=== Manga ===
- Koubunsha Girl Comic Series
- Koubunsha BL Comic Series
- Hinotama Game Comic Series

=== Manga anthologies ===
- Megane de Suit
- BL Shouji Shinnyuu Shainsan Irasshai!!
- Shinsengumi anthology Hana to Ran

== See also ==
- Kodansha
