= Gota Yashiki =

Japanese musician (born 1962)

- Born: 26 February 1962 (age 63); Kyoto, Japan
- Genres: Acid jazz, rock, pop
- Occupation(s): Musician, arranger
- Instrument(s): Drums, bass guitar
- Years active: 1982–present
- Member of: Simply Red, Kokua
- Website: gota.com

Gota Yashiki (屋敷 豪太, Yashiki Gōta), born 26 February 1962, is a Japanese musician. He performs an independent acid jazz artist and drum/bass player, and was a member of English band Simply Red.

== Biography ==
Born in Kyoto, Japan, on 26 February 1962, where at a young age he learned how to play traditional Japanese drums, he moved to Tokyo in 1982 to join a reggae/dub band that became known as Mute Beat. Together with Mute Beat band member Kazufumi Kodama, he worked on various projects and formed the duo Kodama & Gota.

From 1986 on, Yashiki entered the European music scene, collaborating with numerous well-known artists, including Soul II Soul, Sinéad O'Connor and Seal, while also working on film soundtracks and re-mixes.

Yashiki joined Simply Red in 1991 for the recording of the album Stars and the following world tour. In late 1993, he released an album titled Somethin' to Talk About under the name Gota & The Heart of Gold, and helped fellow Simply Red band member Heitor T.P. release a solo album in 1994. While still working regularly with various European artists, including an album by singer-songwriter Chris Braide, he recorded another album as Gota & The Low Dog in 1995 with singer Warren Dowd. This album, named Live Wired Electro, was released in several countries and took him on his first solo Japanese tour. Alanis Morissette credits Yashiki as "Groove Activator" on her album Jagged Little Pill, for which samples of his works were used. Also, the English electronic dance music producer Chicane used his drum samples, most prominent on the Chicane Mix of the Bryan Adams song Cloud Number Nine. He also made Here We Go, the theme song of J1 League team Nagoya Grampus in 1992, when the team was still known as Nagoya Grampus Eight.

In 1997, he released his first album in the United States titled It's So Different Here. The albums hit single was a top ten Smooth Jazz track of the year. The album went to No. 15 on the Billboard 200, and No. 1 on the R&R chart. He also assisted Depeche Mode in the studio in 1997, appearing on their eagerly awaited 1997 album Ultra. Yashiki then helped produce Simply Red's album titled Blue the following year in 1998 and subsequently assisted the following year's release Love and The Russian Winter. He released two albums in 1999, the first titled Let's Get Started, and the second titled Day & Night. Also that year he collaborated with the English musician Mike Oldfield in his album The Millennium Bell, in the track titled "Mastermind" as the drummer. His album The Best of Gota was released in 2002, and he worked on a joint project with Freemasons member and British producer James Wiltshire called B.E.D. (Beyond Every Definition) in the early 2000s. In 2004, to celebrate the first centenary of FIFA, he made some arrangements to the anthem composed by Franz Lambert in 1994 and is the one heard in all the FIFA officially sanctioned matches since then.

In 2006, he was part of a special unit called Kokua with Shikao Suga, Takebe Satoshi, Takamune Negishi and Hirokazu Ogura to sing Progress, the theme song of NHK's Professional Shigoto no Ryuugi (プロフェッショナル 仕事の流儀; known overseas as The Professionals). They reunited in 2016 to celebrate the 10th anniversary of the single, making an album, Progress, and having a Nationwide tour.

In March 2008, Yashiki formed the rock band Vitamin-Q along with Masami Tsuchiya, Kazuhiko Katō, Rei Ohara and Anza. However, after Katō's suicide on 17 October 2009, the fate of the group is uncertain.
