= 19-sai no Uta =

Single by Mao Abe
- Released: October 27, 2010
- Genre: Rock, J-pop
- Length: 3:54
- Label: Pony Canyon
- Songwriter: Mao Abe
- Producer: Takamune Negishi

Mao Abe singles chronology
"Lonely" (2010)	"19-sai no Uta" (2010)

"19-sai no Uta" (19歳の唄, Jūkyū-sai no Uta; "Song at 19") is a song by Japanese singer-songwriter Mao Abe, released on November 3, 2010.

== Composition and inspiration ==
The song is an upbeat rock song, arranged by music producer Takamune Negishi. This was Abe's first time to work with Negishi. Abe chose this song to become a single because of its stronger rock sound compared to her previous works (especially in comparison to songs such as "Free," which were much more pop-rock).

The song was written by Abe in 2009, when she was 19, however was recorded and released when she was 20. During this time, Abe was dealing with the stresses of being a musician, such and was performing on her tour Mao Abe Live No. 1 and in recording sessions for her album Pop. During this time, Abe found she could not write songs she considered good since her debut, as opposed to those written in high school.

The lyrics of the song are autobiographical, about Abe's state of mind at 19. The song deals with her feelings of insecurity, impatience and conflict of not being considered a child or an adult. Abe considers the song a condensation of the resentment and chaos she felt while under stress as a musician.

The single also features the B-sides "Ai ni Iku" and "Morning," though initially four songs were planned for the single. Abe described "Ai ni Iku" as a "painful pop tune" and a "straightforward love song." It was based on real experiences, where Abe was trying to keep up a long-distance relationship while having no money. During the writing process, Abe wrote the music and lyrics entirely separately. The self-guitar backed track "Morning" was described by Abe as being about a man's other connections outside of love, such as work and friends. Abe started the song from the lyric "Ashita wa dare no moto e yuku no?" (明日は誰の元へ 行くの?; "Who will you go to tomorrow?") which she wrote down while visiting a friend's house. At the end of 2008 she wrote the song properly, finishing writing the lyrics spontaneously, something she had never done before.

== Promotion ==
For promotion of the single a special cellphone-only site abema-rally.jp was set up. The site was a social networking game, in which people received points for sending messages to their friends. The top 50 posters were invited to a special exclusive live event.

Abe was featured in many music and fashion magazines to promote the single. These included publications such as CD&DL Data, Hanachu, Junon, Musica, Ori Star, Papyrus, R25, Rockin' On Japan, What's In? and Zipper. She also went on the Tokyo FM radio show School of Lock! on November 1 to promote the single.

Abe's fourth tour, the 16 date Mao Abe Live No. 2, began on the same day as the physical release of the single. On the first date at Ōita, she performed the song live for the first time.

== Music video ==
Mao Abe in the music video.

The music video was directed by Choku, and shot on October 6, 2010. It features Abe performing the song with a band in a darkened, smoky room. As they perform, different types of lights such as strobe lights and klieg lights light the band as they perform.

== Track list ==
All tracks are written by Mao Abe.

No.	Title	Arranger	Length
1.	"19-sai no Uta"	Takamune Negishi	3:54
2.	"Ai ni Iku" (逢いに行く "Going to Meet You")	Yūichi Komori	4:01
3.	"Morning"	Mao Abe	5:00
Total length:			13:02

== Chart rankings ==
Chart	Peak position
Billboard Japan Adult Contemporary Airplay	6
Billboard Japan Hot 100	8
Oricon daily singles	13
Oricon weekly singles	20
RIAJ Digital Track Chart Top 100	68

=== Reported sales ===
Chart	Amount
Oricon physical sales	6,000

== Release history ==
Region	Date	Format
Japan	October 13, 2010	Ringtone
Japan	October 27, 2010	Digital download
Japan	November 3, 2010	CD Single, rental CD
