= Itsu no Hi mo =

2010 song by Mao Abe

Single by Mao Abe

from the album Pop
- B-side: "Give Me Your Love," "Watashi wa Anata ga Ii no Desu"
- Released: 6 January 2010 (digital download); 13 January 2010 (physical)
- Genre: J-pop, pop rock
- Length: 5:15
- Label: Pony Canyon
- Songwriter: Mao Abe
- Producer: Yūichi Komori

Mao Abe singles chronology
"'Anata no Koibito ni Naritai no Desu'" (2009)	"Itsu no Hi mo" (00000001)	"'Lonely'" (2010)

"Itsu no Hi mo" (いつの日も; "Everyday") is a song by Mao Abe. It was released as Abe's third single on 13 January 2010, as the lead single from her second album Pop, two weeks before the album's release.

The song was certified by the RIAJ as gold for cellphone downloads. As this is her only single to receive any kind of certification to date, this makes "Itsu no Hi mo" her most successful.

== Writing ==
The song is a love ballad. The protagonist of the song, on the verge of a break-up, expresses how happy she feels right now, and wishes that every day she can look back and remember her relationship how it is today. She expresses her devotion: she feels as is she were born to be beside her lover, and will strive to find her lover in her next life.

Abe wrote the song in September 2009, and is autobiographical. She wrote it as a chance to be able to say good-bye to her boyfriend at the time. She created the theme of the song after realizing that at that point in her life, she treasures that person more than she ever will again, so she should save these memories. She also considered the mortality of people, and decided she should use up her love for that person on the friends and family around her.

== Music video ==
Abe in the music video.

The music video was shot by director Masaki Ohkita. It depicts Abe standing before an apple tree. She attempts to take one of the apples, and cannot quite reach it (even on tip-toes). She then begins to cry, and snow falls on her. Abe returns to the tree later, when it is now leafless, snow-covered and all of the apples have fallen.

The song is nominated for the Best New Artist Video at the MTV Video Music Awards Japan 2010

As of 20 April 2010 the music video has been viewed over 573,000 times on popular video-sharing website YouTube.

== Release ==
The single was announced three months before its release. It was originally intended to be released a week before, on 6 January. It was chosen to be used as the ending theme song for the Fuji TV documentary variety talk show Ethica no Kagami: Kokoro ni Kiku TV (エチカの鏡～ココロにキクTV～, Ethica's Mirror: TV that Listens to Your Heart), from 11 October onwards.

The single was released digitally on 6 January 2010. It was released physically a week later, on the 13th. The physical release had two versions: a limited edition CD+DVD version, as well as a standard CD only version. The DVD features the music video for "Itsu no Hi mo."

In December the song's lyrics were released to official Japanese online lyric databases. At one of these sites, Uta-Net, the lyrics were the most accessed on its weekly access ranking. This was her second successive song to do this, after Anata no Koibito ni Naritai no Desu.

The B-side "Give Me Your Love" was used as the Ski Jam Katsuyama ski field commercial song. Her song My Baby from her debut album Free had previously been used for this tie-up in the 2008-2009 ski season. In April 2010, the song was announced to be used as the NHK business show Mezase! Kaisha no Hoshi's opening theme song.

== Reception ==
After charting lowly for five weeks, "Itsu no Hi mo" reached at #2 on the Billboard Japan Hot 100 due to heavy rotation on radio stations. This was her second best position on the chart, since "Free" in January 2009. The song stayed at #2 for another week, during its physical release, before falling out of the top 10.

The song performed well in the digital market. It debuted at #6 on the RIAJ digital tracks chart (which tracks full-length downloads to cellphones) after it was released a week earlier than the physical edition. The single charted for a total of five weeks in the top 20 (mostly around the #13 position), and in the top 100 for nine weeks.

The song debuted at #9 on Oricon's daily charts, her highest position in her career to date (though Pop beat this record, reaching #3). It reached #12 in the weekly charts, selling 5,000 in its first week. The song eventually sold 9,000 copies, outselling her previous single "Anata no Koibito ni Naritai no Desu," but not "Tsutaetai Koto/I Wanna See You."

In April 2010 the song was certified by the RIAJ for gold (100,000 copies) as a full-length cellphone download.

Critically, CDJournal reviewed the song, feeling that they felt it "spoke to girls' sympathies." They praised the song's "rising refrain" section as the strong point of the single.

== Track listing ==
All tracks are written by Mao Abe.

No.	Title	Arranger	Length
1.	"Itsu no Hi mo"	Yūichi Komori	5:15
2.	"Give Me Your Love"	Yūichi Komori, Masakazu Andō	4:12
3.	"Watashi wa Anata ga Ii no Desu (私は貴方がいいのです; "I Think You're Good")"	Mao Abe	3:20
4.	"Itsu no Hi mo" (inst.)	Yūichi Komori	5:15
Total length:			18:02

DVD track listing
No.	Title	Length
1.	"Itsu no Hi mo" (music video)	5:26

== Chart Rankings ==
"Itsu no Hi mo"
A sample of the chorus of "Itsu no Hi mo," and some of a preceding verse.

=== Oricon Charts (Japan) ===
Release	Chart	Peak position	First week sales	Sales total	Chart run
13 January 2010	Oricon Daily Singles Chart	9			
13 January 2010	Oricon Weekly Singles Chart	12	5,368	9,216	5 weeks
13 January 2010	Oricon Yearly Singles Chart				

=== Various charts ===
Chart	Peak position
Billboard Japan Hot 100	2
Billboard Adult Contemporary Airplay	1
RIAJ Digital Track Chart Top 100	6
RIAJ Digital Track Chart yearly top 100	85
