= Notebook II: Bōken Note-chū =

Studio album by Kurumi Enomoto
- Released: January 21, 2009
- Recorded: 2007–2009
- Genre: J-pop
- Length: 1:15:23
- Label: For Life
- Producer: Mor, Motoo Fujiwara, Kurumi Enomoto

Kurumi Enomoto chronology
Notebook I: Mirai no Kioku (2007)	Notebook II: Bōken Note-chū (2009)	Anata ni Tsutaetai (2009)

Singles from Notebook II: Bōken Note-chū
- 1. "Real/She" Released: October 17, 2007; 2. "Yūhi ga Oka/Minna Genki" Released: December 19, 2007; 3. "Mirai Kinenbi" Released: February 20, 2008; 4. "Yesterdays (Taisetsu na Okurimono)" Released: October 22, 2008; 5. "Bōken Suisei" Released: November 26, 2008; 6. "Emerald" Released: January 2009 (radio single)

Notebook II: Bōken Note-chū (NOTEBOOK II～冒険ノート中～, Mid-Adventure Notes, pronounced Nōtobukku Tsū Bōken Note-chū) is Kurumi Enomoto's second studio album, released on January 21, 2009. It debuted at #43 on the Japanese Oricon album charts, and charted in the top 300 for four weeks.

The album was preceded by five singles, though "Bōken Suisei", the preceding single and ending theme song for the anime Tales of the Abyss, was the only that charted. Three other songs had tie-ins: "Real" (リアル) was used as the NHK-FM radio show Music Square (ミュージック・スクエア)'s 2007 October/November ending theme song, "Mirai Kinenbi" (未来記念日, Future Day to Remember) was used as the CDTV March ending theme song as well as sharing a title with Enomoto's cellphone serialised novel, and "Yesterdays (Taisetsu na Okurimono)" (イエスタデイズ～大切な贈りもの～, Yesterdays (Important Present)) was used as Kubota Takashi-directed film Yesterdays' theme song.

The song "Emerald" (エメラルド) was released as a radio single at the time of the album's release, reaching #83 on the Billboard Japan Singles Top 100 chart. No music video was produced, however.

The album features 11 previously released songs from singles, along with four new tracks. All of the songs (not counting the bonus hidden tracks) from the "Yūhi ga Oka/Minna Genki", "Mirai Kinenbi" and "Bōken Suisei" singles feature on the album, though not "She" from the "Real/She" single. "Cure", a B-side on the "Real/She" single is featured on the album with a complete new arrangement.

The album's title is a pun: Bōken Note-chū (冒険ノート中, Mid-Adventure Notes) sounds like Bōken no Tochū (冒険の途中, On the Way to an Adventure), one of the lyrics from "Bōken Suisei".

== Track listing ==
No.	Title	Writer(s)	Length
1.	"Note"	Kurumi Enomoto, Mor	0:38
2.	"Real (リアル)"	Kurumi Enomoto, Mor	5:02
3.	"Bōken Suisei (冒険彗星, Adventure Comet)"	Mor, Motoo Fujiwara	5:52
4.	"Emerald (エメラルド)"	Kurumi Enomoto, Mor	5:09
5.	"Episode I"	Kurumi Enomoto, Mor	4:31
6.	"Mirai Kinenbi (未来記念日, Future Day to Remember)"	Kurumi Enomoto, Mor	4:47
7.	"Asagao (朝顔, Morning Glory)"	Mor, Motoo Fujiwara	5:08
8.	"Santa wa Inai n desu. (サンタさんはいないんです。, There's No Santa.)"	Kurumi Enomoto, Mor	2:12
9.	"Phantom (ファントム)"	Kurumi Enomoto, Mor	3:14
10.	"Yūhi ga Oka (夕陽が丘, Sunset Hill)"	Kurumi Enomoto, Mor	5:20
11.	"Yesterdays (Taisetsu na Okurimono) (イエスタデイズ～大切な贈りもの～, Yesterdays (Important Present))"	Kurumi Enomoto, Mor	5:19
12.	"Kinō no Mirai (昨日の未来, Yesterday's Future)"	Kurumi Enomoto, Mor	5:59
13.	"Minna Genki (みんな元気, Everyone's Fine)"	Kurumi Enomoto, Mor	4:26
14.	"Amefuri Kozō (雨降り小僧, Little Kid in the Rain)"	Kurumi Enomoto, Mor	2:58
15.	"Boku no Uta (ぼくのうた, My Song)"	Mor, Motoo Fujiwara	6:58
16.	"Book"	Kurumi Enomoto, Mor	0:51
17.	"Cure"	Kurumi Enomoto, Mor	7:07

== Japan sales rankings ==
Release	Chart	Peak position	First week sales	Sales total
January 21, 2009	Oricon Daily Albums Chart	28		
January 21, 2009	Oricon Weekly Albums Chart	43	3,303	6,241
