= Notebook I: Mirai no Kioku =

Studio album by Kurumi Enomoto
- Released: May 16, 2007
- Recorded: 2006–2007
- Genre: J-pop
- Length: 53:58
- Label: For Life Music
- Producer: Takamune Negishi

Kurumi Enomoto chronology
Notebook I: Mirai no Kioku (2007)	Notebook II: Bōken Note-chū (2009)

Singles from Notebook I: Mirai no Kioku
- 1. "Kokoro no Katachi" Released: April 19, 2006; 2. "Uchiage Hanabi" Released: July 19, 2006; 3. "Rainbow Dust" Released: October 18, 2006; 4. "Aisubeki Hito" Released: March 21, 2007

Notebook I: Mirai no Kioku (NOTEBOOK I～未来の記憶～, Future Memories, pronounced Nōtobukku Wan Mirai no Kioku'') is Kurumi Enomoto's debut studio album, released on May 16, 2007. It debuted at #70 on the Japanese Oricon album charts, and charted in the top 300 for a single week.

The album was preceded by four singles, though only two charted. These two, "Rainbow Dust" and "Aisubeki Hito", were theme songs for minor dramas (Sweets Dream, and the Fuji TV mudra internet streaming drama Aisubeki Hito respectively).

== Track listing ==
No.	Title	Writer(s)	Length
1.	"Subarashii Sekai (素晴らしい世界, Wonderful World)"	Kurumi Enomoto, Mor	5:59
2.	"Rainbow Dust"	Kurumi Enomoto, Mor	5:37
3.	"Rasen no Kioku (螺旋の記憶, Spiral Memories)"	Kurumi Enomoto, Mor	5:48
4.	"Hymn"	Takamune Negishi	0:45
5.	"Speedway (スピードウェイ)"	Kurumi Enomoto, Mor	4:01
6.	"Merry-Go-Round (メリーゴーランド)"	Kurumi Enomoto, Mor	3:58
7.	"Kokoro no Katachi (心のカタチ, Shape of My Heart)"	Kurumi Enomoto, Mor	5:37
8.	"Jungle Gym (ジャングルジム)"	Kurumi Enomoto, Mor	5:08
9.	"Togirenaki Baton (とぎれなきバトン, Unstopped Baton)"	Kurumi Enomoto, Mor	3:55
10.	"Aisubeki Hito (愛すべき人, Someone I Should Love)"	Kurumi Enomoto, Mor	4:22
11.	"Catch Ball (キャッチボール)"	Kurumi Enomoto, Mor	4:36
12.	"Uchiage Hanabi (打ち上げ花火, Skyrockets)"	Kurumi Enomoto, Mor	4:12

== Japan sales rankings ==
Release	Chart	Peak position	First week sales	Sales total
May 16, 2007	Oricon Weekly Albums Chart	70	1,785	1,785
