= Lonely (Mao Abe song) =

Single by Mao Abe
- B-side: "Get My Way," "S.O.S"
- Released: June 9, 2010
- Genre: J-pop, pop rock
- Length: 3:54
- Label: Pony Canyon
- Songwriter: Mao Abe
- Producer: Masakazu Andō

Mao Abe singles chronology
| "Itsu no Hi mo" (2010) | "Lonely" (2010) | "19-sai no Uta" (2010) |

"Lonely" (ロンリー, Ronrī) is Japanese singer-songwriter Mao Abe's fourth physical single, released on June 9, 2010. Unlike her previous singles and albums, this release is only released in one version.

== Promotion ==
The song was used in a commercial for Calpis Water, starring Umika Kawashima and Hannya member Satoshi Kaneda. The commercial began broadcasting on April 2, 2010. In mid-May 2010, the lyrics of the song were posted to Uta-Net. The song quickly reached #1 on the daily lyrics access ranking, Abe's third song to do this (after "Anata no Koibito ni Naritai no Desu" and "Itsu no Hi mo") On June 13, Abe performed the song on NHK music show Music Japan.

== Music video ==
Abe in the music video.

The music video was shot by director Hideaki Fukui. It switches between two views of Abe: one where she stands in front of a light brown background as staff members fuss over her appearance. The second is when the background falls away and she performs the song with a band. The type of band switches between two types: a standard four piece band, with guitars and a drum set, and a marching band-style line of men in gaucho hats and marching drums, with two men swinging flags behind them. After the marching band performance, the scene changes to that of Abe sitting on a chair playing her acoustic guitar. As she sits up and performs into the microphone, the room is filled with the members of both types of band.

The music video consists of only three shots: from the start until Abe is fussed over a second time, a short clip filmed from a hand-held camera during this, and from this point until the finale.

== Reception ==
The song began by charting lowly on Billboard's Japan Hot 100 and Adult Contemporary Airplay charts for several weeks. Eventually it would peak at #5 and #4 on these charts respectively. On Oricon's physical singles chart, it debuted at #22 in its first week, selling 6,700 copies. it debuted at #19 a week before its wide release on RIAJ's Digital Track Chart.

== Track listing ==
All songs written by Mao Abe.

| No. | Title | Arranger | Length |
|---|---|---|---|
| 1. | "Lonely (ロンリー, Ronrī)" | Masakazu Andō | 3:54 |
| 2. | "Get My Way" | Andō | 4:23 |
| 3. | "S.O.S" | Mao Abe | 4:05 |
| 4. | "Lonely (Inst.)" | Andō | 3:54 |
| Total length: | | | 16:24 |

== Chart rankings ==
| Chart | Peak position |
|---|---|
| Billboard Japan Hot 100 | 5 |
| Billboard Adult Contemporary Airplay | 4 |
| Oricon daily singles chart | 15 |
| Oricon weekly singles chart | 22 |
| RIAJ Digital Track Chart Top 100 | 19 |

=== Reported sales ===
| Chart | Amount |
|---|---|
| Oricon physical sales | 9,500 |
