= Bōken Suisei =

Single by Kurumi Enomoto

from the album Notebook II: Bōken Note-chū
- Released: November 26, 2008
- Genre: J-pop
- Length: 6:00
- Label: For Life Music
- Songwriters: Mor, Motoo Fujiwara
- Producers: Mor, Motoo Fujiwara

Kurumi Enomoto singles chronology
"'Yesterdays (Taisetsu na Okurimono)'" (2008)	"Bōken Suisei" (2008)

"Bōken Suisei" (冒険彗星, Adventure Comet) is a song by Kurumi Enomoto, released as the fifth and final single from her second album Notebook II: Bōken Note-chū, two months before the album's release.

The song was used as the ending theme song for Tales of the Abyss, an anime adaption of the Namco role-playing video game of the same title. The single was produced by Motoo Fujiwara, lead vocalist of the band Bump of Chicken, and the band's producer and longtime collaborator with Enomoto, Mor. Bump of Chicken's song Karma was used as the original game's theme song, as well as the opening theme song for the anime.

The single was released in two versions: a limited edition featuring a DVD, plus a regular CD only version. The DVD features the music video for the song, along with an acoustic performance of it and a special animated video with clips from the anime. The CD+DVD limited edition featured a sticker with Abyss characters Luke and Asch, while the regular version featured a general themed Abyss sticker.

The B-sides of the single were also written by Mor and Motoo Fujiwara. This is the first release by Enomoto where she has no song writing input into the lyrics/music of all of the songs. All three songs appear on Enomoto's second album, Notebook II: Bōken Note-chū.

== Track listing ==
=== Single ===
No.	Title	Writer(s)	Arranger	Length
1.	"Bōken Suisei (冒険彗星, Adventure Comet)"	Mor, Motoo Fujiwara	Motoo Fujiwara	6:00
2.	"Asagao (朝顔, Morning Glory)"	Mor, Motoo Fujiwara	Motoo Fujiwara	5:08
3.	"Boku no Uta (ぼくのうた, My Song)"	Mor, Motoo Fujiwara	Motoo Fujiwara	6:59

=== DVD ===
No.	Title	Length
1.	"Bōken Suisei (Music Clip) (「冒険彗星」Music Clip)"
2.	"Bōken Suisei (Acoustic Special Live Clip) (「冒険彗星」アコースティック スペシャル ライブ映像)"
3.	"Bōken Suisei (Special Music Clip) (「冒険彗星」Special Music Clip)"

== Chart rankings ==
=== Oricon charts (Japan) ===
Release	Chart	Peak position	First week sales	Sales total
November 26, 2008	Oricon Daily Singles Chart	6		
November 26, 2008	Oricon Weekly Singles Chart	10	13,697	30,752
November 26, 2008	Oricon Yearly Singles Chart	371		

=== Various charts ===
Chart	Peak position	First week sales
Soundscan Single Top 20	16	8,511
Billboard Japan Singles Top 100	9	N/A
CDTV Top 100	10	N/A
