= Anata ni Tsutaetai =

EP by Kurumi Enomoto
- Released: October 21, 2009
- Recorded: 2009
- Genre: J-pop
- Length: 23:04
- Label: For Life Music

Kurumi Enomoto chronology
Notebook II: Bōken Note-chū (2009)	Anata ni Tsutaetai (2009)

Anata ni Tsutaetai (あなたに伝えたい, I Want to Tell You) is Kurumi Enomoto's first EP, released on October 21, 2009. It debuted at #131 on the Japanese Oricon album charts, and charted in the top 300 for two weeks.

This EP is the first time Enomoto has not worked with Bump of Chicken producer Mor since her debut under For Life Music.

The title track "Anata ni Tsutaetai" was used as a promotional track for this release, receiving a music video.

== Track listing ==
No.	Title	Writer(s)	Length
1.	"Anata ni Tsutaetai (あなたに伝えたい, I Want to Tell You)"	Kurumi Enomoto	5:02
2.	"Love Love Love Love!!"	Kurumi Enomoto, Yasuho Takayasu	4:00
3.	"Freedom (フリーダム)"	Kurumi Enomoto, Yasuho Takayasu	4:30
4.	"Strawberry Shanty (ストロベリーシャンティー)"	Kurumi Enomoto, Yasuho Takayasu, Hiroshi Aota	3:55
5.	"Shindō (振動, Vibration)"	Kurumi Enomoto, Hiroshi Kido	5:37

== Japan sales rankings ==
Release	Chart	Peak position	First week sales	Sales total	Chart run
October 21, 2009	Oricon Daily Albums Chart				
October 21, 2009	Oricon Weekly Albums Chart	131	992	1,414	2 weeks
October 21, 2009	Oricon Yearly Albums Chart				
