= Hirokazu Ogura =

Hirokazu Ogura 小倉博和
- Born: January 28, 1960 (age 66); Kagawa Prefecture, Takamatsu, Japan
- Occupations: guitarist, arranger, sound producer
- Years active: 1982–present
- Label: Victor/Speedstar
- Member of: Kokua
- Website: Hirokazu Ogura Official Website Hirokazu Ogura Official FB Page

Hirokazu Ogura (小倉博和, Hirokazu Ogura; born January 28, 1960) musician from Takamatsu. His interest in playing the guitar started in High School.

He has worked as a professional artist since 1982 as a guitarist and as a sound producer. His list of contacts includes Fujii Fumiya, UA, Rie Eto, Keisuke Kuwata, Taeko Onuki, Hiroshi Matsuda, Misia, Salyu, KinKi Kids, Mr.Children, Shikao Suga, among others

In 2006 he was part of a special group called Kokua, formed to sing the theme song to an NHK documentary. In 2016, the members of Kokua reunited to celebrate the release of that original single, Progress, and worked on the official 1st album for the group and a Nationwide tour, both named Progress.
