= Kurumi Enomoto =

Japanese singer-songwriter (born 1981)

Kurumi Enomoto 榎本くるみ
- Also known as: Kurumi (くるみ)
- Born: 17 October 1981 (age 45); Nagoya, Japan
- Genre: J-Pop
- Occupation: Singer-songwriter
- Instrument: Vocals
- Years active: 2002–present
- Labels: Nagare Records (2002); SME Records (2002–2003); Across the Pop Records (2005); For Life Music (2006–present)

Kurumi Enomoto (榎本 くるみ, Enomoto Kurumi; born 17 October 1981), formerly known as Kurumi (くるみ), is a Japanese singer-songwriter. She debuted in 2002 with the independently released single Moeru Taiyō (燃える太陽, Burning Sun). She is most well known for singing the ending theme song for the anime adaptation of the Namco role-playing video game Tales of the Abyss, "Bōken Suisei."

== Biography ==
Enomoto was born in Nagoya. She first gained an interest in music in late primary school. She joined the school band in her final year, and started listening to top 40-charts based Western music. She was particularly impressed by Madonna, though also liked such music as hard-rock bands. She wrote her first song on the piano in this period. It was called Maboroshi (幻, Phantom) and it expressed much of the unhappiness she felt at the time. She later resumed writing songs regularly when she was 19.

Two years later in August 2002, Enomoto released her first single, "Moeru Taiyō," under the independent label Nagare Records with the mononym Kurumi (くるみ). It was sold exclusively at six Tower Records stores, and managed to chart at No. 3 on the Sapporo store's instore independent single charts, as well as No. 8 on the total single charts at the Nagoya Kintetsu Pass'e store. In December of the same year, she debuted under SME Records as a major label artist. The first song she'd ever written, "Maboroshi," was released as her debut single, followed by "Color Ningen" in June. Neither single charted on Oricon charts' top 200 singles chart. After performing at a few live events throughout 2003, Enomoto ceased activity under Sony.

Enomoto did no musical activities in 2004, and in late 2005 released another independent single, "Yasashii Uta o Utaitai," under her full name. This led to her second major-label contract, this time with For Life Music. She re-debuted with the single "Kokoro no Katachi". Her music was most popular on Nagoya-based FM radio stations: her singles "Kokoro no Katachi" and "Uchiage Hanabi" reached #3 on the ZIP-FM airplay charts, and her third, "Rainbow Dust," reached No. 1. "Rainbow Dust" was used as the theme song for the drama Sweets Dream. These were followed by her debut album, Notebook I: Mirai no Kioku.

From October 2007 until February 2008, Enomoto released three singles, released successively every two months. The last of these, "Mirai Kinenbi," shared the title of Enomoto's cellphone serialised novel, released through cellphone site Orion at the same time as the single. The offer for Enomoto to write such a novel came to a surprise to her, as she was not an avid fiction reader, and did not consider herself to be an exceptional writer.

Enomoto's break came in late 2008, when she teamed up with Bump of Chicken vocalist Motoo Fujiwara to write the ending theme song for the anime adaptation of the Namco role-playing video game Tales of the Abyss. The resulting song was "Bōken Suisei," which went on to reach No. 10 on Oricon's singles chart, selling over 30,000 copies.

== Discography ==
=== Studio albums ===
Title	Album details	Peak chart positions	Sales
Title	Album details	JPN	Sales
Notebook I: Mirai no Kioku	Released: May 16, 2007; Label: For Life Music; Formats: CD, digital download, streaming	70	JPN: 2,000
Notebook II: Bōken Note-chū	Released: January 21, 2009; Label: For Life Music; Formats: 43, digital download, streaming	43	JPN: 6,000

=== Extended plays ===
Title	Album details	Peak chart positions	Sales
Title	Album details	JPN	Sales
Anata ni Tsutaetai	Released: October 21, 2009; Label: For Life Music; Formats: CD, digital download, streaming	131	JPN: 1,500

=== Singles ===
List of singles as lead artist
Title	Year	Peak chart positions		Sales	Album
Title	Year	JPN	JPN Hot 100 (Note: The Billboard Japan Hot 100 chart was established in 2008.)	Sales	Album
"Moeru Taiyō" (Note: Released under the name Kurumi)	2002	—			Non-album singles
"Maboroshi"	2002	—			Non-album singles
"Color Ningen"	2003	—			Non-album singles
"Yasashii Uta o Utaitai"	2005	—			Non-album singles
"Kokoro no Katachi"	2006	—			Notebook I: Mirai no Kioku
"Uchiage Hanabi"	2006	—			Notebook I: Mirai no Kioku
"Rainbow Dust"	2006	99		JPN: 1,000	Notebook I: Mirai no Kioku
"Aisubeki Hito"	2007	199		JPN: 300	Notebook I: Mirai no Kioku
"Real" / "She"	2007	—			Notebook II: Bōken Note-chū
"Yūhi ga Oka" / "Minna Genki"	2007	—			Notebook II: Bōken Note-chū
"Mirai Kinenbi"	2008	—	—		Notebook II: Bōken Note-chū
"Yesterdays (Taisetsu na Okurimono)"	2008	—	—		Notebook II: Bōken Note-chū
"Bōken Suisei"	2008	10	9	JPN: 30,000	Notebook II: Bōken Note-chū
"Hikari"	2024	—	—		Non-album single
"—" denotes a recording that did not chart or was not released in that territory.
