= Go (Kreva album) =

Album by Kreva

Studio album by Kreva
- Released: September 8, 2011
- Recorded: 2010–11
- Genre: Hip hop, electronic
- Length: 50:08
- Label: Pony Canyon
- Producer: Kreva (also exec.)

Kreva chronology
Shinzō (2009)	Go (2011)

Singles from Go
- 1. "Idome" Released: February 16, 2011; 2. "C'mon, Let's Go" Released: May 11, 2011; 3. "Kila Kila/Tan-Kyu-Shin" Released: July 20, 2011

Go is the fifth studio album by Japanese rapper Kreva, released through Pony Canyon on September 8, 2011. It is Kreva's first studio album in two years. The album's title, Go, is a word play on the Japanese word for five (五, go). Kreva explained, "It's my fifth album so I called it Go". Go produced three singles, including the top ten hit "Idome".

The album was released in three formats: limited CD+DVD edition, limited CD+T-shirt edition, and standard CD-only edition. The album's title is reiterated in the price of the CD+T-shirt edition (5,555 yen) as well as its catalog number (PCCA-9855).

== Background ==
Kreva described the album as an "ode to his fans". In a press release issued on August 1, 2011, he spoke about the album's direction:

I wanted to stop focusing on creating a story for each album. Up till now I always put a lot importance on getting the track list and order of songs perfect, but I realized that it made me want to recreate this perfection in concert and I couldn't shake it out of my head. With this album, I want to gain more freedom, break the rules and let go of my manners.

== Commercial performance ==
Go debuted at number 2 on the Oricon Daily Albums chart on September 6, 2011, selling 5,398 copies. The album climbed to number 1 the following day with 7,337 copies sold. It sold 5,840 copies on September 8 and 3,269 copies on September 9, remaining at number 1. On September 10, the album fell to number 2, with 2,978 copies sold, and then to number 4 on September 11. Despite remaining at number 1 for most of the week, Go peaked at number 2 on the Oricon Weekly Albums chart, selling 28,132 copies in its first week, 2,132 copies less than the second week sales of Ayumi Hamasaki's Five, which claimed the top spot. It dropped four spots to number 6 on its second week, selling 6,857 copies.

== Track listing ==
No.	Title	Lyrics	Music	Length
1.	"Kijun" (基準 "Basics")	Kreva	Kreva	2:18
2.	"Idome" (挑め "Challenge")	Kreva	Kreva	3:31
3.	"Kila Kila"	Kreva	Major Music a.k.a. Bastiany & HirOshima, Kreva	4:40
4.	"Shinkirō featuring Daichi Miura" (蜃気楼 "Mirage")	Kreva, Daichi Miura	Major Music a.k.a. Bastiany & HirOshima, Kreva	3:56
5.	"Jumon" (呪文 "Spell")	Kreva	Kreva	4:40
6.	"Runnin' Runnin'"	Kreva	Kreva	4:56
7.	"Hot Summer Days"	Kreva	Kreva	3:37
8.	"Bitansan Syndrome featuring Mao Abe" (微炭酸シンドローム Bitansan Shindorōmu "Fine Carbonic Acid Syndrome")	Kreva, Mao Abe	Goro Kumai, Kreva	4:37
9.	"Party wa Izuko?" (パーティーはIZUKO? Pātī wa Izuko? "Where's the Party?")	Kreva	Major Music a.k.a. Bastiany & HirOshima, Kreva	3:38
10.	"C'mon, Let's Go"	Kreva	Kreva	4:47
11.	"Egao" (EGAO "Smile")	Kreva	Kreva	4:22
12.	"Tankyūshin" (探究心 "Inquiring Mind")	Kreva	Kreva	4:22
Total length:				50:08

== Charts and sales ==
Chart (2011)	Peak position
Billboard Japan Top Albums	2
Oricon Daily Albums	1
Oricon Weekly Albums	2
