= Mao Abe =

Japanese singer-songwriter

Mao Abe 阿部 真央
- Also known as: Abema (あべま) (nickname)
- Born: Mao Abe; 24 January 1990 (age 36); Ōita, Japan
- Genres: Pop
- Occupation: Singer-songwriter
- Instruments: Acoustic guitar; vocals
- Years active: 2008–present
- Labels: Pony Canyon (2008–present); Yamaha Music Artist (talent agency) (2008–present)

Mao Abe (阿部 真央, Abe Mao; born 24 January 1990) is a Japanese singer-songwriter.

== Biography ==
Abe started learning the piano from age three, and from junior high school, she wanted to be a singer. She gave up the piano in favour of the guitar, wanting to be an acoustic pop singer/songwriter in the style of Canadian pop musician Avril Lavigne. While in high school, she frequently busked and attended music auditions. In February 2006, on a morning when she had truanted from school, she wrote her first song, "My Baby". Late in mid-2006, she entered the Yamaha Teens' Music Festival's Ōita regional contest on the recommendation of a musical instrument store manager, and performed "My Baby". She won the grand prize, and later entered the country-wide version, where she won an honourable mention prize after performing "Haha no Uta" (母の唄, Mother Song).

After finishing high school, she moved to Tokyo and was signed to the record label Pony Canyon. Abe performed at many live events, including some high-profile events like the Rock in Japan Festival. From August until November, four acoustic demos of Abe songs were released on iTunes. The third of these, "My Baby", was chosen as the October iTunes Single of the Week free download song.

Abe released her first album Free in January 2009. The eponymous title track was released as a radio single, and did extremely well on radio stations: Abe reached #1 on the Billboard Japan Hot 100 chart, despite only the airplay component counting towards her ranking (as opposed to airplay and physical sales, like most other releases).

Since the album, she has released three singles, the first two reaching the top 20 on the Oricon single charts. The third, "Itsu no Hi mo", reached #2 on the Japan Hot 100 chart, a week before the physical release of the single. The single was followed by her second album, Pop, which was her first top 5 album on the Oricon albums chart.

== Personal life ==
In January 2015, Mao Abe married Keisuke Iizuka, a former member of the band CORE OF SOUL who had worked as staff during her national tour. Later that year, in September 2015, the couple welcomed their first son. On March 1, 2018, Abe announced on her official website that she and Iizuka had divorced, describing the decision as one reached through mutual understanding.

== Discography ==
=== Studio albums ===
List of albums, with selected chart positions
Title	Album details	Peak positions		Sales (JPN) (Note: Sales provided by Oricon database and are rounded to the nearest hundred copies.)
Title	Album details	JPN	TWN East Asian (Note: The G-Music East Asian chart is a sub-chart, so releases listed may not have charted on the main top 20.) (Note: Position was taken from 2009 week 11 for Free.)	Sales (JPN)
Free	Released: January 21, 2009 (JPN); Label: Pony Canyon; Formats: CD, digital download	17	15	21,000
Pop	Released: January 27, 2010 (JPN); Label: Pony Canyon; Formats: CD, digital download	5	—	54,000
Su. (素。; "Naked")	Released: June 1, 2011 (JPN); Label: Pony Canyon; Formats: CD, digital download	6	—	41,000
Tatakai wa Owaranai (戦いは終わらない; "The Fight Is Not Over")	Released: June 6, 2012 (JPN); Label: Pony Canyon; Formats: CD, digital download	6	—	28,000
Anata o Suki na Watashi (貴方を好きな私; "The Me Who Likes You")	Released: August 28, 2013 (JPN); Label: Pony Canyon; Formats: CD, CD/DVD, digital download	7	—	17,000
Oppajime! (おっぱじめ!; "Start!")	Released: February 18, 2015 (JPN); Label: Pony Canyon; Formats: CD, CD/DVD, digital download	7	—	14,000
Babe.	Released: February 15, 2017 (JPN); Label: Pony Canyon; Formats: CD, CD/DVD, digital download	14	—	
YOU	Released: March 7, 2018 (JPN); Label: Pony Canyon; Formats: CD, CD/DVD, digital download	18	—	
Mada Ikemasu (まだいけます)	Released: January 22, 2020 (JPN); Label: Pony Canyon; Formats: CD, CD/DVD, digital download	14	—	4,300
Not Unusual	Released: February 15, 2023 (JPN); Label: Pony Canyon; Formats: CD, digital download	22	—	2,130
"—" denotes items that did not chart.

=== Compilation albums ===
List of albums, with selected chart positions
Title	Album details	Peak positions	Sales (JPN)
Title	Album details	JPN	Sales (JPN)
Single Collection 19—24 (シングルコレクション19-24, Shinguru Korekushon Naintīn Tuentifō)	Released: August 20, 2014 (JPN); Label: Pony Canyon; Formats: CD, CD/DVD, digital download	7	13,000
Abe Mao Rental Best: Koi no Uta-hen (阿部真央 レンタルベスト ～恋の唄 編～; "Mao Abe Rental Best: Love Song Edition")	Released: September 16, 2015 (JPN); Label: Pony Canyon; Formats: rental CD	—	
Abe Mao Rental Best: Ōenka-hen (阿部真央 レンタルベスト ～応援歌 編～; "Mao Abe Rental Best: Fighting Song Edition")	Released: September 16, 2015 (JPN); Label: Pony Canyon; Formats: rental CD	—	

=== Live albums ===
List of albums, with selected chart positions
Title	Album details	Peak positions	Sales (JPN)
Title	Album details	JPN	Sales (JPN)
5th Anniversary Abe Mao Live 2014 @ Nippon Budōkan (阿部真央らいぶ2014@日本武道館)	Released: March 11, 2015 (JPN); Label: Pony Canyon; Formats: CD, digital download	159	1,000

=== Singles ===
==== As a lead artist ====
List of singles, with selected chart positions
Title	Year	Peak chart positions		Sales (JPN)	Certifications	Album
Title	Year	JPN Oricon	JPN Hot 100 (Note: Sources for chart positions are as follows: "Free", "I Wanna See You", "Tsutaetai Koto", "Anata no Koibito ni Naritai no Desu", "Itsu no Hi mo", "Mada", "Lonely", "19-sai no Uta", "Motto", "Bitansan Syndrome", "Soba ni Ite", "Sekai wa Mada Kimi o Shiranai", "Tatakai wa Owaranai", "Saigo no Watashi", "Anata ga Suki na Watashi", "Tenshi wa Ita n da", "Believe in Yourself", "Sorezore Arukidasō".)	Sales (JPN)	Certifications	Album
"Tsutaetai Koto"	2009	19	11	13,300		Pop
"I Wanna See You"	2009	19	39	13,300		Pop
"Anata no Koibito ni Naritai no Desu"	2009	19	5	8,800	RIAJ (streaming): Gold	Pop
"Itsu no Hi mo"	2010	12	2	9,200	RIAJ (cellphone): Gold	Pop
"Lonely"	2010	22	5	9,500		Su.
"19-sai no Uta"	2010	20	8	6,000		Su.
"Mottō." (モットー。; "Mooore.")	2011	20	9	7,800		Su.
"Hikari" (光; "Light")	2011	20	—	7,800		Su.
"Soba ni Ite" (側にいて; "Come to Me")	2011	22	18	7,800		Tatakai wa Owaranai
"Sekai wa Mada Kimi o Shiranai" (世界はまだ君を知らない; "The World Still Doesn't Know You")	2012	22	11	6,600		Tatakai wa Owaranai
"Saigo no Watashi" (最後の私; "Me at the End")	2013	20	34	6,200		Anata o Suki na Watashi
"Anata ga Suki na Watashi" (貴方が好きな私; "The Me You Like")	2013	28	35	3,500		Anata o Suki na Watashi
"Boyfriend"	2013	28	—	3,500		Anata o Suki na Watashi
"Believe in Yourself"	2014	20	23	5,500		Single Collection 19—24 / Oppajime!
"Sorezore Arukidasō" (それぞれ歩き出そう; "Let's Walk Our Separate Ways")	2014	29	24	3,500		Oppajime!
"You Changed My Life"	2015	37	— (Note: Charted at number 32 on the Top Single Sales chart, and at number 63 on the Radio Songs sub-chart.)	2,000		Non-album singles
"Kimi no Uta"/"Kotae"	2019	35	—	1,200		Non-album singles
"—" denotes items that did not chart.

==== As a featured artist ====
List of singles, with selected chart positions
Title	Year	Peak chart positions	Album
Title	Year	JPN Hot 100	Album
"Bitansan Syndrome" (微炭酸シンドローム; "Soda Syndrome") (Kreva featuring Mao Abe)	2011	97	Go

==== Promotional singles ====
Title	Year	Peak chart positions	Album
Title	Year	Billboard Japan Hot 100	Album
"Hitomishiri no Uta" (人見知りの唄; "Shy Song")	2008	—	Free
"My Baby"	2008	—	Free
"Free"	2008	1	Free
"Mada" (未だ; "Still")	2010	23	Pop
"Tatakai wa Owaranai"	2012	27	Tatakai wa Owaranai
"Tenshi wa Ita n da" (天使はいたんだ; "There Was an Angel")	2013	83	Anata o Suki na Watashi
"Yasashii Kotoba" (優しい言葉; "Kind Words")	2015	— (Note: Charted at number 21 on the Adult Contemporary Airplay chart and at number 46 on the Hot Top Airplay chart.)	Oppajime!
"Haiagare My Way" (這い上がれ MY WAY; "Climb My Way")	2015	— (Note: Charted at number 53 on the Hot Top Airplay chart.)	Oppajime!
"—" denotes items that did not chart.

=== Video albums ===
List of media, with selected chart positions
Title	Album details	Peak positions	
Title	Album details	JPN DVD	JPN Blu-ray
Abe Mao Live No. 2 @ Zepp Tokyo (阿部真央らいぶNo.2@Zepp Tokyo)	Released: July 27, 2011; Label: Pony Canyon; Formats: DVD	33	—
Abe Mao Live No. 4 @ Shibuya Kōkaidō (阿部真央らいぶNo.2@渋谷公会堂)	Released: December 5, 2012; Label: Pony Canyon; Formats: DVD, Blu-ray	18	35
Abe Mao Live No. 5 @ Tokyo Kokusai Forum (阿部真央らいぶNo.5@東京国際フォーラム)	Released: March 19, 2014; Label: Pony Canyon; Formats: DVD, Blu-ray	45	41
5th Anniversary Abe Mao Live 2014 @ Nippon Budokan (5th Anniversary 阿部真央らいぶ2014@日本武道館)	Released: March 19, 2014; Label: Pony Canyon; Formats: DVD, Blu-ray	26	24

== Tours ==
- Abe Mao Live No. 0 (2009)
- Abe Mao Live No. 0.7 (2009)
- Abe Mao Live No. 1 (2010)
- Abe Mao Live No. 2 (2010)
- Abe Mao Live Natsu no Jin (2011)
- Abe Mao Live No. 3: Zepp to Quattro Dake de Gomen ne Tour (2011)
- Abe Mao Live No. 4 (2012)
- Abe Mao Hikigatari Live 2012 Fuyu: Christmas da yo! Kuru desho? Kuru yo ne!? no Maki (2012)
- Abe Mao Hikigatari Live 2013 Natsu (2013)
- Abe Mao Live No. 5 (2013)
- 5th Anniversary Abe Mao Live "Ochikarazoe, Negaimasu." Tour 2014 (2014)
- 5th Anniversary Abe Mao Live 2014 @ Nippon Budōkan (2014)
