= 0101 (album) =

Single by Shikao Suga
- Language: Japanese
- Released: November 15, 1995
- Genre: J-pop
- Label: Dig Up Label; Bounce Records

Shikao Suga singles chronology
"0101" (1995)	"Clover" (1997)

0101 is Shikao Suga's first single, and first indies single, released by Bounce Records (bounce-0015) on November 15, 1995. It was released under his real name (菅 止戈男). The song "Ai ni tsuite" would be included as part of the 4th single made under Office Augusta 2 years later.

== Track listing ==
0101 8cm CD single
No.	Title	Length
1.	"やがて(Yagate)"	3:28
2.	"あいとはいったい (Ai to wa ittai)"	4:11
3.	"愛について (Ai ni tsuite)"
4.	"愛について (Ai ni tsuite) (original demo tape)"	1:11
