= B.E.D. (duo) =

- Origin: England
- Genres: House, progressive house, electronic, downtempo, trip hop
- Years active: c. 2003–2007
- Label: BMG
- Past members: Gota Yashiki; James Wiltshire

B.E.D. (Beyond Every Definition) were an English electronic music duo consisting of Japanese musician Gota Yashiki and British producer James Wiltshire, which was mostly active in the early 2000s. They are primarily known for their collaborations with the vocalist Chloe Myers, including their only single, "Lay Me Down" (for which a music video was also made).

The group released just two albums with BMG (Ver. 1.0 and Ver. 1.5, the latter of which also contained several uptempo remixes of the first album's songs) and were featured on several dance music compilations with original compositions as well as the aforementioned single. Several of the songs on the group's debut album featured backing vocals and were written by English singer/songwriter Judie Tzuke.

While most of the duo's songs were both written and programmed by both Yashiki and Wiltshire, only Yashiki played other instruments on the tracks, including bass, guitar and drums. The group's song "Before I Leave" was also remixed by Wiltshire's more widely known duo, Freemasons; the remix was included as a bonus track on the Japanese version of Ver. 1.5.

== Discography ==
Albums

- Ver. 1.0 (2003)
- Ver. 1.5 (2004)

Single

- "Lay Me Down" featuring Chloe Myers (2003)
