= Kick the Can Crew =

Japanese hip hop group

- Origin: Japan
- Genre: Hip hop
- Years active: 1996–2004, 2017–present
- Labels: Lastrum; Burger Inn Records; Warner Music Japan; Speedstar Records
- Member of: Funky Grammar Unit
- Members: Little; MCU; Kreva
- Website: kickthecancrew.com

Kick the Can Crew is a mainstream hip hop group from Tokyo, Japan, consisting of members Kreva, MCU, and Little.

Formed in 1996, the group enjoyed popularity for their top singles "Good Music" and "Sayonara Sayonara". Warner/East West released their albums Vitalizer, Young Kings, a self-titled album, Magic Number, and a greatest hits CD.

Kick the Can Crew have made frequent appearances on Japan's music television station, Space Shower TV, since their debut.

Kreva, the main contributor to the band, won Japan's MC Battle three consecutive years, and has gone on to collaborate with several other groups, mainly Japanese ones, such as Hirai Ken.

In 2004, the group disbanded to concentrate on their respective solo careers. Kreva has been the most visible of the band since their break-up, releasing several singles and albums with great success.

The group reunited and released a new album called Kick! in 2017.

== Discography ==
=== Albums ===
List of albums, with selected chart positions
Title	Album details	Peak positions		Certifications
Title	Album details	JPN	JPN Hot	Certifications
Vitalizer	Released: February 14, 2002; Label: East West Japan; Format: CD, 2LP	3	—N/a	RIAJ: Gold
Magic Number	Released: January 1, 2003; Label: Warner Music Japan; Format: CD, 2LP	2	—N/a	RIAJ: 2× Platinum
Best Album 2001–2003	Released: November 19, 2003; Label: Warner Music Japan; Format: 2CD	1	—N/a	RIAJ: Platinum
Good Music	Released: January 1, 2004; Label: Warner Music Japan; Format: CD	11	—N/a	RIAJ: Platinum
Kick!	Released: August 30, 2017; Label: Speedstar Records; Format: CD, CD+DVD	3	3	
The Can	Released: March 30, 2022; Label: Victor Entertainment; Format: CD	19	18	

=== Singles ===
List of singles, with selected chart positions
Title	Year	Peak positions		Certifications	Album
Title	Year	JPN	JPN Hot	Certifications	Album
"Super Original"	2001	—	—N/a		Vitalizer
"It's Not Over"	2001	25	—N/a		Vitalizer
"Kankeri 01"	2001	40	—N/a		Vitalizer
"Lifeline"	2001	40	—N/a		Vitalizer
"Christmas Eve Rap"	2001	5	—N/a	RIAJ: Gold	Best Album 2001–2003
"Marché"	2002	9	—N/a		Vitalizer
"One Way"	2002	48	—N/a		Vitalizer
"Sayonara Sayonara"	2002	8	—N/a		Magic Number
"Unbalance"	2002	8	—N/a		Magic Number
"Chikyū Blues (337)"	2002	13	—N/a		Magic Number
"DJDJ (for Radio)"	2002	13	—N/a		Magic Number
"Toriiiiiico!"	2002	13	—N/a		Magic Number
"Stress"	2003	—	—N/a		Magic Number
"Saga Continue"	2003	11	—N/a		Good Music
"Good Music"	2003	9	—N/a		Good Music
"Punk Sunzen no Funk"	2003	12	—N/a		Good Music
"Navi"	2003	25	—N/a		Good Music
"Yure"	2003	25	—N/a		Good Music
"Nōnai Vacation"	2003	13	—N/a		Good Music
"1000%"	2017	—	81		Kick!
"Jūsho" (feat. Yasuyuki Okamura)	2018	19	28		
"—" denotes releases that did not chart or were not released in that region.
