= Kokua =

Japanese pop band

Kokua (コクア, stylized as kōkua) is a Japanese musical group formed in 2006 especially to sing "Progress", the title song to the NHK program Professional Shigoto no Ryūgi (プロフェッショナル 仕事の流儀), known overseas as "The Professionals".

== Members ==
The group comprises Shikao Suga (vocals, composition, lyrics), Satoshi Takebe (production, lyrics, keyboard), Hirokazu Ogura (guitar), Takamune Negishi (bass), and Gota Yashiki (drums).

== Discography ==
=== Singles ===
- Progress (August 2, 2006) - 『プロフェッショナル 仕事の流儀』(Professional Shigoto no Ryuugi) theme song

=== Albums ===
- Progress (June 1, 2016)
