= Free (Mao Abe song) =

Single by Mao Abe

from the album Free
- Released: December 2008 (radio single)
- Genre: J-pop
- Length: 3:52
- Label: Pony Canyon
- Songwriter: Mao Abe
- Producer: Yūichi Komori

Mao Abe singles chronology
"'I Wanna See You (AG Ver)'" (2008)	"Free" (2008)	"'Tsutaetai Koto/I Wanna See You'" (2009)

Free (ふりぃ, Furī) is a song by Mao Abe. It was released as the main promotional track from her debut album, Free, in January 2009. Free is an upbeat pop rock song. In the lyrics, the protagonist expresses her feelings about how free she feels, and how she 'isn't the good girl she was yesterday.'

== Release, promotion ==
The song had three tie-ups: it was used as the music countdown show CDTV January 2009 opening theme song (though it did not chart in the CDTV top 100), the music show Mashup! Musico's January ending theme song and the Glico Pocky commercial for special air on music video channel Space Shower.

The song was released to radio stations in late 2008. However, the song gained its most popularity in late January. Then, it reached #1 on the combined physical sales/airplay-based Billboard chart Japan Hot 100.

== Music video ==
Abe in the music video.

The music video was shot by director Masaki Ohkita, and shot in one day on November 22, 2008. The video begins showing Abe drawing spirals and patterns in the air with her finger (such as stars, or the song's name), before dawn at the Port of Kobe. Later, Abe performs the song with her band against the Kobe skyline. These two scenes are interspersed with shots of Abe singing the song in front of a wall of Marshall amplifiers.

As of April 20, 2010 the music video for Free has been viewed over 1,010,000 times on popular video-sharing website YouTube.

== Personnel ==
"Free"
A sample of the chorus of "Free."

- Mao Abe - acoustic guitar, songwriter
- Teppei Kawasaki - bass
- N.O.B.U!!! - background vocals
- Noriyuki Kisou - recording, mixing
- Yūichi Komori - arranger
- Tsuyoshi Miyagawa - drums
- Junko Sugawara - electric guitar

== Chart rankings ==
Chart	Peak position
Billboard Japan Hot 100	1
