= Kreva (musician) =

- Also known as: Doctor K DJ 908
- Born: Takashi Hatakeyama (畠山貴志); June 18, 1976 (age 50)
- Origin: Edogawa, Tokyo, Japan
- Genres: Pop rap, hip hop
- Occupations: Rapper-songwriter; emcee; music producer
- Years active: 1995–present
- Labels: Burger Inn Records, Knife Edge
- Member of: Kao PASS Brothers; By Phar The Dopest ストレスFree; The Three
- Website: kreva.biz

Takashi Hatakeyama (畠山 貴志, Hatakeyama Takashi; born June 18, 1976), better known by his stage name Kreva, is a Japanese rapper and record producer signed with the Burger Inn Records and Pony Canyon's Knife Edge labels. He is a solo artist as well as a member of various hip hop groups, including Kick the Can Crew, By Phar the Dopest with fellow MC Cuezero, and a large ensemble of other Japanese hip hop groups in Funky Grammar Unit.

His stage name is derived from the English word "clever".

== Music career ==
In September 2011, Kreva released his fifth album, Go. The album charted at number 2 on the Oricon weekly charts. Following the release of the album, Kreva began his first tour in two years, known as "Kreva Concert Tour 2012: Go". In June 2012, Kreva released his single "Oh Yeah!", which charted at number 8 on the Oricon weekly charts. The Japanese version of War (2007 film) uses "Strong Style" by him.

In 2014, Kreva adapted lyrics for the Japanese production of Broadway musical In the Heights. Following the success of the 2014 production, the musical was revived for an encore run in 2021.

== Discography ==
=== Studio albums ===
- Shinjin Kreva (新人クレバ) (2004)
- Ai Jibunhaku (愛・自分博) (2006)
- Yoroshiku Onegaishimasu (よろしくお願いします) (2007)
- Shinzō (心臓) (2009)
- Go (2011)
- Space (2013)
- Uso to bon'nō (嘘と煩悩) (2017)
- Sonzaikan (存在感) (2018)
- AFTERMIXTAPE (2019)
- LOOP END / LOOP START (2021)
- LOOP END / LOOP START (Deluxe Edition) (2022)
- Project K (2025)

=== Extended plays ===
- Oasys (2010)

=== Compilation albums ===
- Kreva no Best Ban (クレバのベスト盤) (2008)
- Japanese Rap Star for USA, Vol. 1 (2011)
- BEST ALBUM「KX」(2014)

=== Remix albums ===
- Best of MixCD No. 1 (2007)
- Best of MixCD No. 2 (2012)

=== Singles ===
- Kibō no Honō (希望の炎; Flame of Hope) (2004)
- Neiro (音色; Melody) (2004)
- Hitori Janai no yo (ひとりじゃないのよ; You're Not Alone) (2004)
- Funky Glamorous (ファンキーグラマラス) feat. Mummy-D (2005)
- Issai Gassai (イッサイガッサイ) (2005)
- Start (スタート) (2005)
- Kokuminteki Gyōji (国民的行事; National Event) (2005)
- "Have a Nice Day!" (2006)
- "The Show" (2006)
- Aggressive (アグレッシ部) (2007)
- Kureba Ii no ni (くればいいのに) (featuring Masamune Kusano) (2007)
- Strong Style (ストロングスタイル) (2007)
- "Magic" (with Toshinobu Kubota) (2007)
- Seikō (成功; Success) (2009)
- "I Wanna Know You" (2009)
- Umarete Kite Arigatō (生まれてきてありがとう) (featuring Yuu Sakai) (2009)
- "Nothing" (2009)
- Katte ni Remix Series (勝手にリミックスシリーズ) (2009)
- Blue (青, Ao) (2009)
- Red (赤, Aka) (2009)
- A to XYZ / Slow Beat (A to XYZ / スロウビート) (Toko Furuuchi and Kreva) (2009)
- Idome (挑め; Challenge) (2011)
- "C'mon, Let's Go" (2011)
- "Kila Kila" (2011)
- "Tan-Kyu-Shin" (2011)
- "Strong" (Miyavi vs Kreva) (2011)
- "Hot Summer Days" (2011)
- Hikari (ひかり; Light) (2012)
- "Oh Yeah!" (2012)
- "Na Na Na" (2012)
- Ouja no Kyuujitsu (王者の休日; Champion Holidays) (2013)
- Tranquilizer (トランキライザー) (2014)
- "Under The Moon" (2015)
- Neiro (音色; Melody) ~2019 Ver.~ (2019)
- "One" feat. JQ from Nulbarich (2019)
- Jinsei (人生; Life) (2019)
- Tanpopo (タンポポ; Dandelion) feat. ZORN (2020)
- "Fall in Love Again" feat. Daichi Miura (2020)
- Kaerareru noha Mirai dake (変えられるのは未来だけ; Only The Future Can Be Changed) (2021)
- Rassera (ラッセーラ) (2023)
- "Expert" (2023)
- "Forever Student" (2024)
- "No Limit" (2025)

=== DVDs ===
- Kreva Tour 2006 Ai Jibunhaku - Kokuminteki Gyōji - Nippon Budōkan (KREVA TOUR 2006 愛・自分博 ~国民的行事~ 日本武道館) (2006)
- Kreva Concert Tour '07 Imishin (KREVA CONCERT TOUR '07 意味深) (2007)
- Kreva Concert Tour '07 K-ing: Nippon Budōkan 2 Days (KREVA CONCERT TOUR '07 K-ing~日本武道館2DAYS) (2008)
- Chart Busters K! (チャートバスターズK!) (2008)
- MTV Unplugged Kreva (2008)
- Kreva Concert Tour '09 Imishin 2 (KREVA CONCERT TOUR '09 意味深2) (2009)
- Kreva Concert Tour '09-10' "Shinzō" Round 3: Yokohama Arena (KREVA CONCERT TOUR "09-10" ｢心臓｣ ROUND3 横浜ｱﾘｰﾅ) (2010)
- Kreva Concert Tour 2011-2012 "Go" Tokyo International Forum (KREVA CONCERT TOUR 2011-2012「GO」東京国際フォーラム) (2012)
- 908 Festival (2013)
- "908 Festival" 2014 at Nippon Budōkan (「908 FESTIVAL」2014 at 日本武道館) (2015)
- Kreva Concert Tour 2017 "Total 908" (2017)
- Kanzen Hitori Tour 2018 at Zepp Tokyo (完全1人ツアー2018 at Zepp Tokyo) (2019)
- 15th Anniversary Year Kreva "New Best Album Live - Seichou no Kiroku - at Nippon Budōkan" (15TH ANNIVERSARY YEAR KREVA「NEW BEST ALBUM LIVE – 成長の記録 – at 日本武道館」) (2020)
- Technics presents "Connect" Online Live at SHIBUYA (2023)
- Kreva Concert Tour 2023 "No Reason" at Nippon Budōkan (KREVA CONCERT TOUR 2023「NO REASON」at 日本武道館) (2023)

== Filmography ==
- 461 Days of Bento: A Promise Between Father and Son (2020)

== Awards and nominations ==
Year	Nominee / work	Award	Result
2003	(with Kick The Can Crew)	MTV Video Music Awards Japan: Best Live Performance	Won
2004	Saga Continue (with Kick The Can Crew)	MTV Video Music Awards Japan: Best Group Video	Won
2004	(with Kick The Can Crew)	MTV Video Music Awards Japan: Best Website	Won
2005	I'm Not Alone	MTV Video Music Awards Japan: Best Male Video	Nominated
2005	Funky Glamorous	MTV Video Music Awards Japan: Best Hip Hop Video	Nominated
2006	Issai Gassai	MTV Video Music Awards Japan: Best Hip Hop Video	Nominated
2007	The Show	MTV Video Music Awards Japan: Best Hip Hop Video	Won
2007	The Show	MTV Video Music Awards Japan: Best Male Video	Nominated
2008	Strong Style	MTV Video Music Awards Japan: Best Hip Hop Video	Nominated
2008	Magic	MTV Video Music Awards Japan: Best Collaboration Video	Nominated
2009	A-ka-sa-ta-na-ha-ma-ya-ra-wa-o-n (あかさたなはまやらわをん)	MTV Video Music Awards Japan: Best Male Video	Won
2009	A-ka-sa-ta-na-ha-ma-ya-ra-wa-o-n (あかさたなはまやらわをん)	MTV Video Music Awards Japan: Best Hip Hop Video	Nominated
2010	Speechless	MTV Video Music Awards Japan: Best Male Video	Nominated
2010	Speechless	MTV Video Music Awards Japan: Best Hip Hop Video	Won
2012	Basics (基準)	MTV Video Music Awards Japan: Best Hip Hop Video	Won
