= List of Tales of the Abyss episodes =

Cover of the first DVD released of the series.

The 26 episodes of the Japanese anime series Tales of the Abyss are jointly produced by Bandai Visual, Namco Bandai Games, and Sunrise, and are based on the PlayStation 2 game of the same name. Taking place in a fantasy world, the story focuses on Luke fon Fabre, a young swordsman whose pampered life turns upside down when he unwittingly becomes the target of a military-religious organization known as the Order of Lorelei, who believe him to be the key to an ancient prophecy. Together with his companions, Luke attempts to discover the truth and significance of his own birth, as well as unravel the mystery of The Score, the prophecy that has bound humanity's actions for thousands of years.

The episodes were directed by Kenji Kodama and written by Akemi Omode. The first episode premiered in Japan on Tokyo MX on October 3, 2008. The episodes also aired on Animax, MBS, BS11, and CBC. The episodes were collected in DVD, Blu-ray and UMD format. The first volume was released on February 20, 2009, while the ninth and final volume was released on October 29, 2009.

On July 22, 2010, Anime News Network announced that the North American anime distributor Bandai Entertainment acquired the license to the Tales of the Abyss anime. Originally set to release on July 7, 2011, it was later delayed to October 11, 2011. Following the closure of Bandai Entertainment in 2012, Sunrise announced at their panel at Otakon 2013, that Funimation has rescued the series, along with a handful of other former Bandai Entertainment titles.

Two pieces of theme music were used for the episodes, one opening theme and one ending theme. The opening theme, "Karma" by Bump of Chicken, is the theme song of the source game. The ending theme is Bōken Suisei by Kurumi Enomoto.

== Episode list ==
No.	Title	Original release date
1	"World of the Score"; Transliteration: "Sukoa no Sekai" (Japanese: 預言の世界)	October 3, 2008
Luke fon Fabre is the son of the Duke of the Kimlasca Kingdom. He is pampered and confined within the walls of the palace as he was abducted by his foes for a year seven years prior. However, he escapes from the palace and his caretaker, and friend, Guy comes in his search to inform him that his fiance has come to visit him. Before his teacher, Master Van, leaves to search for Fon Master Ion, they have one last session. While dueling, a mysterious woman attacks them. Luke defends Van and inexplicably teleports with the woman half way across the world. The woman introduces herself as Tear Grants. She and Luke get a ride to the capital.
2	"Sacred Beast Woods"; Transliteration: "Seijū no Mori" (Japanese: 聖獣の森)	October 5, 2008
Luke and Tear find out that they are in Malkuth. They go to Engeve, and Luke is blamed for the recent food robberies. After being taken to the mayor, Rose, they meet Ion, the Fon Master of the Order of Lorelei who is supposed to be missing, and Anise. Luke and Tear go to the Cheagle Woods to confront the cheagles. They meet Ion again at the entrance, and he accompanies them. When confronting the cheagles, they learn that a cheagle accidentally set fire to the ligers' home. They stole the food from the village as an offering to get their comrades back, who were taken to be eaten. Fon Master Ion, Luke, and Tear decide to talk to the Liger Queen. Mieu, the cheagle who set fire to the liger's home, goes with them and acts as a translator. After defeating the queen with help from Jade, a Colonel in the Malkuth military, Mieu is exiled from the Cheagle Woods and must serve Luke for a full cycle of the seasons. Luke and Tear are then arrested by the Malkuth military.
3	"Oracle Knights Attack"; Transliteration: "Orakuru Raishū" (Japanese: 神託の盾来襲)	October 12, 2008
Luke reveals himself to be the son of the duke of Kimlasca and is then asked to deliver a peace treaty to the king of Kimlasca. On their way to Kimlasca however, the Tartarus is attacked by a large number of Griffins and Ligers. They were attacked by Largo the Black Lion and Jade ends up getting hit by a fon slot seal. Anise were to take Fon Master Ion and escape, while Jade manage to defeat Largo after getting hit by the fon slot seal. Ion and Anise were to flee but Ion was captured by the Oracle knights and Anise was seen thrown off the Tartarus. Luke, Tear and Jade are then locked up in the ambush on the bridge but they were able to shut down the Tartarus. Their next move is to retrieve Ion, which was successful due to the appearance of Guy, a servant in Fabre's manor. Guy's phobia for women is first shown here. The party is attacked by Oracle Knights and Luke refuses to kill any soldiers which result in wounding Tear, who was trying to protect him.
4	"The Hidden Truth"; Transliteration: "Kakusareta Shinjitsu" (Japanese: 隠された真実)	October 19, 2008
Tear awakens after the attack, and heals herself. The party learns that Anise has already moved to the second location which is Kaitzur. Luke learns that Van is also at Kaitzur and is determined to head there immediately. The party meets up with Anise who is seen trying to enter Kaitzur but it seems she had lost her passport. Van enters and Tear readies her weapon causing a scene. Ion explains what happen so far to Van, Tear seems untrusting of her brother. It is revealed that Tear is assigned by Mohs to search for the Seventh Fonstone. Arietta kidnaps the engineer at the Kaitzur Port and tells everyone to bring Luke and Ion to Coral Castle. Two young men beg Ion to rescue the engineer, and Ion agrees. Guy has another reaction when Anise hugs him from behind, while entering the Castle. Luke is then kidnapped not long after that, and everybody is attacked by Arietta the Wild and her monster friends, in which the party finds out that the Liger Queen they had killed was her mother. Dist and Sync did something to Luke while everybody takes on Arietta and Guy manages to go find Luke first. Guy then attacks Sync, who fled the scene right after that, and gives a fon disc dropped by Sync to Jade, who appeared shocked looking at the Fon machinery Luke was found in. The party then departs from Kaitzur and head to Baticul.
5	"Chosen Hero"; Transliteration: "Erabareshi Eiyū" (Japanese: 選ばれし英雄)	October 26, 2008
Jade discusses with everybody what's on the Fon Disc. He explains that the Fon Disc contains information about Lorelei, the aggregate sentience of the Seventh Fonon whose existence is hypothetical. Luke still does not comprehend the information given in which Tear learns that Luke had to recall everything he had lost such as remembering his parents' faces and words. The ship was then attacked by an unknown fontech signature, and the party rushes outside to see the problem, only to be greeted by Dist the Reaper, one of the God-Generals, in which Jade calls him Dist the "Runny". Dist demands the return of the Fon Disc that was taken from Choral Castle. He successfully snatch the disc from Jade only to find out that Jade has already memorized the contents within the disc, enraging him even further. Kaizer Dist R was summoned and was soon damaged by Splash, cast by Jade. Van shows up and destroys the Fontech, knocking Dist into the ocean. Jade commented on the fact that Dist has the tenacity of a cockroach. Luke releases hyperresonance later in the evening, scaring him. Van tells him to calm down and tells him that the reason why he was holed up in his manor because the King wanted to use him as a weapon of Kimlasca. The party enters Baticul and was greeted by Commander Goldberg and Brigadier General Cecille. They are taken to the castle of Baticul where they interrupt a meeting between the King and Grand Maestro Mohs. The letter from Emperor Peony the Ninth was delivered and King Ingobert considers the letter. The party head to the manor where Luke lives only to be greeted by Princess Natalia, his fiancee. He finds out that his mother had fallen ill and visits her along with Tear who apologizes for being the cause of Luke's disappearance. Luke is asked to be the good-willed ambassador of Kimlasca and head to Akzeriuth, since Malkuth asks for the aid of Kimlasca along with the peace treaty. Luke accepts the offer. Kimlasca sends Guy, the Order of Lorelei sends Tear and Van, and Jade is to accompany them as well. Van talks to Luke later in the afternoon and tells Luke that he will cause war if he were to move people out of Akzeriuth. Luke then learns that it was Van, not Malkuth, who kidnapped Luke in the past now he asks Luke to run away with him to Daath. Natalia is seen eavesdropping on the two of them.
6	"Desert Rain"; Transliteration: "Sabaku no Ame" (Japanese: 砂漠の雨)	November 2, 2008
The Dark Wings capture Fon Master Ion and brought him before Asch the Bloody, who bears a striking resemblance to Luke. Meanwhile, Luke and the others make preparations to leave for Akzeriuth. Van embarks on a decoy ship while Luke and the others make their way to Chesedonia by land. Learning that the God-Generals are guarding the exit to the city, Luke and the others made their way through an underground passage, where Princess Natalia joins them on their quest. Asch brings Ion to the other God-Generals aboard the Tartarus, where Luke and the others confront Asch. Luke is shocked by the fact that Asch looks exactly like him; Asch and the God-Generals make their escape. Using a telepathic link which Asch tells Luke he should understand, Asch instructs Luke and the others to follow them to the Zao ruins.
7	"Isolation"; Transliteration: "Koritsu" (Japanese: 孤立)	November 9, 2008
Luke and the others arrive at the Zao Ruins. Asch uses Ion to open the Daathic Seal deep within the ruins, but Luke and the others arrive before they can proceed in. Sync and Largo appear to prevent Luke and the others from interfering, and engages in battle with the party. Asch joins in the fray, engaging Luke in one-on-one sword fight; however, their moves mirror's each other. When a final clash of their blades generates a hyperresonance that threatens to collapse the ruins, everyone flees the ruins. Later, as Luke and the others prepare to board their ship, Guy falls to the ground, clutching a strange glyph on his arm, which Ion reveals to be a curse slot placed on him by Sync. As Luke and the others proceed further on their way, they are confronted by Legretta, who scorns them for following the Score without question before leaving. As the rest of the group walks onward, Luke has a childish outburst, and Tear coldly tells him to think for himself, warning him that if he does not, he will make a mistake that he can not take back.
8	"Collapse"; Transliteration: "Hōraku" (Japanese: 崩落)	November 16, 2008
Luke and the others arrive at Akzeriuth after hearing the score about Luke's destiny. Everyone except Luke did what they can to neutralize the miasma around the area. Going into tunnel 14, Luke and Ion encounters Van who leads them to a Sephiroth. At that time, Van tells Luke to release a hyperreasonance with the words "Foolish Replica Luke". Luke opens all of his fon slots, causing the destruction of the passage ring and causing Akzeriuth to begin to collapse into the earth. Tear informs Jade that Van is trying to destroy Akzeriuth and Asch arrives at the scene too late. Tear accuses Van that he betrayed them all and Van addressing Tear as Mystearica, telling her about the folly of the world and to use the fonic hymns. Tear saves Luke and the others, but fails to protect Akzeriuth, and they fall to the Qlipoth. They went into the Tartarus, which is operational enough to go through the mud and miasma. Tear then informs the group about the world they live in is called the Outer world. However, the Sephiroth that supports Akzeriuth was destroyed by Luke, who is in denial about his part in this. Everyone becomes fed up with Luke's inability to take responsibility and leaves him except for Mieu, who understands his pain. They arrive at Yulia City and Luke refuses to go inside the Mayor's office because he doesn't want to keep being accused of things. He is confronted by Asch, who tells Luke that he is a replica of Asch, causing Luke to lose all control and attack him, only to easily defeat him.
9	"The Usurped One"; Transliteration: "Ubawareshimono" (Japanese: 奪われし者)	November 23, 2008
Luke awakens to find himself in Asch's body; he learned that perfect isofons can communicate with each other, and that Dist and Sync opened his fon slots at Choral Castle. Asch enters the meeting room in which everybody agrees to assist him except Tear, who will stay in Yulia City. The Tartarus returns to the Outer Lands via the memory particles that caused the Sephiroth to appear where Akzeriuth had once been. The party head to Belkend where Van visits often to gather information. They went in an office where they learned that the traitor to Kimlasca, Spinoza, is still working in Belkend. Jade is then revealed to be Dr Balfour, the Father of Fomicry. Spinoza escapes but not before mentioning Van's preservation project and left an information leading to Ortion Cave. Guy leaves the party for Luke at Aramis Spring. Asch dreams of his past seven years ago when he was kidnapped and when Luke was born. Reaching the end of the cavern, they found out that fonimin that is mined out of the cavern covers at least a tenth of Auldrant. Data of the residents of Hod, which should have been removed by the Malkuth military, is also found. An earthquake happens and Asch tells the party that the earthquake was caused by the beginning of the falling of the Southern Runica Plains. Luke is sent back to his own body and confronts Tear about the destruction of Akeriuth. She responds by telling Luke that he always shifts the blame to others and that he is unable to take responsibility for himself. Luke finally stops denying her words and acknowledges his own shortcomings, and makes a resolve to change and as proof of that he cuts his hair.
10	"Return of Atonement"; Transliteration: "Tsugunai no Kikan" (Japanese: 償いの帰還)	November 30, 2008
Luke and Tear go to see Mayor Teodoro and Luke introduces himself as the one who destroyed Akzeriuth. Teodoro recognizes Luke as the replica and informs them that the destruction of Akzeriuth was written in the Closed Score only known to Maestro class or above. Tear informs Teodoro that Van is trying to destroy the Outer Lands, but Teodoro says Van is doing a great job as a watcher. Luke then realizes that Teodoro wouldn't listen to them and decides to return to the Outer Lands. They arrived at Aramis Spring and encountered Guy who was waiting for Luke. They left the spring and met Jade, who gave Luke a harsh greeting. Jade informs Luke and the others that Ion and Natalia have been captured by the Oracle knights; they head to Daath where they find Anise. They infiltrate the Oracle headquarters and rescued Ion and Natalia and escaped.
11	"City of Falling Snow"; Transliteration: "Yuki Furu Machi" (Japanese: 雪降る街)	December 7, 2008
The Tartarus has a partial engine failure and must stop in a nearby port, Keterburg Bay, for repairs. Upon arriving in town, it is revealed that Jade, Dist, and Emperor Peony of Malkuth were all raised in this same city. Jade meets with his sister, Nephry, the governor of the city, and made arrangements for the ship to be repaired. While they are stranded in the city, Jade speaks of his past to Luke and reveals that he and Dist, formerly called Saphir, had experimented with replication and fonic artes. One day, Jade unleashed a fonic arte that he was unable to control; which, resulted in the death of his instructor, Professor Nebilim. This sparked his research into fomicry, as he attempted to create a replica of Nebilim, but was unsuccessful. He was then adopted into a military family and through his military career gathered data from corpses on the battlefield to fuel his research, earning him the title of "the Necromancer." The ship is soon repaired, and Luke and the others set sail for Grand Chokmah.
12	"Water Metropolis"; Transliteration: "Mizu no Toshi" (Japanese: 水の都)	December 14, 2008
Luke and the others arrive in Grand Chokmah, where they are denied entry due to a security lock down. Jade, as a colonel of the Malkuth military, is allowed entrance, and the others are forced to wait outside where they are attacked by Largo. Guy's curse slot is then activated by Sync causing him to attack Luke. The Malkuth military intervenes; hence, prompting Largo and Sync to retreat. Ion reveals that the curse slot can only work if the person possessed a strong desire to kill their target, which makes Luke wonder how he had wronged Guy in the past. He asks Guy about this, and Guy reveals that he was initially from the Island of Hod, and Luke's father led the attack which destroyed the city. Luke and the others then meet with Emperor Peony, and Kimlasca officially declares war upon Malkuth. Desperate to stop the war, Luke and the others volunteer to go to St. Binah and rescue the citizens before the city sinks into the Qliphoth. Although Luke and the others manage to rescue the majority of the citizens, many are still on a portion of the land as it begins to sink. As Luke bemoans his inability to save them, an airship arrives to assist in the rescue.
13	"Outbreak of War"; Transliteration: "Kaisen" (Japanese: 開戦)	December 21, 2008
Returning from their rescue mission, the group sees that war has broken out between Malkuth and Kimlasca. Wanting to halt the war, they split into two groups to approach the rulers of the two kingdoms, with Jade, Anise and Ion going to seem Emperor Peony in Malkuth. Luke, Natalia, Tear, Guy, and Mieu go to Kimlasca, but when they arrive at Baticul, Grand Maestro Mohs declares that Natalia is not the true princess. The real daughter of the king and queen died in childbirth, but to avoid grieving the queen, her attendant replaced the dead baby with her daughter's recently born child, Merly. Denouncing Natalia as a traitor to the kingdom for being a false princess and Luke for his role in the destruction of Akzeriuth, the group is led away, with Guy and Tear put in the dungeon and Natalia and Luke put in a private room. They are brought poison to drink to end their shame in a "dignified" fashion, but Luke destroys the glasses. Asch frees Tear and Guy who rescue Luke and Natalia from the room.
14	"Sealed Past"; Transliteration: "Tozasareta Kako" (Japanese: 閉ざされた過去)	December 28, 2008
Natalia, Luke, Tear, and Guy flee Baticul and reunite with Jade and the others. They travel to Belken to try to find a way stop the fallen lands from sinking into the Qliphoth. There, they learn that the liquefaction is being caused by vibrations from Auldrant's core, caused by the use of the "Planet Storm" energy distribution system. As the system cannot be shut down without rendering fonic arts and fon machines useless, they find a text that describes a way to stop the vibrations. While in Belkend, Guy meets with Van, revealing that Guy was once Van's master. He asks Van to stop with his plan, but Van refuses and Guy dismisses him as his servant. Leaving the Belkend researchers to work on the machine, they take a measuring device and travel to the cathedral in Daath to find another a standing Sephiroth tree that they can go to measure. They meet Anise's mother, but are attacked by Arietta and her two ligers. During the battle, Ion runs over to protect a child from one of the liger's blasts, but Anise's mother takes the blast instead to protect him. She's only mildly wounded, but the battle causes Guy to remember his family's death, revealing the reason behind his fear of women: he was protected from the attacking soldiers by his dying sister and maids covering his body with their own. Ion reads the closed scored, revealing that the replica Luke was not part of the original score, and that they can find a tree in Tataroo Valley. As they travel to the core, Anise chases a rare butterfly and nearly falls off a cliff, but Guy saves her only realizing after the fact that he had touched a female. When the group reaches the Sephiroth tree, they find the passage ring has stopped. Tear walks around the path circling the tree and it suddenly restarts. As Guy gets the measurements, Luke checks on Tear who is on kneeling on the ground seemingly in pain.
15	"Their Decisions"; Transliteration: "Sorezore no Ketsui" (Japanese: それぞれの決意)	January 9, 2009
The group returns to Belkend with the measurements. Class I's Iemon and his partner Aston reveal that from the measurements it seems Sephiroth trees have all weakened and all of the land will fall into the Qliphoth. Jade asks the researches to build a device to stop the vibrations, and says they will use the Tartarus to drop it into the core so the lands can safely descend into the miasma without danger. Luke feels they should speak with King Ingobert and Emperor Peony, believing the two countries should work together. Natalia is still scared to return to Baticul, so the others wait until she is ready. That night, Luke sees her go out alone to the coast where Asch surprises her. Asch repeats the promise they made long ago, that when they grow up, they would work together to change the country forever. This gives Natalia courage to face her father. Tear notices Luke eavesdropping, and he expresses regret over being born and tearing Asch and Natalia apart, but Tear reminds him that without his being born, Asch would have died in Azkeriuth and that he has his own life to live. In the morning, the group go to Baticul where Ion uses his authority to gain everyone's entry. Luke and Natalia begs Ingobert to stop the war and let them safely lower the outer lands. Despite Mohs' interference, Natalia love for her country and her father reach Ingobert and he finally admits that regardless of birth, Natalia is still his daughter. He agrees to the peace treaty with Malkuth and the plan to lower the lands. The peace treaties are signed in Yulia City. However, Guy then interrupts and questions Ingobert if he will keep his word now when he did not keep his word regarding Hod. There Peony reveals that Kimlasca did not destroy Hod, but Malkuth did as it was being used for fonic experiments. Van, a test subject at the time, created a hyperresonance destroying the city at the age of 11 to avoid Kimlasca to revealing their research.
16	"The Core Entry Operation"; Transliteration: "Chikaku Totsunyū Sakusen" (Japanese: 地核突入作戦)	January 16, 2009
The device to neutralize the core vibration is installed on the Tartarus, and the Albiore is loaded onto the ship as well so the group will be able to escape the core before being crushed by the pressure. As they prepare to leave, Major Legretta arrives and the Oracle Knights have taken over the port. The builders help them escape; Iemon and Tamara are killed by Legretta for their actions. At the port, the rest of the builders put the Oracle Knights to sleep to save the Tartarus. Van arrives, with Spinoza who was the one who told them about the plan. Van reveals that he knows humanity will die and that it was his plan all along, as he feels they are nothing but puppets living by the store. He will clear the entire world and recreate it all from "nothingness" using replicas. Jade and Tear argue that it's impossible as replicas can't be maintained for long and that there are not enough Seventh Fonons, but Van says destroying Lorelei will fix that problem. Legretta and the rest arrive. The group runs away as Aston, Cathy, and Henken, the remaining builders, throw themselves in front of Van and are killed (except Aston who is knocked side). On the Tartarus, the others mourn the deaths of the builders. Luke is angry that Tear says it isn't the time to cry, but Guy points out that her eyes were welling up after she leaves. After the group enters the core, they set up the device. As they flee to the Albiore, they are confronted by Sync, who had used the distraction provided by Van and Legretta to get on board. During the battle, Luke breaks his mask, revealing that Sync has the same face as Ion. Ion then reveals that both he and Sync are replicas of the original Fon Master Ion. Ion is the seventh replica, having been created two years ago. The original Ion was ill and dying, but since there was no successor, Van and Mohs made replicas. The ones with the closest abilities were kept, while ones like Sync were considered trash and thrown into the mouth of Mt. Zaleho, an active volcano. Sync was kept alive to be used by Van. Ion tries to convince him that his life has more meaning than that, but Sync, saying his usefulness is now at an end, throws himself from the ship and into the core. Ion cries soundlessly and without realizing he is. Ion says it's the first time he has ever cried or felt sadness. As the group again heads to the Albiore before time runs out, Luke is besieged by a voice again and collapses in pain. Tear tries to heal him, and the voice, calling her a descendant of Yulia, borrows her body. It reveals that it is Lorelei and that Luke is one of his perfect isofons. He tells him that something is draining his power and that he is trapped, requesting Lukes help. Tear collapses and the voice fades. The group escapes from the core in the Albiore just in time, but Tear remains unconscious and Natalia's healing powers have no effect. They take her Belkend for treatment. The doctor says her body has absorbed seventh fonons contaminated by the miasma, with Jade deducts happens each time Tear interacted with the Passage Rings during the actions to lower the lands. The doctor warns if she continues doing so, she'll die.
17	"Overture to Collapse"; Transliteration: "Hōrai no Jokyoku" (Japanese: 崩壊の序曲)	January 23, 2009
The group reluctantly agrees that they must take Tear with them to lower the lands, as she is the only one who can activate the passage rings. Spinoza approaches them, expressing his regret that his desire to do his own research resulted in the deaths of his friends. Anise doesn't want to believe him and doesn't understand why Luke and the others agree to trust him. Jade asks Spinoza to help them with the mission. Luke visits Tear and she acts like she is fine with dying. He yells at her for not being honest, then refuses to leave as she begins shaking only agreeing to turn around so he doesn't "see" her. In the morning the group goes to the Meggiora Highlands, where Tear activates the passage ring and nearly collapses again. She insists on continuing and they go on to the desert ruins where she faints after activating its passage ring. By the end of the day, they have only one Sephiroth left to activate and Spinoza has confirmed that they can seal the miasma. At camp that night, they realize Van must have somehow found and read the Seventh Fonstone. Guy remembers Van taking him to a "secret place" in Hod as a child and realizes now that it contains something that may be the fonstone. That night, Van approaches Tear and asks her to stop activating the passage rings, revealing that his body is also being affected. He again asks her to join him, but reflecting on her friends, she refuses. Asch interrupts and attacks Van. The others arrive just as Asch is badly wounded by Van. Van asks why he wants to save a world that left him despair. While he hates the world and wants the score destroyed, Asch says he has something precious he wants to protect, which Natalia realizes is her. Van tells him still needs him, not Luke, then turns again to Tear. Tear tells him to kill her and make a replica, since all he wants is a world of them. Van retreats and tells Asch to meet him at the Absorption Gate. Asch runs after him, refusing to allow Natalia to heal his wound. At the camp, Tear resolves to fight her brother to the end. In the morning, they go to Mount Roneal where the last passage ring is located, traveling through Keterberg as they can't land the Albiore in the avalanche ridden area. While in Keterberg, they find Dist throwing a tantrum about being left behind. Jade turns him over to the military police after taking him into an alley and making him talk through unknown means. As the group continues, Ion and Luke discuss being replicas and Ion admits that he once felt like Sync, that he was nothing but a replacement that could die without regard. Luke isn't sure what he wants, but Ion tells him he will discover the answer after he is free from Van. Legretta, Arietta, and Largo attack. Realizing they are running out of time, Jade uses his fonic arts to cause an avalanche. The group gathers around Tear who creates a shield to protect them, while the soldiers and the God-Generals are pushed off a cliff. Afterwards they find themselves at the door to the passage ring. After the last ring is activated, something goes wrong and Jade realizes that the ring held a trap to cause the ring's activation to reverse the particle flow and accelerate the land collapse.
18	"Absorption Gate"; Transliteration: "Abusōbu Gēto" (Japanese: アブソーブゲート)	January 30, 2009
The group rest for the night in Keterberg as a snow storm has the Albiore grounded. Luke apologizes to Natalia for not knowing the words of Asch's promise to her. Natalia asks him to make the promise now, which he does. Afterwards she promises not to doubt him or who he is anymore, her dear childhood friend. Luke hesitates to go to Tears room, unsure of what to say to her, and instead talks with Guy about their conflicting feelings about having to fight Van. In the morning, Luke feels something calling him and goes out to find Asch. Luke asks him to join them, but he refuses due to his injury and makes Luke promise to kill Van. At the Absorption Gate, and earthquake breaks the path under their feet. Luke and Tear fall, waking up on a lower level. As they search for the others, Tear tells Luke about Van's raising of her and his being used to destroy Hod. When they reach the ring, they find Van playing an organ and confront him. Van demands to know why Luke is there instead of Asch, and Luke asks why he was made. Van tells him he was born to be a disposable pawn to mess up the score, but it didn't work and then he says the score is continuing on to its major events despite the disruption. As Van refuses to listen to them, Luke and Tear begin battling him, but Luke hesitates to make a killing blow and is disarmed. As Van is about to kill him, the others arrive and attack. Luke regains his feet and slices Van across the chest, defeating him. Van, laughing at his being defeated by a "failure" throws himself backwards off the platform and into the core. Jade asks Luke to use his hyperresonance to stop the ring. Asch helps him from a distance and the ring is successfully reversed. Loreli contacts them both and tells them that he is sending them a key to set him free. Luke collapses afterwards. A month later, a bored Luke is back in Baticul with Mieu. The war has ended and the lands safely lowered into the Qliphoth. Everyone has returned to their own homelands, Guy has returned to Malkuth, and Natalia is busy fulfilling her official duties. Luke is unhappy, shutting himself in the house and mostly sleeping. His mother encourages him to go visit his friends, having arranged for Noelle to come pick him up in the Albiore. She tells him Sheridan has revived, and that Asch borrowed the Albiore III to go to Yulia City. The land is shown to appear normal, with Yulia City bathed in sunlight. Luke visits Tear where she is praying at Van's grave, hopeful that they can find a way to make a world that does not depend on the score. Asch has already left, and Luke wonders what he's investigating. Tear tells him that Van's sword is missing from the Absorption Gate, leading to wonder if one of the Six-God Generals is still alive. They set out for Daath to ask Ion.
19	"The Final Score"; Transliteration: "Saigo no Sukoa" (Japanese: 最期の預言)	February 6, 2009
In Daath, Luke and Tear are reunited with Anise, who gets them an audience with Ion. Jade and Guy are already there, and Luke asks if Asch has been by. They tell them about the Planet Storm's activity increasing, which was Van's original plan, and the missing sword. Jade and Luke reveal that Dist escaped from prison and rescued Mohs from the ship carrying him to trial. Malkuth's troops was attacked by unknown forces carrying the Kimlascan banner. General Frings was fatally wounded, but made it back to report that the troops had empty eyes as if they were dead. The group agrees they should go to speak with King Inogbert about someone framing Kimlasca. Anise attempts to discourage him from going, then runs from the room and asks them to go on without her. Outside, they run into Natalia who came to ask Ion to officially complain about Malkuth's forces attacking Kimlasca. They explain the apparent framing to her, and Jade believes they may be replicas to impersonate both kingdoms to restart the war. As they speak, Tear collapses from her worsening condition because of the miasma built up in her body. Ion says he could remove it, but that there is a problem. Before he can explain, Anise runs in and tells them miasma is everywhere then drags him from the room. Outside, Anise and Ion are gone, and they find Arietta who begs them to save Ion from Anise, explaining that Anise has taken Ion to the Sephiroth in the cathedral to read the Seventh Fonstone, which would kill Ion. The group finds them with Mohs where they learn that Anise has been spying for Mohs because he is holding her parents hostage. Mohs and Anise escape through a passageway with Ion, with Arietta managing to pass through the door before it closes. The others are confronted by a group of replicas of people they knew, including one of Guy's sister. Tear uses a fonic hymn to put them to sleep, but it causes her to get collapse again. On Anise's doll they find a letter from her apologizing and telling them how to reach the Sephiroth. They quickly travel to Mount Zaleho, where Ion is reading the score. After they dispose of Moh's troops, Luke rushes to stop Ion from reading anymore of the score. Ion continues reading the score to Luke regardless, before the fonstone shatters and Mohs escapes. When finished, Ion reveals to Luke he read the score for him as a way to help him see his own path in life. As a final act, Ion transfers the miasma out of Tear's body into his own. Before dying, Ion tells Anise he understood why she had to do what she did, calling her his "most cherished" before his fonon's dissipate and he vanishes. Back at Daath, Anise explains to Luke that her actions were because her parents were tricked by Mohs, who used their financial debts to force Anise into his slavery. Luke holds her as she cries over Ion.
20	"Forest Gravestone"; Transliteration: "Mori no Bohyō" (Japanese: 森の墓標)	February 13, 2009
Arietta challenges Anise to a battle because she blames Anise for Ion's death. In a flashback, Arietta's first meeting with Ion is shown, as well as their time together. She never knew that the real Ion had died, so she believed the replica was the same person. Anise agrees to the fight and they meet in the Cheagle woods. While Luke and the others fight Arietta's animal friends, Anise and Arietta battle. In the end, Anise wins, killing Arietta. Largo, who was acting as referee, carries Arietta's body away and swears to avenge her death.
21	"Ancient Tower"; Transliteration: "Inishie no Tō" (Japanese: 古の塔)	February 20, 2009
The miasma has reached nearly critical levels across the surface of Auldrant, and Kimlasca and Malkuth struggle to come to a solution. When they are unable to do so, however, Jade suggests that an amplified hyperresonance might be able to destroy the miasma, however, in order to affect the entire world, it would require both an amplifier such as the Sword of Lorelei and a large number of Seventh Fonons: approximately equal to those found in 10,000 living Seventh Fonists. Asch overhears this conversation and determines to use replicas as they too are composed of Seventh Fonons. The zombie-like replicas that formerly served Mohs have begun to gather at the Tower of Rem in the Qliphoth, and Asch has headed there in order to sacrifice their lives to fuel his hyperresonance. Realizing that Asch has overheard this and is likely to attempt this, Luke and the others race to the tower in pursuit and arrive moments after Asch, who has just begun his ascent up the tower.
22	"The One Who Vanishes"; Transliteration: "Kieyukusha" (Japanese: 消えゆく者)	February 27, 2009
Luke and the others race to the top of the tower to stop Asch from completing his plan of sacrificing himself with the Replicas in the tower to rid the world of Miasma. As they talk it over, Dist makes his appearance once more in another machine. The others fight, but Jade gets in the last blow with Mystic Cage and kills him. Debating continues on whether the Replicas have a place in the world or not afterward. Asch leaves it to them to decide to sacrifice themselves or not. At Kimlasca, Jade pointed out that with using Luke as the one to sacrifice the Replicas, they can save Asch, the original. Luke's friends, especially Tear, tries their best to talk him out of it, but Luke chose this for himself, despite the high chance that he won't survive it. The Replicas decide to go through with it as long as the ones that were not in the tower were to have a place in the world. Before Luke could begin, Asch tried to interfere, but Luke grabbed the Key of Lorelei and begun the transference. The Seventh Fonons began dispersing, so Asch stepped in to assist him. This little teamwork showed that Luke had the Jewel of Lorelei all along as it revealed itself while Luke's body was fading like the other replicas were. A bright light filled the world as the Miasma was completely removed from the surface. With the Jewel of Lorelei in Luke's possession, Asch leaves the group again. Jade suggests that Luke get an examination in Belkend before continuing on. Luke said he was ok, but Jade knew better and so Luke told him the truth, that he was slowly dying. Only two others heard this as they were right outside the room, Tear and Mieu.
23	"Sorrowful Parting"; Transliteration: "Kanashiki Ketsubetsu" (Japanese: 悲しき決別)	March 6, 2009
Natalia is told that her father is alive and that they know where he is. She is also told his name and that he was working with Fon Master Mohs. Her father is none other than Badaq, or as he is known as now, Largo the Black Lion. Luke and the others discovered from Spinoza that they can access Auldrant by using the jewel to absorb the seventh fonons at the absorption gate, but they also have to go to the radiation gate simultaneously. So Luke, Natalia, and Guy go to the radiation gate and Tear, Jade, and Anise go to the absorption gate. When Luke, Natalia, and Guy arrive they encounter Largo, and they fight to the death. Natalia shoots an arrow in order to prevent Largo from killing Luke and it hits Largo and he dies telling Natalia that she looks like her mother. Tear, Jade, and Anise arrive at the absorption gate and they encounter Fon Master Mohs, who brings Van back from the core in exchange for the seventh fonstone. Van tells them how he came back to life and Tear and the others prepare to fight Fon Master Mohs and Tear kills him with Holy Cross. Luke then fills the key with seventh fonons and opens the road to Eldrant.
24	"Land of Glory"; Transliteration: "Eikō no Daichi" (Japanese: 栄光の大地)	March 13, 2009
With Mohs and Largo dead and the Planet Storm stopped at last, the shield surrounding Eldrant has been brought down, but the raised city is still protected by heavy anti-aircraft artillery. While Kimlasca and Malkuth prepare for an attack, Luke and the others prepare themselves as well. Guy gives up his quest for vengeance, Natalia accepts her birth father's death, and Luke and Asch quarrel over the reason for their existence. Finally, the military forces of both countries create a diversion to draw the fire of Eldrant's anti-aircraft defenses, and as the city of Eldrant attempts to ram the Albiore, Ginji crashes the Albiore III into the side of the city, creating an opening. The party heads for the newly made entrance to Eldrant while Van awaits their arrival.
25	"Venture It All"; Transliteration: "Sonzai o Kakete" (Japanese: 存在を賭けて)	March 20, 2009
Luke and the others arrive at Eldrant and prepare for the battle against Van, but on the way, they are informed by Ginji that Asch went to fight on his own. While running into a room, the group encounters Asch who was killing Oracle Knight replicas and they fall for a trap, which Asch and Luke fall into another room. Tear and the others are left to fight Legretta and Sync. Tear and Jade fight Legretta and Anise and Guy fight Sync. They manage to defeat Legretta and Sync and look for Luke. Meanwhile Luke talks to Asch and tells him to fight Van which infuriates because Luke isn't doing anything to acknowledge himself. Asch challenges Luke calling him a replica and Luke wins and so Asch hands Luke the key of Lorelei. Asch stays behind in order to fight the Oracle Knights in the room. But Asch fights not as Asch the Bloody, but as the real Luke Fon Fabre. Luke finds the others and they go to fight Van. Asch manages to kill most of the knights but he suddenly had a pain in his chest because he was slowly dying and ends up getting stabbed from behind. Asch then kills all the replicas and dies. Luke senses Asch's death and informs them of it. Natalia becomes heartbroken, and Jade tells Natalia to get up and to know who was really suffering. Luke and the others go to fight Van for the final showdown.
26	"New World"; Transliteration: "Arata na Sekai" (Japanese: 新たな世界)	March 27, 2009
The battle with Van begins. Van utilizes the power of Lorelei and starts to defeat the heroes. Tear begins to sing the Grand Fonic Hymn. Van is defeated. Luke stays behind to use the Key. As everyone leaves, Luke promises Tear he will return. Hod begins to fall and Luke catches Asch. Two years later Tear and the others are at the Cove where the adventure begun as a memorial for Luke. In the distance, a man approaches the group and tells Tear that he came to the Cove to fulfill his promise to her. Everyone gathers around to greet the man. While the man appears to be a physical combination of both Luke and Asch, a final view of the man shows him carrying his sword in the same fashion as Luke.
