= Pop (Mao Abe album) =

Studio album by Mao Abe
- Released: January 27, 2010
- Recorded: 2009
- Genre: J-pop
- Length: 53:58
- Label: Pony Canyon

Mao Abe chronology
Free (2009)	Pop (2010)

Alternative Cover

Singles from Pop
- 1. "Tsutaetai Koto/I Wanna See You" Released: May 27, 2009; 2. "Anata no Koibito ni Naritai no Desu" Released: August 5, 2009; 3. "Itsu no Hi mo" Released: January 13, 2010

Pop (ポっぷ, Poppu) is Mao Abe's second album, released on January 27, 2010. The album was released in two versions: a regular version and a limited edition CD+DVD version.

== Recording ==
The album consists of songs Abe wrote in her second and third years of high school. There are three exceptions: "Salaryman no Uta", "Itsu no Hi mo" and "15 no Kotoba" (15の言葉, 15 Words). "15 no Kotoba" was written just after Abe's first album was released in early 2009, and "Itsu no Hi mo" in September. Abe has not written any songs since then, blaming personal stress though finding live performance easy in this time, due to its passive nature and the lack of a need to quietly concentrate.

Abe started creating the album in June 2008. Unlike her first album, she made it without a specific theme or concept in mind. Some songs Abe had made a conscious effort to leave until her second album, such as "Monroe" (モンロー) (which is influenced by the Yasutaka Nakata electro-pop sound of Perfume). Abe found they clashed with the image she created of herself for the first album, instead wanting to focus on songs that would solidify her sound.

== Promotion ==
The album was preceded by three singles. "Tsutaetai Koto/I Wanna See You", Abe's first physically released single, featured tie-ups for both A-sides: "Tsutaetai Koto" was the music variety show Hey! Hey! Hey! Music Champ's ending theme song, while "I Wanna See You" was used in Calpis Water commercials. "I Wanna See You", along with her next single "Anata no Koibito ni Naritai no Desu", were originally released in 2008 on iTunes as acoustic demos. The third single, "Itsu no Hi mo", was used as the ending theme song for the Fuji TV documentary variety talk show Ethica no Kagami: Kokoro ni Kiku TV (エチカの鏡～ココロにキクTV～, Ethica's Mirror: TV that Listens to Your Heart).

"Mada" was used as a radio single to coincide with the album's release. It reached #23 on the Billboard Japan Hot 100.

An album track, "15 no Kotoba", was used as the theme song to the film Hanbun no Tsuki ga Noboru Sora, starring Sosuke Ikematsu.

== Track listing ==
=== CD track list ===
All songs written by Mao Abe.

No.	Title	Arranger(s)	Length
1.	"Mada (未だ, Still)"	Masakazu Andō, Yūichi Komori	3:24
2.	"I Wanna See You"	Andō	3:35
3.	"Monroe (モンロー)"	Komori	3:11
4.	"Anata no Koibito ni Naritai no Desu (貴方の恋人になりたいのです, I Wanna Be Your Lover)"	Andō	5:08
5.	"Tsutaetai Koto (伝えたいこと, Thing I Wanna Tell You)"	Komori	4:12
6.	"Tsugō no Ii Onna no Uta (都合の良い女の唄, Lucky Girl Song)"	Abe	4:56
7.	"15 no Kotoba (15の言葉, 15 Words)"	Komori	4:07
8.	"Mō Hitotsu no My Baby (もうひとつのMY BABY, Another My Baby)"	Abe	5:10
9.	"Loving Darling"	Andō	3:02
10.	"Wakaru no (わかるの, I Get It)"	Andō	5:00
11.	"Poker Face (ポーカーフェイス)"	Komori	3:47
12.	"Itsu no Hi mo (いつの日も, Someday)"	Komori	5:19
13.	"Salaryman no Uta (サラリーマンの唄, Salaryman Song)"	Abe	3:02

=== DVD track list ===
No.	Title	Length
1.	"Mao Abe Works 2008-2009"
2.	"Mao Abe Live No. 0.7 Digest (2009/12/10 Shibuya Duo)"

== Singles ==
Date	Title	Peak position	Weeks	Sales
May 27, 2009	"Tsutaetai Koto/I Wanna See You"	19 (Oricon)	10	13,290
August 5, 2009	"Anata no Koibito ni Naritai no Desu"	19 (Oricon)	5	8,768
January 13, 2010	"Itsu no Hi mo"	12 (Oricon)	5	9,216

== Japan sales rankings ==
Release	Chart	Peak position	First week sales	Sales total
January 27, 2010	Oricon Daily Albums Chart	3		
January 27, 2010	Oricon Weekly Albums Chart	5	23,000	54,000
