= Free (Mao Abe album) =

Studio album by Mao Abe
- Released: January 21, 2009
- Recorded: 2008
- Genre: J-pop
- Length: 50:19
- Label: Pony Canyon

Mao Abe chronology
Free (2009)	Pop (2010)

Singles from Free
- 1. "Free" Released: December 2008 (radio single)

Free (ふりぃ, Furī) is Mao Abe's first album, released on January 21, 2009. It entered the Japanese Oricon album charts at #17, and was in the top 300 for 10 weeks. The album was released in two versions: a regular version and a CD+DVD version only on sale for a limit period of time.

The album was Abe's first physical release, as opposed to the Japanese music industry standard of releasing singles beforehand. All of the songs on this album were written by Abe during 2006-2007 while she was at high school.

When the album was in its final stages, all of the finalised data was lost. The songs had to be rebuilt by Abe and her production team from the original studio recordings.

== Promotion ==
The album was preceded by four digital download singles on iTunes between August and November 2008: all were acoustic demos of Abe songs. Two of these songs, "Hitomishiri no Uta" (人見知りの唄, Shy Song) and "My Baby", were used as album tracks, while the other two ("Anata no Koibito ni Naritai no desu" (貴方の恋人になりたいのです, I Wanna Be Your Lover)and I Wanna See You) were used as singles after the release of the album.

The lead radio single, "Free" (ふりぃ), did extremely well on airplay charts. It reached #1 on the combined physical sales/airplay-based Billboard chart Japan Hot 100. A music video, directed by Masaki Ohkita, was made for the song), which appears on the DVD of the album. The song also had three tie-ups: it was used as the music countdown show CDTV January 2009 opening theme song (though it did not chart in the CDTV top 100), the music show Mashup! Musico's January ending theme song and the Glico Pocky commercial for special air on the music video channel Space Shower.

Three other songs had tie-ups: "Want You Darling" was used as the theme song of the drama Tetsudō Musume (鉄道むすめ, Railroad Girl) (shown since October 2008), "My Baby" was used as the Ski Jam Katsuyama ski field commercial song, and "Kirei na Uta" (キレイな唄, Pretty Song) was used as the Beauteen hair colour commercial song. This tie-up came after the album's release, hence the song features as the B-side to Abe's "Tsutaetai Koto/I Wanna See You" single, released four months later.

== Track listing ==
=== CD ===
All songs written by Mao Abe.

No.	Title	Arranger(s)	Length
1.	"Free (ふりぃ)"	Yūichi Komori	3:52
2.	"Hitomishiri no Uta (Kyōkan Shite Moraetara Ureshii tte Hanashi Desu) (人見知りの唄～共感してもらえたら嬉しいって話です～, Shy Song (I'm Just Saying I'd Like Someone to Understand How I Feel))"	Skin-Headz	4:43
3.	"My Baby"	Komori	4:03
4.	"Kirei na Uta (キレイな唄, Pretty Song)"	Komori	5:21
5.	"Deadline (デッドライン)"	Mao Abe	3:02
6.	"Don't Leave Me"	Shinji Onitsuka	5:07
7.	"Kotoba (コトバ, Words)"	Komori	4:36
8.	"Want You Darling"	Masakazu Andō	4:16
9.	"17-sai no Uta (17歳の唄, 17 Years Old Song)"	Andō	5:38
10.	"Nasakenai Otoko no Uta (情けない男の唄, Pathetic Boy Song)"	Abe	8:41

=== DVD ===
No.	Title	Length
1.	"Free (ふりぃ) (music video)"	3:52

== Personnel ==
- Mao Abe - acoustic guitar (#1–3, #5, #8–10), arranger (#5, #10), songwriter
- Masakazu Andō - arranger (#8–9), producer
- Kozo Fujita - art direction, photography
- Masao Fukunaga - drums (#2–3)
- Ryoji Hachiya - recording (#10), mixing (#5, #10)
- Daichi Hamazaki - drums (#8–9)
- Tatsurō Hayashi - hair & make-up
- Mikihiko Ishibashi - recording (#6, #10)
- Hiroyuki Ishimizu - photo assistant
- Akihisa Kanbe - supervisor
- Teppei Kawasaki - bass guitar (#1–3, #8–9), electric bass guitar (#4), washboard bass (#4)
- Kengo - background vocals (#3)
- Noriyuki Kisou - recording/mixing (#1, #7)
- Kenichi Kobayashi - bass guitar (#7)
- Yūichi Komori - arrangement (#1, #3–4, #7)
- Minoru Kuriyama - release operator
- Akira Matsuo - artist planner
- Meg&aska - styling
- Tsuyoshi Miyagawa - drums (#1, #4)
- Hitomi Mori - sales promoter
- N.O.B.U!!! - background vocals (#1)
- Katsuhito Nakanishi - A&R director
- Aya Ninomiya - artist management
- Masaki Ohkita - music video director
- Shinji Onitsuka - arranger (#6), piano (#6)
- Daisuke Sato - drums (#7)
- Toshiyuki Satō - graphic design
- Yūichi Sekine - A&R producer
- Mitsuo Shimano - executive producer
- Takumi Shimizu - executive producer
- Skin-headz - arrangement (#2)
- Junko Sugawara - electric guitar (#1–3)
- Naoki Sugawara - executive producer
- Kōji Suzuki - artist management
- Yuji Suzuki - publishing promoter
- Kensuke Takeshima - coordinator
- Yoshiyuki Tanaka - acoustic guitar (#4, #7), electric guitar (#4, #7)
- Yutaka Uematsu - mastering, recording/mixing (#2–4, #8–9)
- Kenichiro Wada - electric guitar (#4, #8–9)

== Charts ==
Release	Chart	Peak position	First week sales	Sales total
January 21, 2009	Oricon Daily Albums Chart	9		
January 21, 2009	Oricon Weekly Albums Chart	17	7,700	21,300

=== Various charts ===
Chart	Peak position	First week sales
Soundscan Album Top 20	20	5,800
