= Tsutaetai Koto/I Wanna See You =

Single by Mao Abe

from the album Pop
- B-side: "'Kirei na Uta'"
- Released: May 27, 2009
- Genre: J-pop
- Length: 4:11; 3:35
- Label: Pony Canyon
- Songwriter: Mao Abe
- Producers: Yūichi Komori, Masakazu Andō

Mao Abe singles chronology
"'My Baby (AG Ver)'" (2008)	"Tsutaetai Koto/I Wanna See You" (2009)	"'Free'" (2008)
"Free" (2008)	"Tsutaetai Koto/I Wanna See You" (2009)	"Anata no Koibito ni Naritai no Desu" (2009)

Alternative cover
- Limited CD+DVD cover

Alternative cover
- "I Wanna See You (AG Ver)" digital download cover

Tsutaetai Koto/I Wanna See You (伝えたいこと, Thing I Wanna Tell You; Ai Wana Shī Yū) is a single by Mao Abe, released on May 27, 2009 as her debut single.

The single was released in two versions: a CD+DVD limited-edition version, as well as a CD Only regular version. The B-side of the single was "Kirei na Uta" (キレイな唄, Pretty Song), a song originally from Abe's Free album released four months prior, due to it being used as the Beauteen hair colour commercial song. All three songs on the single had tie-ups.

== Tsutaetai Koto ==
"Tsutaetai Koto" is an upbeat pop rock song, about a person not being able to tell someone they like them. The author talks about not being able to say things like 'I Like You,' or 'Thank You,' to the subject as they are too shy, despite spending a night together in a parking lot talking and holding hands until dawn. The author thinks of all the people who don't say anything, then decides to express her feelings in song.

The song's lyrics were written in her first year of high school, and the music later in her third year. It was the first song she wrote after entering high school, and was her attempt to encourage herself as she had not made any friends yet. Abe found it hard to record due to four years passing, but recorded it anyway since she liked the 'keep trying' message to the song. Abe wrote the lyrics at a time when she found it hard to express feelings, and hence did not have many close high school friends. The song's message is that if you like someone, it is better to tell them this instead of doing nothing about it. Abe found herself influenced by the simple-styled lyrics of Japanese rock bands Bump of Chicken and Asian Kung-Fu Generation, who she listened to often at the time.

"Tsutaetai Koto" was used as the music variety show Hey! Hey! Hey! Music Champ's June/July ending theme song.

=== Music video ===
Abe in the music video.

A music video for "Tsutaetai Koto" was shot by director Masaki Ohkita. It shows scenes of a sad-looking Abe Mao sitting down in a parking lot, as well as Abe energetically singing the song with a band. The sad version of Abe also stares off at the sea at the beach, and stands alone in an empty room, where she attempts to use the phone. Abe considers the sad one the version of herself who can't express her feelings, and the one performing the song the one who can, cheering the other on.

As of April 20, 2010 the music video for "Tsutaetai Koto" has been viewed over 722,000 times on popular video-sharing website YouTube.

== I Wanna See You ==
"I Wanna See You" is a pop rock song about the author missing the person they like, talks about how the person laughs at the funny things she says and admits she still likes him despite him being a little annoying at times. Abe wrote the song in her third year of high school, about a boy who lived in a different prefecture to her that she visited by bus. After writing the song, when she told the boy how she felt, his answer was, "But...I have a job."

The song was originally released as an acoustic demo on iTunes (it was the fourth and last of her acoustic demos to be put up, on November 12, 2008). It was later used in Calpis Water commercials featuring Umika Kawashima, from March onwards.

== Track listing ==
All songs written by Mao Abe.

=== I Wanna See You digital download ===
No.	Title	Arranger	Length
1.	"I Wanna See You (Ag Ver)"	Mao Abe	3:28

=== Physical single ===
==== CD track list ====
No.	Title	Arranger	Length
1.	"Tsutaetai Koto (伝えたいこと, Thing I Wanna Tell You)"	Yūichi Komori	4:11
2.	"I Wanna See You"	Masakazu Andō	3:35
3.	"Kirei na Uta (キレイな唄, Pretty Song)"	Yūichi Komori	5:21
4.	"Tsutaetai Koto (Inst.) (伝えたいこと, Thing I Wanna Tell You)"	Yūichi Komori	4:11
5.	"I Wanna See You (Inst.)"	Masakazu Andō	3:35
6.	"Kirei na Uta (Inst.) (キレイな唄, Pretty Song)"	Yūichi Komori	5:21
Total length:			26:19

==== DVD track list ====
No.	Title	Length
1.	"Tsutaetai Koto (Music Video) (伝えたいこと, Thing I Wanna Tell You)"
2.	"I Wanna See You (Original CM Clip)"

== Chart rankings ==
=== Oricon charts (Japan) ===
Release	Chart	Peak position	First week sales	Sales total	Chart run
May 27, 2009	Oricon Daily Singles Chart	16			
May 27, 2009	Oricon Weekly Singles Chart	19	6,833	13,290	10 weeks
May 27, 2009	Oricon Yearly Singles Chart				

=== Various charts ===
Chart	Peak position
Billboard Japan Singles Top 100	11 (Tsutaetai Koto); 39 (I Wanna See You)
RIAJ Digital Track Chart Top 100	61 (I Wanna See You)
