= Anata no Koibito ni Naritai no Desu =

Single by Mao Abe

from the album Pop
- B-side: "'Marginal Man, Aitai yo'"
- Released: August 6, 2008 (acoustic demo digital download); August 5, 2009
- Genre: J-pop
- Length: 5:06
- Label: Pony Canyon
- Songwriter: Mao Abe
- Producer: Masakazu Andō

Mao Abe singles chronology
"Anata no Koibito ni Naritai no Desu" (2008)	"'Hitomishiri no Uta (AG Ver)'" (2008)
"Tsutaetai Koto/I Wanna See You" (2009)	"Anata no Koibito ni Naritai no Desu" (2009)	"Itsu no Hi mo" (2010)

Alternative covers
- Limited CD+DVD cover

Alternative cover
- Acoustic demo digital download cover

"Anata no Koibito ni Naritai no Desu" (貴方の恋人になりたいのです; "I Want to Be Your Lover") is a song by Mao Abe. It was originally released as her unofficial debut, in the form of an acoustic demo released to iTunes on August 6, 2008. It was later released as Abe's second physical single on August 5, 2009.

The song is a first of a series of songs Abe has written with the title ending with no desu, with the second being "Watashi wa Anata ga Ii no Desu" (私は貴方がいいのです; "I Think You're Good") on the "Itsu no Hi mo" single.

== Writing ==
The song is an arpeggio song, with lyrics about unrequited love. The author wrote someone a letter about wanting to get to know them more, which they have not replied to. They want to know the answers to simple questions, like "What sort of person do you like?" or "How long do you like a girls' hair to be?" The author wants to watch summer fireworks with the person, and shamelessly admits that they want to be his lover.

Abe wrote the song at the start of her final high school year, starting from the lyrics "Baito wa nan desu ka?" "Kanojo wa imasu ka?" (「バイトはなんですか?」「彼女はいますか?」, 'What's your job?' 'Do you have a girlfriend?'). She wanted to write a simple song about wanting to be in love. The song is autobiographical, about a boy Abe liked who would not return her email.

The song was one she performed a lot at high school-era lives, and was a favourite among her early listeners.

== Recording, release ==
The song was the first song Abe posted to her MySpace, prior to her debut. The posted version was an acoustic demo recorded by Abe, which was later posted to iTunes as her first digital download single. The studio version was recorded in mid 2008, during the recording sessions for Abe's debut album Free. It was held back from the album as Abe considered it worth being an A-side song, and should be released in the summertime.

While the original recording was performed acoustically, the studio version has a band backing. Abe wanted the studio version to not have any background vocals or embellishments, to fit with the song's simplicity.

The song was mixed by Grammy award-winning mix engineer David Thoener.

== Music video ==
Abe in the music video.

The music video was shot by director Masaki Ohkita. It is a continuous shot of Abe walking through her former high school (Ōita West High School) while singing the song.

As of November 20, 2010 the music video for "Anata no Koibito ni Naritai no Desu" has been viewed over 1,533,000 times on popular video-sharing website YouTube.

== Single ==
The single was released in two versions: a limited edition CD+DVD version, as well as a standard CD only version. The DVD features the music video for "Anata no Koibito ni Naritai no Desu."

The single features two B-sides: "Marginal Man" (マージナルマン, Mājinaru Man) and "Aitai yo" (会いたいよ; "I Miss You"). "Marginal Man" is a rock song, recorded with Abe's band for her live performances instead of with a producer. It was written in her second year of high school, and is about the anger Abe felt of feeling like students were experiment subjects. She found it difficult to show her music director the song, due to the confusing changes of tempo and the song's structure. "Aitai yo" is an acoustic ballad, written in Abe's third year of high school. It is written about the same boy as "Anata no Koibito ni Naritai no Desu."

== Track listing ==
=== Digital Download ===
No.	Title	Arranger	Length
1.	"Anata no Koibito ni Naritai no Desu (AG Ver)"	Mao Abe	4:25

=== Physical single ===
==== CD track list ====
All songs written by Mao Abe.

No.	Title	Arranger	Length
1.	"Anata no Koibito ni Naritai no Desu"	Masakazu Andō	5:06
2.	"Marginal Man" (マージナルマン Mājinaru Man)	Masakazu Andō	3:03
3.	"Aitai yo" (会いたいよ "I Miss You")	Mao Abe	4:54
4.	"Anata no Koibito ni Naritai no Desu (Instrumental)"	Masakazu Andō	5:06

==== DVD track list ====
No.	Title	Length
1.	"Anata no Koibito ni Naritai no Desu (Music Video)"	5:21

== Chart rankings ==
=== Oricon charts (Japan) ===
Release	Chart	Peak position	First week sales	Sales total	Chart run
August 5, 2009	Oricon Daily Singles Chart	15			
August 5, 2009	Oricon Weekly Singles Chart	19	4,786	8,768	5 weeks
August 5, 2009	Oricon Yearly Singles Chart				

=== Various charts ===
Chart	Peak position
Billboard Japan Singles Top 100	5
RIAJ Digital Track Chart Top 100	29
