= Takamune Negishi =

Takamune Negishi 根岸孝旨
- Born: September 28, 1961 (age 63); Saitama, Japan
- Occupation(s): musician, bassist, music producer, composer
- Instrument: bass
- Years active: 1989–present
- Labels: Victor/Speedstar

Takamune Negishi (根岸孝旨, Negishi Takamune, born September 28, 1961) is a Japanese musician, bassist, producer and composer.

He is member of the group Dr. Strange Love since 1989, together with Susumu Osada. (Takashi Furuta also was member of the group).

He has performed and recorded with several artists like Kamijo, Kyoko Koizumi, Puffy, Tamio Okuda, among others.

He has also written and arranged songs for Cocco, Kyoko, Hitomi and others.

In 2006 he formed part of a special unit called Kokua for the making of the theme song of an NHK documentary program. In 2016 he reunited with the other members to celebrate the 10th anniversary of the release of the single Progress, releasing the group's 1st official album and Nationwide tour, both called also Progress
