= Rica Imai =

Japanese model, entertainer, and actress (born 1984)

- 今井 りか
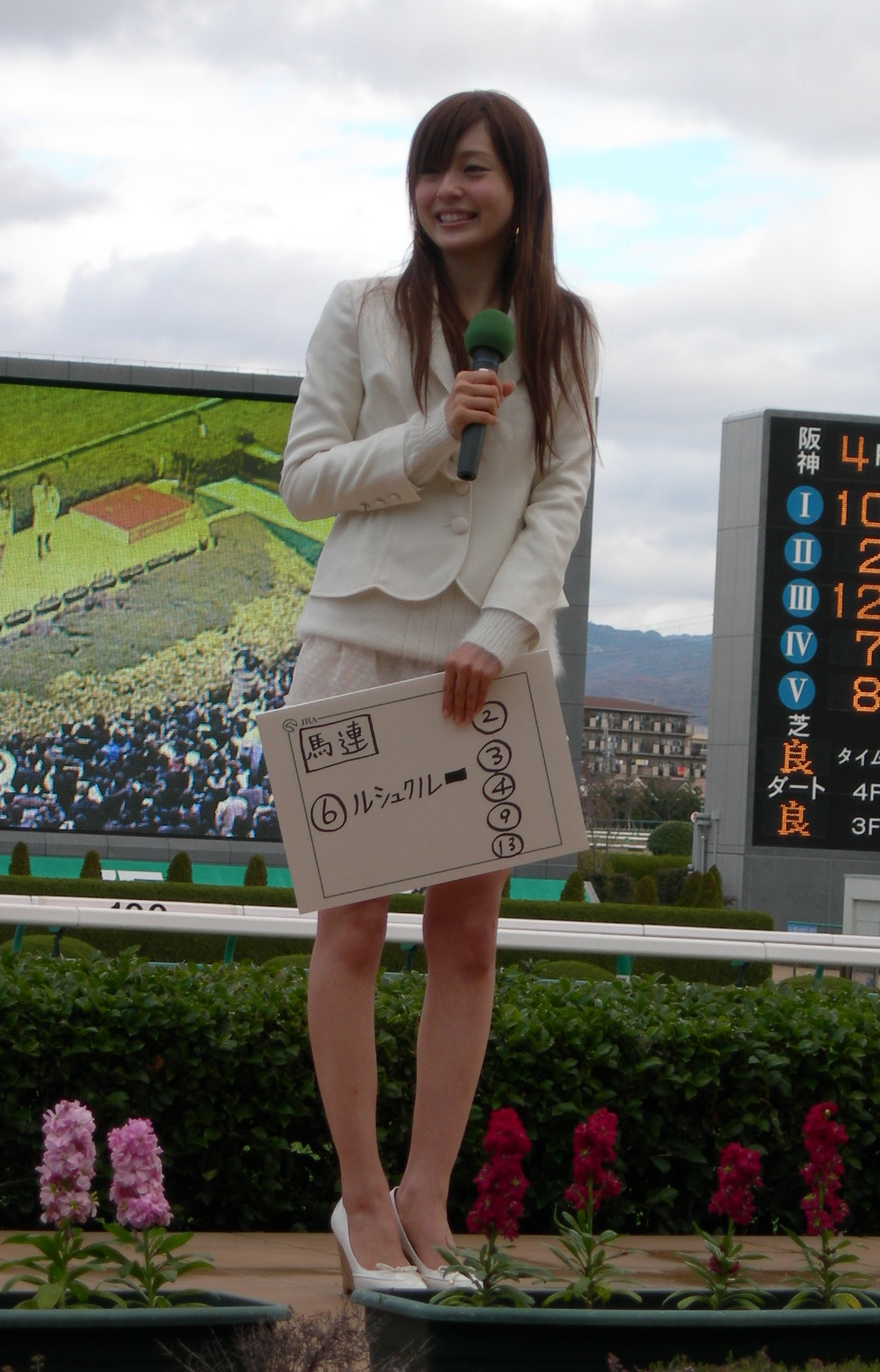
- Rica Imai in the Hanshin Racecourse talk show, December 14, 2008.
- Born: February 29, 1984 (age 42); Ageo, Saitama, Japan
- Occupations: Model; entertainer; actress
- Years active: 2002 -
- Agent: LesPros Entertainment
- Height: 1.66 m (5 ft 5 in) (2005)
- Children: 2

Rica Imai (今井 りか, Imai Rika; born February 29, 1984, in Ageo, Saitama, Japan) is a Japanese model, entertainer, and actress.

== Biography ==
After graduating from high school, Imai was listed in Vivi's "Vivi Nintei! Shin Charisma Dokusha File" Volume 7 as a reader model in February 2003. She later worked as a regular model in the fashion magazine Ray, and also worked as a "Private Level" image model. In 2007, Imai, along with Misako Yasuda and Aki Higashihara, appeared in Uma na de: Uma to Nadeshiko, started her career appearing variety series and dramas. The program also made her gain interest in horse racing. After discontinuing Uma na de on December 6, Imai's first photo-book, Rica, was released.

On March 22, 2009, she participated in the Tokyo Marathon 2009 Women's 10 km Road Race.

On September 23, 2014, after the release of Ray's November issue, Imai married a man who is three years older than her, and announced that she graduated from Ray. She later became a regular model in Lee. On October 6, 2015, Imai was reported to have given birth to her first daughter. On February 2, 2022, she gave birth to her second daughter.

== Filmography ==
=== Magazines ===
Title	Notes	Ref.
Ray	Shufunotomo	
Balia	Shueisha	
Maquia	Shueisha	
Lee	Shueisha	
Biteki	Shogakukan	
Voce	Kodansha	
InRed	Takarajimasha	

=== Shows ===
Title	Notes
Tokyo Girls Collection	

=== Horse racing ===
Year	Title	Network	Notes
2007	Uma na de: Uma to Nadeshiko	Fuji TV	
2007	Dramatic Keiba	HCB	
2007	Super Keiba	Fuji TV	
2008	Dream Keiba	Television Nishinippon	
2008	Otona no Keiba Magazine	Radio Nippon	
2009	Minna no Keiba	Fuji TV	Guest
2009	Sata Uma! Guest	KTV	
	RicaRica no Kirakira Yosō		
2010	Rica Imai no Umaraji	Radio Nippon	
2012	Uma Doki	KBS	

=== Dramas ===
Year	Title	Role	Network	Notes
2007	Hanayome to Papa	Mai Iwakura	Fuji TV	
2007	Papa to Musume no 7-kakan	Kanako Shina	TBS	
2009	Code Blue	Aya Kashiwabara	Fuji TV	
2010	Angel Bank		TV Asahi	Episode 3; Guest
2011	Propose Kyōdai: Umare-jun Betsu Otoko ga Kekkon Suru Hōhō	Rino	Fuji TV	Episode 3
2014	S: Saigo no Keikan	Aika Miyama	TBS	Episode 8

=== TV series ===
Year	Title	Network	Notes
2005	MTV Cool Christmas 2005/Short Movie	MTV Japan	
2007	Kuchikomi Johnny!	NTV	Thursday regular
2007	Mecha-Mecha Iketeru!	Fuji TV	"Yabetchi Sushi" Guest
2009	Dancing Sanma Palace	NTV	
2009	Shiru Shiru Mishiru	TV Asahi	
2009	Down Town DX	YTV	
2011	Zip!	NTV	
2012	Tokyo Precious Dating	TV Asahi	
