= Predia =

Japanese idol girl group

predia
- Also known as: pre-dia (2010–2011)
- Origin: Japan
- Genres: J-pop
- Years active: 2010–2022
- Labels: Jolly Roger; PreciouStone Music; PCI Music; Nippon Crown
- Past members: Akane Minato; Keiko Sawaguchi; Rumina Murakami; Mai Mizuno; Sakurako; Yuu Maeda; Anon; Yukiko Ishii; Sachiko Umakoshi; Yui Yosaka; Marina Murakami; Terumi Izumi; Megumi Takeda; Risa Kirikawa; Akemi Hirata; Yuzuka Hayashi; Runa Matsumoto; Reiko Aoyama; Akina Okamura
- Website: predia-party.jp

Predia (stylized as predia) was a Japanese idol girl group formed by Platinum Production in 2010.

== History ==
Predia was formed in November 2010 as a sister group to Passpo. The group officially debuted on January 26, 2011, with the release of their first single "Dia Love". They released their first album Invitation on March 28, 2012.

== Members ==
Name	Birth date	Age	Prefecture of origin
Akina Okamura (ja)	December 26, 1986	38	Yamaguchi
Akane Minato (ja)	March 20, 1990	35	Kanagawa
Reiko Aoyama (ja)	March 3, 1987	38	Hokkaido
Runa Matsumoto (ja)	January 23, 1990	35	Nara
Keiko Sawaguchi (ja)	November 29, 1991	33	Tokyo
Rumina Murakami (ja)	November 8, 1989	35	Tokyo
Mai Mizuno (ja)	August 26, 1988	36	Chiba
Sakurako (ja)	August 8, 1990	34	Chiba
Yuzuka Hayashi (ja)	January 25, 1987	38	Shiga
Yuu Maeda (ja)	April 20, 1989	36	Osaka

== Discography ==
=== Albums ===
==== Studio albums ====
Title	Details	Peak
Title	Details	JPN (Note: Sources for chart positions are as follows: Invitation, Escort Me?, Best of predia 2010-2013～Reception～, Kokō no Dahlia ni Kuchidzuke o, Byakuya no Viola ni Idakarete, Fabulous.)
Invitation (ja)	Released: March 28, 2012; Label: PreciouStone Music; Format: CD, CD+DVD	77
Kokō no Dahlia ni Kuchidzuke o (ja)	Released: February 18, 2015; Label: Crown Gold; Format: CD, CD+DVD	23
Fabulous	Released: February 16, 2018; Label: Crown Gold; Format: CD, CD+DVD	10

==== Compilation albums ====
Title	Details	Peak
Title	Details	JPN
Best of Predia 2010–2013 (Reception) (ja)	Released: April 9, 2014; Label: PCI Music; Format: CD, CD+DVD	—
Diamond	Released: May 25, 2022; Label: Nippon Crown; Format: 2×CD	11

=== Extended plays ===
Title	Details	Peak
Title	Details	JPN
Escort me? (ja)	Released: December 12, 2012; Label: PreciouStone Music; Format: CD, CD+DVD	167
Byakuya no Viola ni Idakarete (ja)	Released: February 18, 2015; Label: Nippon Crown; Format: CD, CD+DVD	16

=== Singles ===
Title	Year	Peaks		Album
Title	Year	JPN (Note: Sources for chart positions are as follows: "Dia Love", "Dream of Love", "Honey B", "Crazy Cat", "Hey Now!!", "Kowareta Ai no Hate ni", "Utsukushiki Kodoku-tachi", "Mitashite Amore", "Setsuna no Yoru no Naka de", "Kindan no Masquerade", "Nouvelle Cuisine", "Ms.Frontier", "Naked".)	JPN Hot. (Note: Sources for chart positions are as follows: "Kowareta Ai no Hate ni", "Utsukushiki Kodoku-tachi", "Mitashite Amore", "Setsuna no Yoru no Naka de", "Kindan no Masquerade", "Nouvelle Cuisine", "Ms.Frontier".)	Album
"Dia Love"	2011	166	—	Invitation
"Dream of Love"	2011	114	—	Invitation
"Honey B"	2011	40	—	Invitation
"Crazy Cat"	2013	29	—	Best of predia 2010-2013 (Reception)
"Hey Now!!"	2013	24	—	Best of predia 2010-2013 (Reception)
"Kowareta Ai no Hate ni" (ja)	2014	6	11	Kokō no Dahlia ni Kuchidzuke o
"Utsukushiki Kodoku-tachi" (ja)	2014	3	5	Kokō no Dahlia ni Kuchidzuke o
"Mitashite Amore" (ja)	2015	9	23	Byakuya no Viola ni Idakarete
"Setsuna no Yoru no Naka de" (ja)	2016	9	31	Byakuya no Viola ni Idakarete
"Kindan no Masquerade" (ja)	2017	9	31	Fabulous
"Nouvelle Cuisine" (ja)	2017	10	43	Fabulous
"Ms.Frontier" (ja)	2017	11	37	Fabulous
"Naked"	2019	11	—	Non-album singles
"Sharara Niagara"	2019	5	—	Non-album singles
