= Seon-mi =

- Hangul: 선미
- RR: Seonmi
- MR: Sŏnmi

Seon-mi, also spelled Sun-mi, is a Korean given name.

People with this name include:

- Hwang Sun-mi (born 1963), South Korean writer
- Park Sun-mi (born 1972), South Korean taekwondo coach
- Song Seon-mi (born 1974), South Korean actress
- Pak Sun-mi (born 1982), South Korean volleyball player
- Park Seon-mi (born 1982), South Korean field hockey player
- Song Sun-mi (born 1990), South Korean squash player
- Sunmi (born 1992), South Korean singer
- Heo Seon-mi (born 1995), South Korean artistic gymnast

== See also ==
- Sonmi (born 1989), Zainichi Korean model
- List of Korean given names
