= Chinatsu Wakatsuki =

Japanese gravure idol

- 若槻 千夏
- Born: Chiharu Kurihara; 28 May 1984 (age 42); Yoshimi, Hiki District, Saitama, Japan
- Other names: Chī (ちぃ); Chicchi (ちっち); Chīchan (ちぃちゃん); Chinacchan (ちなっちゃん); Chinattī (チナッティー)
- Occupations: Gravure idol; variety tarento; actress
- Years active: 2001–
- Agent: WC Japan
- Style: Gravure; fashion
- Height: 160 cm (5 ft 3 in)
- Children: 2
- Awards: Hair Color Ring Award 2005 Talent Category Award; 1st Best Jerseist Female Award

Chinatsu Wakatsuki (若槻 千夏, Wakatsuki Chinatsu; born 28 May 1984) is a Japanese variety tarento and former gravure idol. Her real name was Chiharu Kurihara (栗原 千春, Kurihara Chiharu) before she got married. She is previously represented with Platinum Production.

== Filmography ==
=== TV series ===
==== Current appearances ====
Year	Title	Network	Notes	Ref.
	Down Town DX	YTV	Irregular	
2008	Jinsei ga Kawaru 1-funkan no Fukaīhanashi	NTV	Irregular	
2016	Chinatsu Wakatsuki to Namade Ittemita	AbemaTV		

==== Former appearances ====
Year	Title	Network	Notes
2003	Kandō Factory suporuto! & News	Fuji TV	Saturday reporter
2003	Chinatsu Wakatsuki Station	Enta! 371	
2003	Hideyoshi	CBC	
2003	Shimura Juku	MBS	
2004	All That's Manzai	Fuji TV	
2004	Masahiro Nakai no Black Variety	NTV	Irregular
2005	Umacchi!	Fuji TV	Main MC
2005	Meringue no Kimochi	NTV	MC
2005	Muccha Doll Hako: Otome no Inori	YTV	Irregular appearances
2005	Tsūkai! Akashiya Denshidai	MBS	Quasi-regular
2005	Super Keiba	Fuji TV	Main MC
2005	Click!	NTV	Thursday MC
2005	Nakasendō	TV Tokyo	
2005	A	NTV	
2005	Rakka Ona	NTV	Narration; voice of Ten no Koe
2006	Love-katsu	NTV	Main MC
2006	Natsumegu-dō Real Style	Fuji TV	Main MC
2006	Gravure Talk Audition	Fuji TV	Main MC

=== Radio ===
==== Former appearances ====
Year	Title	Network
2003	Chinatsu no nazonazo Nazo?	JFN
2003	Ore-tachi no Heroine	MBS Radio
2004	Young Park Enchō-sen 2-ji made Seifū Tōron	MBS Radio
2005	Young Park 80	MBS Radio
2005	Chinatsu Wakatsuki Academy	Tokyo FM
2005	Gotcha maze'! Suiyōbi	MBS Radio

=== Magazine serialisations ===
Title	Notes
B.L.T. "Wakatsuki Produce"	
King "Eco Life Ego Life"	
Josei Jishin "Chinatsu no Man Ki' Time"	Bi-weekly production

=== Dramas ===
Year	Title	Role	Network	Notes
2005	Gokusen	Maki Mizushima	NTV	Episode 5
2006	Regatta: Kimi toita Eien	Chikako Tajima	ABC	

=== Films ===
Year	Title	Role	Notes
2004	No Name	Asami	
2004	Jurei The Movie: Kuro Jurei	Noriko Maeda	Lead role
2004	Omo no Iro	Anna	Lead role
2005	Touch	Sonoko Yabe	
2006	Ghost Train	Kanae Fujita	Quasi-lead role

=== Advertising campaigns ===
Year	Title	Notes	Ref.
	Super GT	2002 image girl; with member	
	Inoki Bom-ba-ye 2003	Bom-ba-ye Girl	
	Japan Finance Corporation for Municipal Enterprises		
	Spa World "Spa Pooh", "Water Wars"		
	Noritsu "Chōsoku Digi-Camera Print"		
	Nippon Telegraph and Telephone West Corporation		
	Namco Netsu Chū Pro Yakyū 2004	Advert song	
2003	Seiko Epson "Photo Print"	Image girl	
2004	Weds	Image girl	
2004	Kygnus Sekiyu	Image girl	
	Lawson "2004-Nen Natsu no CM Character"		
	Meiji Seika "Kotsubu Choco Series", "Pucca" "Kinokonoyama to takenoko no Sato"	Advert character	
	Tsumura "Kiki yu: Shokuen Tansan Yu-"	Advert character	
	Fabrica Communications "Kuruma Erabi.com", "Bankin Tosō Fabrica", "Kuruma Kaitori Fabrica"		
	Furuhon Shijō "2006-Nen Natsu no CM Character"	Image character	
	Suntoryfoods "Boss Rainbow Mountain"	Advert character	
	Hudson Soft Momotaro Densetsu	Advert character	
	House Wellness Foods "Nama Royal Jelly 1000 Drink"	Advert character; appeared in a honey bee costume	
	The Hachijuni Bank "Wachini no kan Dai-kun Card"	Image character	
	PDC "Skin Laminate"	Image character	
2016	AbemaTV		

=== Photo albums ===
Year	Title	Code
2002	Chinatsu no Katachi	ISBN 4-9161-1578-3
2002	Chinatsu Toitsumademo	ISBN 4-8124-1019-3
2002	Hatsukoi Monogatari: Namida de Mienai	ISBN 4-8124-1018-5
2002	Chinatsu Wakatsuki Pinup Poster	ISBN 4-8982-9871-0
2002	chinatsu graphy	ISBN 4-8604-6066-9
2003	Chī! –Jitensha ni Notte–	ISBN 4-0878-0382-1
2006	Chinattī –Honolulu to Kanda no Kankei–	ISBN 4-7897-2826-9

Others

Year	Title	Code
2001	Platinum –Suashi no Shōjo-tachi–	ISBN 4-8776-3079-1
2002	Chinatsu Wakatsuki Dai Sakusen	
2005	Bijo Megane	ISBN 4-7897-2726-2
2006	Shōjo Densetsu	ISBN 4-5754-7813-X
2006	Bijo Megane 2	ISBN 4-7897-2873-0

=== Videos and DVD ===
Year	Title
2002	Katrea
2002	Chi-chan
2003	Present
2003	Chī! –Pizza o Tabetara–
2004	Chī Natsuiro Sō
2004	Se-Jo! A-Side Chinatsu Wakatsuki 1
2004	Se-Jo! A-Side Chinatsu Wakatsuki 2
2004	Wakatsuki Kaikaku
2005	Se-Jo! 2 Chinatsu Wakatsuki "Chī"
2005	Chī sana koi no monogatari
2006	2 Side Pac
2007	Chinatsu Wakatsuki DVD-Box

Others

Year	Title	Co-stars	Ref.
2003	sabra bestgirls DVD	Yoko Kumada, Yuko Ogura, Sayaka Isoyama	
2003	Party wa Koyoi dake....	Iori	
2008	Select Momo no Jin! –Momotaro Dentetsu 20 Shūnenkinen DVD–		

=== CD ===
==== As Chinatsu Wakatsuki ====
Single/album	Tie-up
"Ai no Kakera"	Se-Jo! ending theme
"Diamond –Kibounoshirushi–"	enjoy! Baseball theme song
Utagassen –Momotaro Dentetsu 20 Shūnenkinen Album–

==== As Chinachable ====
Credited under the name Chinachable with the comedy duo Untouchable.

Year	Title	Notes
2006	"Shōri no Hanabira / Haruharari"	"Shōri no Hanabira": Sgt. Frog's sixth ending theme; "Haruharari": Umacchi! and Super Keiba ending themes
	Keroro to Giroro no Chikyū (Pekopon) Shinryaku Radio	Appeared at the ending song

=== Trading cards ===
Year	Title
2007	Platinum Official Card Collection
2009	Platinum Official Card Collection
