= Michiko Koshino =

Japanese fashion designer

- Born: 1943 (age 82–83); Osaka, Japan
- Education: Bunka Fukuso Gakuin College
- Occupation: Fashion designer
- Known for: High-end stores in Japan

Michiko Koshino (小篠 美智子, Koshino Michiko), born in 1943, is a fashion designer. She has high-end stores in Japan and a restaurant in London.

Michiko Koshino was born in Osaka, Japan to Ayako Koshino, her father died fighting during the Second World War. Her two older sisters Hiroko Koshino and Junko Koshino also became designers.

== Designs ==
In 1987, Koshino began her Motorking menswear line, which was worn by David Bowie and Moby. She also created a line of women's wear, Q tee, which is influenced by urban street wear. Her clothing line later branched out to include cosmetics, underwear, eyewear, and accessories that are sold in countries such as Asia, Europe, and the United States. Yen denim, a limited variety of Japanese denim, is another collection that has been successful for Koshino. Two of her other lines are Main Collection and 100's line. Koshino's clothing has been seen on such celebrities as the Spice Girls, Placebo, and Natalie Imbruglia. Her licensees include main brand, Michiko London, Sudo (wool and acrylic scarves), Ta Feng (umbrellas), Shin Myung Mool San (lighters), Chiyoda Bussan (footwear), Mandom (cosmetics), Gunze (leg wear), and Mitsubishi Rayon (casual wear). Her nightlife ensembles have become highly recognized in club environments: her name is first in the consumers mind in regards to club wear. Michiko produced bomber jackets for Boys Own, the seminal Balearic / Acid House fanzine, (which include original members Andrew Weatherall & Terry Farley, both known for extensive remix & production careers, DJing, record labels, etc., who started their DJing careers in Shoom) who were friends of Johny Rocca from Slough / Windsor, the UK manager for Koshino at the time. One of the most intriguing items she marketed under her name was condoms. At London Fashion Week 1987, she wore an inflatable black nylon dress, which received an originality compliment from the then prime minister Margaret Thatcher. She continued with the inflatable clothes theme at the 2016 Men's Fashion Week with inflatable jackets, having opened a sushi restaurant in London the same year. Koshino was also responsible along with David Roberts fashion stylist (consultant) for designing and environmentally friendly scooter for Honda.

== Inspiration and influences ==
Her inspiration is derived from urban streets and dance club environments. Music of the eighties and nineties are large influences in her designs. of modern Japanese society for her designs. Koshino was the designer for the final runway show of Stardoll's Elite, Kahlen's Next Top Model.

== In popular culture ==
In the NHK morning television drama Carnation, which was based on the life of Koshino's mother, Ayako Koshino, the part based on Michiko Koshino was played by Misako Yasuda.
