= Carnation (TV series) =

- Promotional poster
- Genre: Drama
- Written by: Aya Watanabe
- Directed by: Kenji Tanaka
- Starring: Machiko Ono; Mari Natsuki; Yumi Asō; Chiaki Kuriyama; Chiharu Niiyama; Terue Shōji; Akira Takarada; Yukiyo Toake; Masaomi Kondō; Kaoru Kobayashi
- Opening theme: "Carnation" by Ringo Sheena
- Composer: Kris Bowers
- Country of origin: Japan
- Original language: Japanese
- No. of episodes: 151

Production
- Producer: Atsushi Shirotani
- Running time: 15 minutes
- Production company: NHK Osaka

Original release
- Network: NHK
- Release: 3 October 2011 – 31 March 2012

Carnation (カーネーション, Kānēshon) is a Japanese historical drama television series and the 85th asadora series of NHK. It premiered on 3 October 2011 and ended on 31 March 2012. The series is inspired by the life of fashion designer Ayako Koshino in Kishiwada, Osaka. Ayako was the mother of famous designers Hiroko Koshino, Junko Koshino, and Michiko Koshino.

== Plot ==
The story begins in 1924 when Itoko Ohara is a rambunctious and free-spirited 11-year-old girl. The eldest daughter of Zensaku, who runs a small kimono fabric shop, and Chiyo, who left her rich family to elope with Zensaku, Itoko loves the Danjiri Matsuri, but is upset that girls are not allowed to participate. She finds a substitute in dressmaking after she sees Western dresses for the first time when visiting her grandparents in Kobe. After proceeding to girl's middle school, she gets her first glimpse of a sewing machine and becomes obsessed with working that device. Pressing her stern and obstinate father, who objects to Western clothing, she finally convinces him to let her leave school to pursue her dream. But she has to overcome many hurdles along the way, which she does through her persistence, creativity, and indefatigable nature. She first works at a shop that makes a form of men's underwear, but gets fired when times get hard. She finally convinces a sewing machine saleswoman to teach her Western dressmaking, and succeeds in designing and creating the uniforms of a Shinsaibashi department store, but Zensaku still makes her work at a series of establishments after he complains of her lack of business acumen. At first a tailor shop and then a fabric store, Itoko greatly increases business through hard work and innovation. Convinced that his daughter has grown and that kimono fabric is a dying business, Zensaku retires and hands the business over to Itoko, who finally opens her own Western dressmaking shop in 1934.

Masaru Kawamoto, who was Itoko's co-worker at the tailors, proposes marriage and enters the Ohara family as a mukoyōshi. The two have three daughters while running a successful business making Western-style clothes for men and women. But their world is profoundly changed by Japan's pursuit of war. Their neighbors Taizō Yasuoka and his younger brother Kansuke are both drafted and die in battle. Zensaku is badly burned in a fire at home and eventually dies. Itoko's former schoolmate Natsu, who ran a high-class ryōtei, has to sell it when business goes bad and then flees town to escape her debtors. Even Masaru is drafted and sadly dies of an illness at the front shortly before the war ends.

After the war, Itoko is able to rebound rather quickly and assists others in recovering as well. She helps Yaeko, Taizō's widow, resume her hair permanent business, and when she discovers that Natsu had become a prostitute for American servicemen, she convinces Tamae, Taizō's mother, to save Natsu by hiring her. Itoko joins the local fabric guild and meets a young tailor from Nagasaki named Ryūichi Suo. Through various circumstances, the two come to work together and fall in love—even though Suo has a wife and children. Resolving to solve the situation, Itoko supports Suo in opening his own shop and never sees him again.

As time passes, Itoko's three daughters begin to decide on their careers. Yūko, the eldest, initially wants to go to an art college, but when Itoko challenges her on whether she really wants to be an artist, she decides to attend a fashion design school in Tokyo instead. Naoko, who always seems to be fighting with Yūko, decides to go to the same school, much to Yūko's consternation—and then becomes the first to be successful by winning a major award. Yūko returns to Kishiwada after graduating to help her mother, but Naoko stays in Tokyo to open her own boutique. When it begins to flounder due to Naoko's abrasive personality, the gentler Yūko travels to Tokyo, despite being married and with a daughter, to help out. Meanwhile, Satoko, the youngest, who seems furthest removed from the clothing world, gives up a promising tennis career to learn dressmaking under her mother. Itoko, however, starts to feel her age as fashions change from Dior to Louis Vuitton to miniskirts, and contemplates handing over the business to Yūko. But Kishiwada is too small for Yūko, who starts her own boutique in Shinsaibashi. Even Satoko, whom Itoko thinks of giving the shop to next, decides to go to London to try her design skills.

The years pass and Itoko's daughters are solid successes in the fashion world. Yūko's daughter Rika, however, had become a rebellious youth who flees her mother to stay with Itoko. Through her grandmother's love, she finally finds herself and eventually begins working for her mother. Itoko helps others as well. Succumbing to the pleas of a son of an old friend, she designs some clothing for the elderly, and is such a success she starts her own brand of clothing that makes her even more famous. Doing a fashion show at a hospital, she runs into Natsu for the first time in decades, and even meets the daughter of Suo. Working everyday into her nineties, and even renovating her home, she collapses in March 2006 and dies in the hospital at the age of 92. The many she helped gather at her home and watch the Danjiri Festival from the window—while Yōko tells her sisters that a TV network wants to do an asadora of their mother's life.

== Cast ==
- Machiko Ono as Itoko Ohara, the heroine modeled after Ayako Koshino
- Mari Natsuki as Itoko Ohara as an old woman
- Akari Ninomiya as Itoko Ohara as a child, as well as Naoko Ohara as a child
- Kaoru Kobayashi as Zensaku Ohara, her father
- Yumi Asō as Chiyo Ohara, her mother
- Akira Takarada as Seizaburō Matsuzaka, her grandfather (Chiyo's father)
- Yukiyo Toake as Sadako Matsuzaka, her grandmother (Chiyo's mother)
- Daichi Watanabe as Isamu Matsuzaka, Seizaburo and Sadako's son
- Terue Shōji as Haru Ohara, her other grandmother (Zensaku's mother)
- Miyu Yagyū as Shizuko Ohara, her younger sister
- Taro Suruga as Masaru Kawamoto, her husband
- Chiharu Niiyama as Yūko Ohara, Itoko's eldest daughter
- Fujiko Kojima as Rika Ohara, Yūko's daughter
- Asami Kawasaki as Naoko Ohara, Itoko's second daughter
- Misako Yasuda as Satoko Ohara, Itoko's third daughter
- Chiaki Kuriyama as Natsu Yoshida, Itoko's childhood friend
- Kyōko Enami as Natsu Yoshida as an old woman
- Mari Hamada as Tamae Yasuoka, a neighborhood hairdresser
- Takamasa Suga as Taizō Yasuoka, her eldest son
- Hiroyuki Onoue as Kansuke Yasuoka, her second son and a childhood friend of Itoko
- Maki Tamaru as Yaeko Yasuoka, Taizō's wife
- Gō Ayano as Ryūichi Suo, a tailor from Nagasaki
- Hosshan as Tatsuo Kitamura, a ready-to-wear merchant
- Naomi Zaizen as Ryōko Negishi, who teaches Itoko how to sew Western-style dresses
- Itsuji Itao as the owner of the Suematsu Fabric Store
- Kōtarō Koizumi as Harutarō Nakamura, a kabuki actor
- Tomoka Kurotani as Sae, a dancehall girl
- Masahiro Kōmoto as Eisaku Kinomoto, a neighborhood electric appliance storekeeper
- Shōzō Uesugi as Yasuo Kioka, a neighborhood shoe storekeeper
- Shin'ya Tsukamoto as Takeshi Haraguchi, a teacher in Yūko's fashion design school

== Production ==
The start of the series was delayed, and the length of the series was shortened, due to the effects of the 2011 Tohoku earthquake on the NHK schedule. Machiko Ono was selected in an audition of 1850 actresses to play the lead role for the majority of the series. The veteran actress Mari Natsuki played the role from the age of 72 on, in broadcasts beginning 3 March 2012. The child actress Akari Ninomiya played both the heroine as a child and Itoko's daughter Naoko as a child.

Singer Ringo Sheena provided the theme song for the series, also titled "Carnation."

== Reception ==
Carnation is considered a notable ratings success. It captured an average of 19.1% of the audience in the Kanto region, the highest rating for an asadora since Dondo Hare in 2007. Its average rating of 19.6% for the Kansai region was the highest for an asadora since Kokoro in 2003.

== International broadcast ==
Country	Channel	Series premiere	Title
Sri Lanka	Rupavahini	2014	අත්තටු නෑ ඒත් එයා ඉගිලෙයි (Aththatu Na Aith Eya Igileyi)
Thailand	Thai PBS	1 March 2015 – 11 July 2015	ยอดหญิงนักออกแบบ (Yod Ying Nak Oak Baab)
Iran	IRIB TV2	25 April 2015 – 17 June 2015	میخک (Mikhak)
Trinidad and Tobago	CCN TV6	2016	Carnation
Mexico	Canal 22	2017	Clavel
Venezuela	VALE TV	2016	Clavel
Belarus	Belarus 3	17 October 2016 –	Гваздзік
Romania	TVR 3	17 October 2016 –	Aripi de matase
Paraguay	Telefuturo	October 2016 –	Clavel
Slovenia	RTVSLO	17 April 2017 – 31 July 2017	Nagelj
Jamaica	CVM Television	2017-	Carnation
Costa Rica	Sinart Canal 13	2017-	Clavel
Mongolia	UBS	1 August 2017 –	Лиш цэцэг
Serbia	RTS 3	28 March 2017 -	Karanfil/Каранфил
El Salvador	Canal 21	2018 - 2019	Clavel

== Accolades ==
Carnation was awarded the Grand Prix for best television program of 2011 at the 49th Galaxy Awards, given out by the Japan Council for Better Television and Radio.

Preceded by Ohisama	Asadora; 3 October 2011 – 31 March 2012	Succeeded by Umechan Sensei
