= Satomi Takasugi =

- Born: July 11, 1985 (age 41); Tokyo, Japan
- Genre: J-Pop
- Occupations: Singer
- Years active: 2006–present
- Label: Rhythm Zone
- Website: takasugi.tv/index.html

Satomi Takasugi (高杉 さと美, Takasugi Satomi; born July 11, 1985 in Tokyo) is a Japanese pop singer, race queen, and former gravure idol. She is signed to Avex Trax sub-label Rhythm Zone and represented by the talent agency, Platinum Production. She is a former member of the avex girl group With, with fellow gravure idols Chinatsu Wakatsuki, Iori, and Kana Hoshino.

== Biography ==
In 2001, Takasugi was discovered in Shibuya by the Platinum Production agency. While still in high school at the age of 16, in 2002 Takasugi along with Chinatsu Wakatsuk, Iori, and Kana Hoshino formed the gravure idol group With. As well as serving as gravure idols, the group also sang on the Avex label. The group went on to release a photobook but disbanded soon after, having little success.

In 2006, Takasugi made her first live performance at "Rhythm Nation 2006" sponsored by Avex, playing a cover of Yoshiyuki Ohsawa's "Soshite Boku wa Tohō ni Kureru". The song was later released promotionally on the radio and other media. Takasugi became part of Rhythm Zone, a sub-label of Avex specialising in urban music.

In 2007, Takasugi released her debut single, "Tabibito", which was used as the theme song of the film Saiyuki, inspired by Chinese folk tale Journey to the West. "Tabibito" reached number 10 in the Oricon charts and eventually sold over 40,000 copies. After being invited to participate at "a-nation '07", where Takasaugi was able to perform and promote herself at several places across Japan, she released her second single, "Hyakurenka", which was used as the ending theme of the NTV programs The Sunday and Adult no Shikaku.

She followed this up with double A-sides: "Tooku Hanaretemo" was used as the theme song for an Asahi TV Thursday mystery drama, Yukiboshi, and "No Side" was used as the Kobe Steel Group sports special theme song for the National High School Rugby Championship.

In 2008, Takasugi released her first album, Garden which contained all of her 2007 singles as well as a new single, "Issho ni", released on the same day. Soon after, Takasugi held her first solo live performance, Garden Party, in which she performed various songs from the album. Later that year she performed the theme song for the 25th Anniversary of the Disney Tokyo resort "Maho no Kagi: The Dream Goes On", as well as the theme song for the Nintendo DS video game Suikoden Tierkreis, "Tears in the Sky".

In 2009, Takasugi released her second album, Prism, which contained all her 2008 singles as well as a couple of new songs.

In 2010, Takasagi decided to take a different approach with the release of her music, opting to release three singles – "Sakurairo", "Now!", and "Futatsu no Sora" – digitally rather than on the traditional CD format, although all three singles eventually made their way onto her third album. Mascara, which was released in three editions – an album-only edition, an album and DVD edition, and an album and photobook edition.

After a hiatus, Takasugi released a new single, "Kimagure Dolce", in 2012.

== Discography ==
=== Studio albums ===
- 2008: Garden
- 2009: Prism
- 2010: Masacara

=== Singles ===
- 2007: "Tabibito" (旅人)
- 2007: "Hyaku Renka / Tōku Hanarete mo" (百恋歌 / 遠く離れても)
- 2007: "Yukiboshi / Soshite Boku wa Tohō ni Kureru" (雪星 / そして僕は途方に暮れる)
- 2008: "Issho ni" (一緒に)
- 2008: "Mahō no Kagi: The Dream Goes On" (魔法の鍵 ~The Dream Goes On)
- 2008: "Arigatō" (ありがとう)
- 2008: "Relation: Ano Kaze o Tadotte" (RELATION ~あの風を辿って~)
- 2008: "Tears in the Sky"
- 2010: "Sakurairo" (サクライロ)
- 2010: "Now!"
- 2010: "Futatsu no Sora" (ふたつの空)
- 2012: "Kimagure Dolce" (気まぐれドルチェ)
