= Chouriki Sentai Ohranger =

Japanese tokusatsu television series

- Title card
- Genre: Tokusatsu; Superhero fiction Drama; Science fantasy Action-adventure; Thriller
- Created by: Toei
- Developed by: Noboru Sugimura
- Directed by: Shōhei Tōjō; Masato Tsujino; Takeshi Ogasawara; Hiroshi Butsuda; Yoshiaki Kobayashi; Ryuta Tasaki
- Starring: Masaru Shishido; Kunio Masaoka; Masashi Goda; Ayumi Asō; Tamao Satō; Shōji Yamaguchi; Hiroshi Miyauchi
- Voices of: Akira Kamiya; Tōru Ōhira; Minori Matsushima; Tomokazu Seki; Miho Yamada; Nobuyuki Hiyama; Kaneta Kimotsuki; Shinobu Adachi
- Narrated by: Nobuo Tanaka
- Opening theme: "Olé! Ohranger" by Kentarō Hayami
- Ending theme: "Kinkyū Hasshin! Ohranger" by Kentarō Hayami "Nijiiro Crystal Sky" by Kentarō Hayami
- Composer: Seiji Yokoyama
- Country of origin: Japan
- Original language: Japanese
- No. of episodes: 48 (list of episodes)

Production
- Producers: Atsushi Kaji (TV Asahi); Susumu Yoshikawa; Takeyuki Suzuki; Shigenori Takadera (Toei); Kōichi Yada (Toei Agency)
- Production location: Tokyo, Japan (Greater Tokyo Area)
- Running time: approx. 25 minutes
- Production company: Toei Company

Original release
- Network: TV Asahi
- Release: March 3, 1995 – February 23, 1996

Related
- Ninja Sentai Kakuranger; Gekisou Sentai Carranger

Chouriki Sentai Ohranger (超力戦隊オーレンジャー, Chōriki Sentai Ōrenjā; Super-Powered Squadron Ohranger) is a Japanese television tokusatsu series broadcast by TV Asahi. The series is the 19th installment of Super Sentai. Directed by Shōhei Tōjō, Masato Tsujino, Takeshi Ogasawara, Hiroshi Butsuda, Yoshiaki Kobayashi, Ryuta Tasaki, it stars Masaru Shishido, Kunio Masaoka, Masashi Goda, Ayumi Asō, Tamao Satō, Shōji Yamaguchi and Hiroshi Miyauchi. It aired from March 3, 1995, to February 23, 1996, replacing Ninja Sentai Kakuranger and was replaced by Gekisou Sentai Carranger. It is the second ancient civilization–themed Super Sentai, preceded by Dai Sentai Goggle-V. Its footage was used in the American series Power Rangers Zeo (the closing credits of Zeo referred to it as "O Rangers").

In May 2016, Shout! Factory released "Chouriki Sentai Ohranger: The Complete Series" on DVD in North America in November 2016. Ohranger was released on DVD in North America on November 1, 2016. This is the fourth Super Sentai set to be released in North America. In addition on September 8, 2017, Shout! streamed the series on their website.

== Plot ==
In the year 1999, (Note: Ohranger originally took place in 1999, but was retconned to the contemporary year of 1995 in subsequent episodes.) the Machine Empire of Baranoia, led by Emperor Bacchushund, invades Earth with the intention of wiping out all human life and bringing about machine rule. Chief of Staff Miura revives super energies that had been born of the lost civilization of Pangaea. Assembling pieces of a stone plate uncovered three years previously, he reveals the secrets of Chouriki. Enlisting an elite five-man team of the U.A.O.H's finest pilots, Miura builds a pyramid to generate Tetrahedron power to allow five U.A.O.H officers to transform into the Ohrangers and stop Baranoia's invasion.

== Characters ==
=== Ohrangers ===
The Ohrangers (sans Riki) transformed. From left to right: Goro Hoshino, Shouhei Yokkaichi, Yuji Mita, Juri Nijou, and Momo Maruo.

The eponymous Ohrangers are a group of five soldiers from the U.A.O.H. (ユー・エー・オー・エイチ, Yū Ē Ō Eichi; United Airforce Overtech Hardware) and an immortal youthful ancient hero who battle the Machine Empire Baranoia. (Note: With the exception of Riki, their surnames bear the number of corners (or in Juri and Momo's case, a = which is just two lines and a circle which has no corners respectively) of their visor's shape while Goro's surname reflects the shape of his visor (a star).) They were originally normal humans until their body chemistry was slightly altered to utilize Chouriki (超力, Chōriki), a form of energy used by an ancient civilization dating back to a time when all the continents were Pangaea. Their special team attack is the Chouriki Dynamite Attack (超力ダイナマイトアタック, Chōriki Dainamaito Atakku).

The team utilizes two-piece Power Braces (パワーブレス, Pawā Buresu), or King Brace (キングブレス, Kingu Buresu) in the case of King Ranger, to transform. While transformed, the primary members each carry a King Blaster (キングブラスター, Kingu Burasutā) and a Battle Stick (バトルスティック, Batoru Sutikku) baton, which can combine to form the King Smasher (キングスマッシャー, Kingu Sumasshā) rifle, as their sidearms. They also ride Jetter Machine (ェッターマシン, Jettā Mashin) motorcycles for transportation. By combining their personal weapons and a King Smasher, they form the Big Bang Buster (ビッグバンバスター, Biggu Ban Basutā) to destroy human-sized Machine Beasts. Later in the series, they acquire the Giant Roller (ジャイアントローラー, Jaianto Rōrā) wheel and the Olé Bazooka (オーレバズーカ, Ōre Bazūka).

==== Goro Hoshino ====
Goro Hoshino (星野 吾郎, Hoshino Gorō) is a 25-year-old who fights as Oh Red (オーレッド, Ō Reddo). An ace pilot and the team U.A.O.H Captain, Goro is the first to receive his powers. He is a cool-headed and quick-thinking person, though his stubbornness brings him and his teammates much trouble at times. He is an expert in karate, kendo, and judo. The others call him "captain" (隊長, Taichō). Goro also appeared in Gaoranger vs. Super Sentai, along with his fellow Red Rangers from Akarenger to Time Red.

Goro appeared years later in Kaizoku Sentai Gokaiger, where he and his partner Momo created a distraction for the Gokaigers while Goro attempted to negotiate with Basco to gain the location of the Zangyack army. When this fell through, Goro was kidnapped by Basco, but was later rescued by the Gokaiger team. He then grants the Greater Power to the Gokaigers, which allows them to create their Gokai Galleon Buster.

As Oh Red, Goro wields the Star Riser (スターライザー, Sutā Raizā) sword, which allows him to perform the Secret Sword: Super-Power Riser (秘剣・超力ライザー, Hiken Chōriki Raizā) attack.

==== Shouhei Yokkaichi ====
Shouhei Yokkaichi (四日市 昌平, Yokkaichi Shōhei) is a 27-year-old second in-command and boxer who fights as Oh Green (オーグリーン, Ō Gurīn). Shouhei is chosen from the same division as Goro. He is cheerful, kind, and popular with children but is also serious and disciplined in work, being the oldest. He likes pork ramen and makes delicious gyoza.

As Oh Green, Shouhei dual wields the twin Square Crusher (スクエアクラッシャー, Sukuea Kurasshā) hatchets, which allow him to perform the Lightning: Super-Power Crusher (電光・超力クラッシャー, Denkō Chōriki Kurasshā) attack.

==== Yuji Mita ====
Yuji Mita (三田 裕司, Mita Yūji) is a 21-year-old who fights as Oh Blue (オーブルー, Ō Burū). A swift person, Yuji is an expert in fencing and gymnastics. His recklessness makes him the most childish member along with his way of speaking. Yuji uses jumps and mid-air fighting tactics.

As Oh Blue, Yuji dual wields the twin bladed Delta Tonfa (デルタトンファ, Deruta Tonfa), which allow him to perform the Lightning: Super-Power Tonfa (稲妻・超力トンファ, Inazuma Chōriki Tonfa) attack.

==== Juri Nijou ====
Juri Nijou (二条 樹里, Nijō Juri), a U.A.O.H Lieutenant, is a 22-year-old who fights as Oh Yellow (オーイエロー, Ō Ierō). Juri uses martial arts researched in the United States but she also likes dancing and aerobics, which is used in battle with great results. She loves fashion.

As Oh Yellow, Juri wields the Twin Baton (ツインバトン, Tsuin Baton) nunchaku, which allows her to perform the Explosion: Choriki Baton (炸裂・超力バトン, Sakuretsu Chōriki Baton) attack.

==== Momo Maruo ====
Momo Maruo (丸尾 桃, Maruo Momo), a U.A.O.H Lieutenant, is a 20-year-old who uses sanda and aikido and fights as Oh Pink (オーピンク, Ō Pinku). While separated from the others during the Bara Magma incident and losing her Power Brace, Momo is befriended by a German Shepherd named Johnny, referred to by the locals as a divine savior, who brought her to safety. With the help of Shouta, Momo finds Johnny with her Power Brace. She took Johnny's death hard as she avenged his death, only to find that he was still alive.

Momo appeared in Kaizoku Sentai Gokaiger and led the Gokaigers to believe she had in her possession the Greater Power of the Ohrangers, and would give it to the Gokaigers freely if they did errands for her. This was later revealed to be a ruse to keep the Gokaigers distracted.

As Oh Pink, Momo wields the Circle Defenser (サークルディフェンサー, Sākuru Difensā) shield, which allows her to perform the Hurricane: Choriki Defenser (疾風・超力ディフェンサー, Shippū Chōriki Difensā) attack.

==== Riki ====
Riki (リキ) is a child-like Legendary Chouriki hero of Pangaea who had been fighting against Machine Empire Baranoia, as the black/gold-colored King Ranger (キングレンジャー, Kingu Renjā) since ancient time, with an assignment to protect Dorin. He was put into suspended animation at some point until he is released 600 million years later in the present to aid his newfound teammates, the Ohrangers against the Empire, while continue to protect Dorin.

As explained by Dorin in Ohsama Sentai King-Ohger in Space, the effects of suspended animation slows down both Riki and Dorin's ages, by this time they physically grow up as young adults.

As King Ranger, Riki wields the King Stick (キングスティック, Kingu Sutikku) scepter, which allows him to perform the King Victory Flash (キングヴィクトリーフラッシュ, Kingu Vikutorī Furasshu) attack.

=== Allies ===
==== Naoyuki Miura ====
Chief of Staff Naoyuki Miura (三浦 尚之参謀長, Miura Naoyuki-sanbōchō) is the commander of Ohrangers and a dedicated leader who refuses to give up no matter what. An anthropologist and scientist as well, he learned of the ancient Pangaean civilization in 1996 and reverse-engineered Chouriki to create the Ohrangers' arsenal and mecha when they are needed. He once defeated a Baranoia Soldier with his bare hands after a U.A.O.H. soldier couldn't do it with a gun.

==== Dorin ====
The Dorin (ドリン) were the godlike people of Pangaea's alternate dimension, Chouriki World, the main source of the Ohrangers and their arsenals. One of the Dorin whom Riki is assigned to protect, takes on a female form. It is discovered that she is an important part of the Chouriki on Earth. She was first found sleeping inside King Pyramider. Although she died at the hands of Multiwa, she was revived in the finale. She has a green pet lizard named Paku (パク).

==== Gunmajin ====
Gunmajin (ガンマジン, Ganmajin) is an ancient warrior known for his honor and courage. According to Riki, Gunmajin appeared once 600 million years ago. Imprisoned within the form of a tiny tiki, the only way to unlock his power is by placing a key into his forehead and reciting the magic words "Gunma Gunma Dondoko Gunma" (ガンマガンマ ドンドコガンマ, Ganma Ganma Dondoko Ganma). For some reason, the key always ended up in the hands of a child and everyone knew the magic words after hearing them. When awakened, Gunmajin would grant a single wish to his discoverer as long as it didn't mean harm to anyone. There were times in which he simply didn't like the wish and refused to grant it or punish his awakener for lying to him. Gunmajin possessed the Mazin Saber (マジンサーベル, Majin Sāberu) through which he focused his power into the Majin One Sword Style (マジン一刀流, Majin Ittō Ryū) of Majin One Sword Fencing (Fire, Lightning, Wind, and Light). His back can act as a shield to defend himself and others (even King Pyramider's beam). In the series finale, he took Acha, Kocha, and Buldont, Jr. to his care. In Ohranger vs. Kakuranger, he is revealed to be terrified of Youkai (monsters fought by the Kakurangers).

==== Mikio ====
Mikio (ミキオ) is a boy who gets involved in battles between the Ohrangers and the Baranoia.

==== Nitta Family ====
The Nitta Family (新田一家, Nitta Ikka) is a family who gets involved in troubles caused by the Baranoia. They consist of Ichiro (一郎, Ichirō), his wife Satoko (里子), and their children Kiyomi (清美) and Yutaka (豊).

==== Kotaro Henna ====
Kotaro Henna (辺名 小太郎, Hen'na Kotarō) is a crazed robot expert who unintentionally causes trouble while wanting to see what makes Baranoia tick.

==== Shunpei Kirino ====
Shunpei Kirino (桐野 俊平, Kirino Shunpei) was a U.A.O.H officer who died trying to control the Red Puncher.

Kirino is portrayed by Kei Shindachiya (信達谷 圭, Shindachiya Kei).

=== Machine Empire Baranoia ===
The Machine Empire Baranoia (マシン帝国バラノイア, Mashin Teikoku Baranoia) is a cruel race of machines out to conquer Earth. It is led by Bacchushund and possesses a vast army of Baro Soldiers (バーロ兵, Bāro-hei). It had already conquered an entire chain of galaxies before reaching Earth.

- Emperor Bacchushund (皇帝バッカスフンド, Kōtei Bakkasuhundo) is the ruler of Baranoia, built 600 million years ago by an ancient race. He turned to evil and was banished into the depths of space by King Ranger. Seeing himself as a god, Bacchushund believes he has all right to conquer the world and make humans into his slaves. Very violent, tending to malfunction when he goes berserk, Bacchushund does not tolerate failure nor sentimentality in his minions' programming. In episode 33, it's later revealed Bacchushund had secretly been rebuilding some of his Machine Beasts and managed to harness the infinite energy from the Earth's magma. When his rebuilt Machine Beasts passed through the magma shower they became Super Machine Beasts. Thanks to the Ohrangers' "Trojan Horse" plan with the Blocker Robos, this facility was destroyed preventing any more Super Machine Beasts from being created. In episode 34, he grows in size and power thanks to the power of a space metal dark sword which, according to him, was the only one of its kind in the universe, which he intended to use on the Ohrangers. He is finally destroyed by Oh Blocker. But Bacchushund's head survives and gives the last of his energy to Buldont before shutting down for good.
- Empress Hysteria (皇妃ヒステリア, Kōhi Hisuteria) is the wife of Bacchushund, usually remaining in the palace devising plans with her husband, though she does go down to Earth by herself at times. She usually carries a metal fan with her and also a gun. She initially despised humans for their feelings but began to value life after Bomber the Great assumed command. Her body color changed from gold to silver when she gave all her power to her niece Multiwa, and as a result she aged into Dowager Empress Hysteria, now using what is left of her late husband's staff as a cane. She eventually self-destructs in order to protect her grandchild, sacrificing herself after the Ohrangers promised they would not harm the child.
- Prince Buldont (皇子ブルドント, Ōji Burudonto) is basically a robot child and son of Bacchushund and Hysteria. Mischievous and spoiled, he thought of humans as simple toys. He once attempted to direct his own movie, "Century of the Machine Empire", by using humans with no notion that they die from realism. He can fire lasers from his eyes. After his father's death, Buldont challenges Bomber the Great to a duel for the throne of Baranoia and loses with his body taken away by the exiled Hysteria. However, finding his father's head and receiving his remaining energy, Buldont reconfigured into the adult form of Kaiser Buldont (カイザーブルドント, Kaizā Burudonto). After returning to Baranoia and destroying Bomber the Great, Buldont regains the leadership of Baranoia. He and Multiwa make themselves grow without Acha and Kocha's help but are eventually destroyed in the series finale at the hands of King Pyramidder Battle Formation.
- Princess Multiwa (マルチーワ姫, Maruchīwa-hime) is Hysteria's niece and Buldont's cousin, skilled with a bow that can become a sword. While Bacchushund revives Buldont, Hysteria decides to do the same and sends all her 600 million years worth of energy to Multiwa who was sleeping on another planet waiting for the day to become the Machine Empress. Receiving the energy from her Aunt and a message of help she came to Earth interrupting the battle between Bomber and the Ohrangers. She aids Buldont in disfiguring Bomber and reprograming him into their slave before sending him to his death. The two marry after Buldont becomes the new ruler of Baranoia. She and Buldont make themselves grow without Acha and Kocha's help. She eventually dies by her husband's side at the hands of King Pyramidder Battle Formation's Super Legend Beam, but not before she bears him a son.
- Buldont Jr. (ブルドントJr., Burudonto Junia) is Kaiser Buldont and Princess Multiwa's child. After his birth, his parents are destroyed by King Pyramider and his grandmother Empress Hysteria sacrifices herself after the Ohrangers promise her not to harm the child. The Ohrangers hand Buldont Jr. over to Gunmajin just before he departs for his own planet.
- Bomber the Great (ボンバー・ザ・グレート, Bonbā Za Gurēto), known as the "Universal Bomb Bastard" (宇宙の爆弾野郎, Uchū no Bakudan Yarō), was just another one of Baranoia's Machine Beasts, yet was able to turn his entire body into a missile. He was exiled after a failed attempt to take over the Baranoia Empire, only to return upon hearing of the death of Bacchushund to try to retake over. This time he set his sights on trying to take over the empty throne. After revising the Baranoian Constitution, Art 12, Bomber challenged Buldont to a duel for the Empire which he won and banished Buldont, proclaiming himself "Bomber the Great the 1st, new Emperor of Baranoia". At first, being new to the throne, Bomber did his best at leading the Empire, trying to win Hysteria's affections and kill the Ohrangers in the process, but consistently met with failure in both prospects, exiling Hysteria as a result. Kaiser Buldont returned to take back his birthright and Multiwa took control of Bomber by reprogramming him after they took out his arms, replacing them with a sword and a bunker. Bomber was soon sent on a suicide mission to kill the Ohrangers but was destroyed by King Pyramider Battle Formation (Oh Blocker) before he could accomplish this. Suddenly, a smaller missile called the Great Missile appeared shortly afterward, to destroy the sun, only to be flung towards the other side of space by Gunmajin to be destroyed for good.
- Butler Acha (執事アチャ, Shitsuji Acha) is Baranoia's lightbulb-themed imperial family butler who follows whoever is in command at the time, reading their War Declaration and other proclamations. Took care of young Buldont when in the field, even serving as the producer of his movie. But for all his work, Acha never gets any respect from the imperial family who abuse him at times. When Bomber the Great took over, he simply forgot about Hysteria and served him. When Buldont returned, the same happened, Acha couldn't care less about Bomber. At the end of the series, he turned good and went with Kocha, and Buldont Jr., and Gunmajin back to Gunmajin's planet.
  - Butler Kocha (執事コチャ, Shitsuji Kocha) is a miniature weighing scale-themed robot who served the family alongside Acha, always on her partner's shoulder like a pirate captain's parrot. Though not much of a fighter due to her size, Kocha can fire beams from her chest. In episode 8, Kocha was outfitted with the Giant System, enabling her to become a hammer for Acha to fling at a Machine Beast, transmitting an enlarging beam into it. At the series finale, Kocha was taken by Gunmajin back to Gunmajin's home planet.
- Machine Beast Tamer Keris (マシン獣使いケリス, Mashinjū Tsukai Kerisu) is an animal trainer/dominatrix-themed Officer placed in charge of taming feral Machine Beasts, having her personal dome. When Bacchushund learns of Riki's return, he frantically requests her aid by having her go after Dorin with Yuji, Juri, and Momo attempting to protect her. But after King Ranger arrives and destroys Bara Goblin, Keris assumes her true buxom form as she enlarges and captures King Ranger before taking into her domain. She then uses Bara King to capture little girls in order to make them her new pets after splicing them with animal DNA, with Dorin as the crown jewel in her collection. However, an eagle hinders Keris from capturing Dorin at the cost of its life as the Ohrangers arrive to the girl's aid. Enlarging into her true form, Keris traps Ohranger Robo in an electrified cage until King Pyramider frees it, with OhRed saving the girls before calling in Red Puncher. Keris is then destroyed by King Pyramider Battle Formation. Keris is portrayed by Akiko Amamatsuri (天祭 揚子, Amamatsuri Akiko).
- Camera Trick (カメラトリック, Kamera Torikku) is a small bird-resembling video camera monster, serving as a recon for Baranoia's forces.
- Seiichi Kuroda (黒田 精一, Kuroda Seiichi) is a robotics scientist who stole Yuji's Power Brace so he could power his android son Shigeru (茂), whom he built in the image of his dead son. Furthermore, because he cares more for machines than people, he allied himself with Baranoia in a shaky alliance of sorts. But once the actions of Bara Vacuum exposed Shigeru's true nature, Kuroda offer Bacchushund the power of Chouriki in return for a permanent means to keep Shigeru active along with being viceroy of the Baranoian-ruled Earth. Converted into a cyborg, Kuroda captures the Ohrangers one by one while integrating Shigeru into his systems. However, Shigeru manages to break free and free the others. As a result, Bara Ivy is activated to kill them all as Kuroda sacrifices himself so the Ohrangers can get Shigeru out of harm's way. Seiichi Kuroda is portrayed by Isamu Ichikawa (市川 勇, Ichikawa Isamu).
- The Barlo Soldiers (バーロ兵, Bāro-hei) are Mass-produced industrial robot troops of the Machine Empire of Baranoia. Their movements and general behavior are similar to that of monkeys. They have sticks similar to the one wielded by Sun Wukong that can extend into battle staffs or spears and give off an electric shock, as weapons and their heads can open so they can throw cutter discs or nets from their mouths and energy blasts from their eyes. They pilot the Takonpas jet fighters. The Barlo Soldiers are voiced by Tomoyuki Horita (堀田 智之, Horita Tomoyuki).
- The Takonpas (タコンパス, Takonpasu) are octopus-like Jet fighters which could switch to a "walking" mode, usually piloted by the Barlo Soldiers. Takonpas seems to be a direct homage to the Martian Tripods in H.G. Wells' novel, War of the Worlds.
- The Baracticas (バラクティカ, Barakutika) are battleships in the shape of gears, they can hold up to hundreds of Takonpas and are the means of transportation from Baranoia to Earth.

==== Machine Beasts ====
Built on the dark side of the Moon by Baranoia, the Machine Beasts (マシン獣, Mashin-jū) are the main weapons used for Earth's invasion. There would be different types of Machine Beasts, from mindless weapons of destruction to robots with intelligence or feelings superior to that of humans.

- Bara Drill (バラドリル, Bara Doriru; 1, 33): The first Machine Beast to be sent to Earth, able to fold its limbs into its body to move. Attacking Shoichi and his group after they are derailed from joining the Ohranger program, Bara Drill is stopped by Goro as he became Oh Red and single-handedly destroys the monster. A second giant Bara Drill was later built into a Super Machine Beast, only to be destroyed by Green Blocker.
- Bara Saucer (バラソーサー, Bara Sōsā; 2, 33): A giant Machine Beast with tentacle arms that Baranoia sent to destroy Tokyo when their demands are not met. Bara Saucer rampaged until the assembled Ohrangers arrive with OhRed and OhGreen holding the Machine Beast while the others save teacher and her students. Managing to hack the giant apart with their weapons, the Ohrangers finish Bara Saucer off with the Big Bang Buster. A second giant Bara Saucer was built as a Super Machine Beast, only to be destroyed by Blue Blocker.
- Bara Vanish (バラバニッシュ, Bara Banisshu; 3, 33): A land mine-like Machine Beast sent to Earth in retaliation for the Ohrangers' debut by targeting a boy named Kenichi Matsumoto in a scheme to reverse engineer Chouriki from his memories of a part of a Pangaean slab he and his father found. Equipped with a solar-powered sensor, Bara Vanish is able to turn itself invisible to get an advantage over its opponents in sunlit areas. After Oh Red heavily damages it when about to access Kenichi's memories, disabling its invisibility, Bara Vanish is destroyed by the Big Bang Buster. A second giant Bara Vanish is built to become a Super Machine Beast, but was destroyed before the process was completed.
- Bara Crusher (バラクラッシャー, Bara Kurasshā; 4, 33): A ravenous piranha/tank-themed Machine Beast brought to Earth by Acha as part of the Human/Machine Beast hybridization plan by using the monster's Metal Amoebas to convert any organic being into a clone of itself. Once on Earth, Bara Crusher ends up in the boiler room of an apartment building before the Ohrangers find it. Though destroyed by the King Smashers, Bara Crusher bit a police officer named Officer Otani just prior to its death, infecting the man as he became the new Bara Crusher and kidnaps his son Hiroshi and four other children to infect them. But the Ohrangers interfere as Officer Otani regains himself and attempts suicide to protect Hiroshi before the Machine Beast manifests again. Learning of Bara Crusher's fear of fire, Oh Red uses it to force the Metal Amoeba out of Officer Otani's body and blast it to bits. A third giant Bara Crusher was built in 33 as a Super Machine Beast, only to be destroyed by Yellow and Pink Blockers.
- Bara Cactus 1 & 2 (バラカクタス, Bara Kakutasu 1 & 2; 5): Brother cactus-themed robots who are loyal to each other, able to disburse a pollen that causes humans to become mindless machine creatures able to gain the ability from whatever they eat. Arriving to Earth first, Bara Cactus 1 used his pollen to infect a boy named Takashi before using it on other humans. Once his younger Bara Cactus 2 arrives, the brothers overwhelm the Ohrangers with their power until Bara Cactus 1 notices Takashi being protected by his older brother Tsuyoshi and is confused of seeing the same sibling loyalty he and his brother have. Summoned back to the Baranoia Moon Base, Bara Cactus 1 is scolded for his sentimentality as he is ordered to deal with the Ohrangers alone or Bara Cactus 2 would be destroyed. With Takeshi supporting him, Bara Cactus 1 overpowers the Ohrangers until Tsuyoshi snaps his brother out of it as the two and Yuji uses the Star Riser to run the Machine Beast through. Though Bara Cactus 1 survived both the stab and then the King Smashers, he returned to the Baranoia Moon Base to find that his brother has been dismantled. He was then blown up into pieces by Bacchushund himself, who deems him and his brother as failed creations.
- Bara Brain (バラブレイン, Bara Burein; 6 & 7): A cunning brain-themed Machine Beast who is a psychic. Hysteria sends him to target Chief Miura, probing his mind to get him through the daughter of Miura's deceased UAOH comrade Mitsuko Endo. Separating them, Bara Brain creates Bara Separate as he assumes a sphere form to take control of Mitsuko, capturing Chief Miura and using his guilt to trick him into revealing the location of the UAOH base. Annoyed, Bara Brain changes plans to threats of killing Mitsuko with his telekinesis if Miura refuses to comply. But OhRed, OhGreen, and OhYellow arrive to save Miura and Mitsuko with Bara Brain in pursuit of the former. Capturing Miura, Bara Brain threatened the Ohrangers to show themselves before noon. But the Ohrangers arrive in the completed Chouriki Mobiles, with Bara Brain piloting a Takompas to battle OhRed in the Sky Phoenix. In the end, Bara Brain died in conjunction with Bara Separate due being linked mentally to it.
  - Bara Separate (バラセパレート, Bara Separēto; 6 & 7): Originally Bara Brain's right eye, the sphere-like Bara Separate enlarges and assimilates surrounding vehicle matter to assume a starfish-themed Machine Beast form, able to radiate destructive lightning and fire powerful blasts from its arms. The top segment of the star on his back could detach and transform into a boomerang of destructive energy. Separate also had the ability to transform into a large metal sphere, making it practically invulnerable to any attack. Being too powerful, the Oh Blue and Oh Pink are forced to use Dash Leon and Mao Loader while the others rescue Miura. But Bara Separate defeats them before pursuing is Miura when Oh Red attempts to get him out of harm's way. Completing the Chouriki Mobiles, the Ohrangers take out the Takonpas before forming Ohranger Robo and scrap Bara Separate's sphere before it could rebuilt itself.
- Bara Missiler (バラミサイラー, Bara Misairā; 8, 33): Bara Missiler is a missile launcher-themed robot that comes from the army on the planet Daurora, capable of flying at extreme speeds and could operate in outer space. Summoned to attack the city from a distance with the missiles he fires from his arms and shoulders, he lures the Ohrangers to the open before Oh Red wounds him. But Bara Missiler is made a giant by Acha and Kocha, overpowering Ohranger Robo before firing chains from his torso to drag the mecha and its pilots into the sun's gravitational field. But using the Head system, the Ohrangers escape death with Ohranger Robo destroying Bara Missiler with Crown Final Crash. Another giant Bara Missiler is built as a Super Machine Beast before being destroyed by Red Blocker.
- Steampunk (スチームパンク, Suchīmupanku; Movie): A robotic train-like monster who says "baby" in his sentences and could turn into an actual train. Steam Punk was created when all the monsters in the movie fused together into one monster, abducting the children due to being a weak monster. Once he lost his leverage, Steam Punk shrank and attempted to escape on a train track. But, Ohranger Robo sliced the track apart with Super Crown Crash, with Steam Punk unable to stop as he fell to his death below.
  - Locker Knight (ロッカーナイト, Mashinju Rokkānaito): A robotic shower-head-themed monster that rides on horseback and use his rod to fire lightning.
  - Cat Signal (ネコシグナル, Nekoshigunaru): A robotic traffic sign-themed monster with cat ears, who uses an oil lantern and keychains as weapons and can fire a beam from his eye.
  - Kabochumpkin (カボチャンプキン, Kabochanpukin): A robotic Jack-o'-lantern/witch-themed monster, he uses a broom as a weapon.
  - Jagchuck (ジャグチャック, Jaguchakku): A robotic faucet/plumber-themed monster, able to extend his mouth and fire water from the faucet on his belly or his mouth. Was rebuilt into the stronger Machine Beast: Bara Jaguchi (バラジャグチ, Bara Jaguchi; 31), only to be killed by King Pyramider Battle Formation.
- Bara Darts (バラダーツ, Bara Dātsu; 9, 33): A scorpion-themed Machine Beast who able to shoot Poison Darts on his tail, causing the target to be infected with a rusting poison. Sent to disable the Ohrangers' ability to use the Ohranger Robo, Bara Darts infects Goro, Shouhei and Yuji through trickery. But when Momo and Juri arrive to beat the Machine Beast for taking out their male teammates, he reveals be in possession of an antidote before Juri offers to work for Bara Darts, winning the Machine Beast's trust by going after Momo and attempts to kill her. However, it all turned out to be a farce by Juri to weasel the antidote into her hands by faking being accidentally hit by a Poison Dart, only to learn she was given a fake container. But Momo uses a hologram to trick Bara Darts in giving the real antidote. After playing football keep away with Acha and the Baras, Momo takes the antidote to the guys while Juri holds off their pursuers. Arriving to Juri's aid in full force, the Ohranger men take out the Baras while the female members double team Bara Darts before being defeated Oh Red's sword. But after being enlarged by Kocha, Bara Darts battles Ohranger Robo and is weaken by robot's Vulcan and Cannon Head configurations before being scrapped by the Crown Final Crash. Another giant Bara Darts was built to become a Super Machine Beast, but was destroyed before it could become one.
- Bara Hacker (バラハッカー, Bara Hakkā; 10): A computer-themed Machine Beast able to upload a wide array of weapons at his disposal from saws to bombs. On Buldont's suggestion, Bara Hacker is sent to hack into the UAOH database to access vital info on the Ohrangers' Chouriki Mobiles. Though unable to get the Chouriki Mobile data, Bara Hacker accessed the Ohrangers' arsenal and thus can counter any of the Ohrangers' current weapons. Bara Hacker then proceed to take control of all digital processes in the city, causing anarchy as a result as part of a distraction to access the Chouriki Mobile data at the databank. However, Bara Hacker fell into the Ohrangers' trap and counters their King Smashers and then the Big Bang Buster. However, the Oh Red uses the newly introduced Giant Roller to defeat Bara Hacker, who had no data for him to devise a counter against. Once enlarged by Kocha, Bara Hacker battles Ohranger Robo and is overwhelmed by Horn and Graviton Head configurations with his screen shattered before being scrapped by the Crown Final Crash.
- Bara Printer (バラプリンター, Bara Purintā; 11, 33): A crab/camera shutter-themed Machine Beast known as the Baranoian matchmaker, able to scan an image of an object and use it to make people fall in love with it. When seeing that humans took their everyday appliances for granted, Hysteria summoned Bara Printer to use his beam to cause his human victims to fall in love over their appliances. He battles the Ohrangers when they catch wind of his scheme, driving them off as a result. When Hysteria calls for a change of plans to make humans fall for Baranoia and use them to do their dirty work, Acha is sent to see it through. However, Shouhei plays on Acha's own desire to be appreciated for his hard work, convincing Acha's footman to make him a loved figure in the world. Working out as he hoped, Shouhei manages to reflect one of Bara Printer's beams back at him, causing him to obsessed over him and chases him down to embrace him. After making light of Acha's plight and suggesting a honeymoon vacation, Kocha accepts Acha's pleas and blasts Bara Printer back to normal. After being weakened by Oh Green's Crusher attack, Bara Printer is defeated with the Giant Roller. Once enlarged by Kocha, Bara Printer battles Ohranger Robo and is weakened by the Horn Head configuration before being scrapped by the Crown Final Crash. Another giant Bara Printer was built to become a Super Machine Beast but was destroyed before it could become one.
- Bara Baby (バラベイビー, Bara Beibī; 12): A baby/clown-themed Machine Beast sent by Bacchushund in a plan to make humans hate babies, thus ensuring the end of the human race. Bara Baby performs this by shooting projecting a beam with the orb on his head, causing any baby within ideal distance to project painful sound waves upon crying that can cause mass damage. The Ohrangers battle Bara Baby as he was about to alter another baby, causing the babies he affected to cause citywide damage to cover his escape. However, Acha reveals the plan is bound to fail due to the mothers' love for their children. As a result, a change of plans is required as Bara Baby kidnaps baby Kou and places him nearby an industrial area so his cries can cause an explosion that would affect the entire city. While others fight off the Baras, Goro fights his way to Kou and saves the baby. Once Kou is given to his mother, the Ohrangers use the Big Bang Buster to take out Bara Baby. Revitalized as a giant, Bara Baby battles Ohranger Robo until he is destroyed with the Crown Final Crash.
- Bara Magma (バラマグマ, Bara Maguma; 13, 33): A miner/rock drill-based Machine Beast with smaller mechanoid that enables him to use his Magma Beam and Magma Missile attacks. He is sent to Mt. Fuji to make the volcano active in Buldont's scheme to destroy Tokyo. When the Ohrangers arrive, Bara Magma pursues Momo as he eludes him with the aid of Johnny. Later, Bara Magma proceeds to shove a boy Shouta into the pit as Johnny saves the boy and bites Buldont's hand in the process. As a result, Hysteria has Bara Magma kill off the dog for harming her son. Enraged, Oh Pink battles her way to Bara Magma, fighting him in spite of her injuries until the others arrives and they use the Giant Roller to defeat him. Revitalized a giant, Bara Magma battles Ohranger Robo, with Final Crown Crash finishing him off. Another giant Bara Magma was built to become a Super Machine Beast but was destroyed before it could become one.
- Bara Pinokiller (バラピノキラー, Bara Pinokirā; 14): A Pinocchio-themed Machine Beast created as a scheme to take out the humans while their guard is down with the mass production of Pinocchio-themed robots as Juri brought a Pet Pinocchio. Donning a cloak and mask, Pinokiller attacks Goro and Juri as the others arrive, forced to run off and leave his disguise behind. While investigating the matter, Acha plants a detonation device in Juri's Pet Pinocchio in a plan to blow the UAOH up, with Goro chucking the robot away. Exposed, Bara Pinokiller attempts to kill everyone in the factory, including the son of the restaurant owner. When the Ohrangers arrive, Bara Pinokiller assumes his true form as Shouhei saves the people as the other Ohrangers battle Bara Pinokiller as the factory explodes. With the people running to safety, the Ohrangers defeat Bara Pinokiller with the Giant Roller as he then revitalized a giant. Forming Ohranger Robo, the Ohrangers use the Vulcan Head and Horn Head formations before using the Super Crown Sword to severe the monster's nose before being destroyed.
- Bara Revenger (バラリベンジャー, Bara Ribenjā; 15): A scrap metal-themed Machine Beast formed from the collected robot pieces at Baranoia's junkyard that were discarded and motivated by the grudges of every part he is composed of. Unlike the others, Bara Revenger wanted nothing to do with Baranoia other than to kill Bacchushund yet his power supply is very low. After being knocked off of the moon after being unable to defeat Bacchushund one on one, Bara Revenger descended onto Earth where he attempts to increase his power before he shuts down until the Ohrangers arrives on the scene as he invades them. Though distrusting him at first like others, Yuji attempts to befriend Bara Revenger as he saved a dog from being run over by a car on the street. After being saved with a Chouriki transfusion when about to shut down, Bara Revenger is astonished of the selfless act and vows to help him. However, Acha arrives and has the Baras attack Bara Revenger and Oh Blue. When the others arrive, Bacchushund shows up as he has Acha implant a remote-controlled control device to force Bara Revenger into fighting the Ohrangers against his will. In spite of his attempts to snap Bara Revenger out of it, Oh Blue is forced to mortally wound him with the Giant Roller, returning him to normal as the Ohrangers vow to succeed where he failed as he limps off to a garbage dump where he shuts down and re-crumbles into spare parts.
- Bara Devil (バラデビル, Bara Debiru; 16): A piano/clock/maestro-themed Machine Beast who could attack with music from the piano on his solar plexus, sent by Buldont to play his Devil World symphony to invoke natural disasters. But as Shouhei arrives, a boy named Jun comes from the future as a result of Time Split caused by the music. Because the Jun's pendant can counteract his music, Bara Devil goes after him. He enlarges as OhGreen calls for the Chouriki Mobiles, with Oh Red using the Giant Roller to free his comrade from Bara Devil's grip as Oh Green borrows Jun's pendant for Miura to analyze as Ohranger Robo battles Bara Devil. Using the Horn Head formation, Ohranger Robo forces a timeslip to occur so Jun can return to his time. With that done, Bara Devil is destroyed by with the Crown Final Crash.
- Bara Vacuum (バラバキューム, Bara Bakyūmu; 17, 33): A vacuum cleaner-themed Machine Beast brought in by Buldont to acquire Yuji's Power Brace from Seiichi Kuroda, able to suck people up into his vacuum-like tube. and use his machine forearm. After sucking Yuji in, Bara Vacuum goes after the Power Brace in a keep away until he sucks Oh Red in with the Power Brace. Once Yuji gets his Power Brace back, he and OhRed get out and fight Bara Vacuum before the Ohrangers finish him off with the Giant Roller. Once revitalize by Kocha, Bara Vacuum, Ohranger Robo uses Graviton Head formation before destroying him with the Crown Final Crash. Another giant Bara Vacuum was built to become a Super Machine Beast but was destroyed before it could become one.
- Bara Ivy (バラアイビー, Bara Aibī; 18, 33): An ivy-themed Machine Beast that is able to burrow underground and uses his vines to attack people. Integrated into Kuroda's body, Bara Ivy kidnaps Momo, Shouhei and Juri while activating Shigeru's programming to be also integrated into Kuroda's cyborg body as well. When Shigeru breaks out of Kuroda's control, Bara Ivy disconnects from Kuroda and kills him before fighting the Ohrangers as they use the Big Bang Buster to deactivate him. Revitalized by Kocha, Bara Ivy battles Ohranger Robo and is destroyed by the Crown Final Crash. Another giant Bara Ivy was built to become a Super Machine Beast but was destroyed before it could become one.
- Bara Builder (バラビルダー, Bara Birudā; 19): A gigantic human body-themed Machine Beast. Bacchushund has suck up the city's electricity before fighting Ohranger Robo, displaying its abilities to self-upgrade itself into a bodybuilding-themed form to counter Ohranger Robo's abilities. Faking a surrender, Bara Builder drains Ohranger Robo of its energy before heavily damaging the giant robot. Learning of Red Puncher's existence, Bacchushund attempts to stop Oh Red from getting to the new robot. But once awakened and Oh Red soothes the mecha's berserker nature, Red Puncher destroys Bara Builder with Puncher Gatling.
- Bara Boxer (バラボクサー, Bara Bokusā; 20): A boxer-themed robot armed with a boxing bell mallet that Buldont had built to counter Red Puncher. First appearing in normal size, Bara Boxer proves his combat superiority to Oh Green before being enlarged to overpowers Red Puncher in what turned out to be an Exhibition Match. After being fitted with spiked boxing gloves, Bara Boxer is sent back to Earth to finish the job. But due to learning some boxing moves from Shouhei and friends, Oh Red uses Red Puncher in its full fighting potential to turn the tables before destroying Bara Boxer with Magna Puncher.
- Bara Kendama (バラケンダマ, Bara Kendama; 21): Built in the likeness of the giant Kendama Robo, Bara Kendama was used by Hysteria pose as the robot when it was donated to be piloted by Oh Blue. Once the trap is sprung, Bara Kendama assumes his true face and hold Yuji hostage he goes on a rampage with Hysteria. Oh Red is powerless to fight back in the Red Puncher out of fear of killing his teammate until he leads Bara Kendama into a trap by Oh Green piloting Kendama Robo. This allows Oh Pink and Oh Yellow to get Yuji out so Red Puncher can finish the Machine Beast off with its Magna Puncher.
- Bara Madillo (バラマジロ, Bara Majiro; 22): A gigantic armadillo-themed robot that could roll up into a spiked ball, making it nearly invulnerable to various attacks. Bara Madillo easily overpowered Ohranger Robo and Red Puncher, forcing them to attempt to form Buster Ohranger Robo. But as the two robots are unable to due to the latter's memory chip missing, Ohranger Robo and Red Puncher are forced to fall back. Learning that the chip ended up in the possession of a boy named Satoru, Bara Madillo is sent after the boy with Ohranger Robo holding the Machine Beast off while Oh Red gets Satoru to safety. But after Bacchushund destroys the portable computer holding the chip, it turns out Goro got tattooed by the blast with program code on his back which Miura types into Red Puncher's programming as it is deployed. Once Buster Ohranger Robo is formed, it uses Big Cannon Burst to destroy Bara Madillo.
- Bara Clothes (バラクローズ, Bara Kurōzu; 23): A silkworm-themed Machine Beast who could spray silk from his mouth. After finding Buldont and Bacchushund with a swimsuit issue, an upset Hysteria deploys Bara Clothes to use his powers to convert people's outfits into battle armor that allows him to control the wearers through the projection from his head. The male Ohrangers and Momo are among the affected as Juri is forced to run off after her Power Brace is taken. Though overpowered and outnumbered, Juri realized Bara Clothes' method and resorted in fighting him in a bikini as she breaks the Machine Beast's hold over her teammates. Once defeated by Ohrangers, Bara Clothes is enlarged as Ohranger Robo fights him with Red Puncher's support before they form Buster Ohranger Robo and destroy him.
- Bara Excellency (バラカッカ, Bara Kakka; 24): An odd admiral/king playing card/iron maiden-themed robot able to assume human form, Bara Kekka arrives to Japan during Tanabata. Falling in love with Momo at first sight, having an obsession over the girl and uses his talents as a master of disguise and dimensions to cause trouble for her as he makes his declaration of love to her while assuming his true form when she turns him down. Though he had the advantage over Oh Pink and intended to boil her alive, Bara Kakka has a change of heart after Auntie stops him and puts him in his place. After freeing Momo, Bara Kakka is reminded his mission as the Ohrangers fight him before they defeat him with the Giant Roller. Enlarged, Bara Kakka battles Ohranger Robo and Red Puncher before they form Buster Ohranger Robo to finish him off.
- Bara Hungry (バラハングリー, Bara Hangurī; 25): A rice cooker-themed Machine Beast with a hard body able to cover food in a mold. However, he sidetracks when he intrudes a family celebrating the father's birthday, literally eating them out of house and home before he gets drunk on sake. The Ohrangers acquire the unconscious Bara Hungry and attempt to blow him up when Acha reactivates Bara Hungry as he runs off. After a scolding from Acha, Bara Hungry resumes his plan until the Ohrangers lure him out in a festive battle. Distracted by festive dancing, Bara Hungry is tricked into drinking sake and gets too drunk to defend himself against the new Ole Bazooka. After being enlarged, Bara Hungry covers Ohranger Robo in mold before proceeding to eat it piece by piece. Again distracted, Bara Hungry is sucker punched by Red Puncher as the Machine Beast is destroyed by Buster Ohranger Robo.
- Bara Goblin (バラゴブリン, Bara Goburin; 26 & 27): A cattle/wolf-like Machine Beast kept in a cage by Keris as a pet, she summons Bara Goblin to handle Oh Blue, Oh Yellow, and Oh Pink while attempting to kill Dorin. But before he can get to Dorin, Riki arrives to save her. Becoming King Ranger, he uses King Victory Flash to defeats Bara Goblin before Kocha enlarges him. After overpowering Ohranger Robo and Red Puncher, Bara Goblin is easily destroyed by King Pyramider.
- Bara King (バラキング, Bara Kingu; 27 & 28): Another of Keris' pets, Bara King is an Anubis-themed robot who was designed after King Ranger after she abducts him. Sent to Earth to capture little girls for his mistress' plan, Bara King is made to mess with the Ohrangers by making them think Riki is converted into a Machine Beast. But once Riki returns, the truth is revealed as King Ranger defeats Bara King. Once enlarged by Kocha, Bara King aids Keris in fighting Ohranger Robo and Red Puncher. But once King Pyramider assumes Carrier Formation, Bara King is destroyed by its barrage.
- Bara Tarantula (バラタランチュラ, Bara Taranchura; 29): A tarantula-themed robot able to shrink into a spider used by Acha to implant children with receivers to make it seem that they are geniuses. The Machine Beast can also use the receivers and the mini-spiders on his body to control his targets. After getting the signal in her nephew's class, Juri and company track down Bara Tarantula's signal to his hideout. After being defeated by King Ranger and damaged by the Ole Bazooka, Bara Tarantula is enlarged by Kocha before overpowering Ohranger Robo and Red Puncher until King Pyramider intervened. In the end, Bara Tarantula is scrapped by King Pyramider Battle Formation.
- Bara Gusuka (バラグースカ, Bara Gūsuka; 30): A sloth-like Machine Beast with a nightcap whose very presence and singing causes everyone around him to sleep. Though Bacchushund wanted the Machine Beast scrapped for it, Hysteria suggests using him on the humans. After the Takonpas he was on was shot down, Bara Gusuka manages to put the Ohrangers to sleep so Acha can kill them. However, immune to the Machine Beast's effects, King Ranger interferes and is able to scrap Bara Gusuka as he was immune. However, Henna rebuilds Bara Gusuka into a wind-up toy-themed lullaby machine, resuming his mission before Acha remodifies Bara Gusuka into a fighting machine with a megaphone where his face used to be. While his second form was much more powerful to have King Ranger feel the effects along people far away, Bara Gusuka is stopped when Dorin has Paku bite the power cord. Rendered powerless, Bara Gusaka is taken down by the Ole Bazooka. Enlarged by Kocha, Bara Gusuka is easily scrapped by King Pyramider Battle Formation to Hysteria's dismay.
- Bara Nightmare (バラナイトメア, Bara Naitomea; 32): A white brain/mad scientist/butcher-themed robot that wields a cleaver, with the power to trap people's minds in his dream world. He defied Baranoia and fled to Earth in the year 1988, taking on a disguise of a human covered in black robes. A psychotic hebephile, he began abducting young girls he fancied and trapped their minds in his nightmare while keeping their bodies in suspended animation. This way he could watch them live out his fantasies forever. But his original victim was Momo's best friend Mayumi, and after eleven years her mind reached out to momo in dreams for help. When Momo began investigating he tried to trap her in his nightmare but was thwarted by her fellow Ohrangers. Killed by the Chouriki Dynamite Group attack, and the girls were freed to resume their stolen lives.
- Bara Mammoth (バラマンモス, Bara Manmosu; 35): A gigantic mammoth-themed robot. First monster to be summoned by Bomber the Great. Killed by Oh Blocker.
- Bara Skunk (バラスカンク, Bara Sukanku; 36): A skunk-themed robot who works for Bomber the Great in creating a new Baranoia. Refer to himself as the most feared Machine Beast in the universe. He produces gas from his tail and mouth after eating garbage. This gas is so intense that instantly breaks down any material to its atomic level. Killed by OhBlocker (with the help of Tackle Boy).
- Bara Police (バラポリス, Bara Porisu; 37 & 38): A police officer-themed robot in police car-themed armor. Disguising himself as a police chief, he had numerous police officers under his control. Killed by Gunmajin and OhBlocker.
- Bara Gold (バラゴールド, Bara Gōrudo; 39 & 40): A golden retriever-themed robot. Last monster used by Bomber the Great. Turned anything into gold, and as it did so, it grew in size. Among things he turned into gold are OhGreen's legs and arms, as well as several parts of Blue Blocker, Pink Blocker, Yellow Blocker and Red Blocker. Everything turned to gold returned to normal after Red Puncher destroyed Bara Gold's device. Killed by King Pyramider Battle Formation.
- Bara Hunter (バラハンター, Bara Hantā; 42): A robotic hunter/hose-themed monster that could blast lasers from its shoulder-protruding cannon. Killed by King Pyramider Battle Formation (OhBlocker).
- Bara Fraud (バラペテン, Bara Peten; 43): A robotic vagabond/peddler monster that could blast lasers from the cannon on its forehead. Killed by Oh Blocker (with the help of Tackle Boy).
- Bara Guard (バラガード, Bara Gādo; 44): At first disguised himself as a dog as part of a trap. His true form is a steam locomotive-themed robot monster that wielded a large bazooka-like weapon in battle. This robot could blast lasers and was very strong. Although he survives OhBlocker and Tackle Boy's attack, Bara Guard is killed by Gunmajin.
- Bara Micron (バラミクロン, Bara Mikuron; 45 & 46): A worm-like monster that used a "divide-and-conquer" tactic, breaking its body by its sphere-like segments which each had their own method of attack on its enemies. Could spray a beam of small dark particles to make any machine have a mind of its own, including Red Puncher and Oh Blocker, and taking away the Ohrangers' henshin powers (including King Ranger's). Killed by energy summoned by Dorin (that sent the Ohrangers in King Pyramider elsewhere) in the shape of a pyramid.
- Bara Gear (バラハグルマ, Bara Haguruma; Ohranger vs. Kakuranger): Used by Bacchushund in the bet he made with his son. Bara Gear is capable of placing his "Super Gears" on any machine to take it over as well as powering-up the Barlo Soldiers. He also briefly piloted Ohranger Robo after placing a gear in it. Can also attack with "Gear Bombs". He was later combined with Onbu-Bake to form Onbu-Gear (オンブハグルマ, Onbuhaguruma) through their Super Machine Youkai Fusion (超マシン妖怪合体, Chō Mashin Yōkai Gattai), who was killed by Ohranger Robo, Red Puncher and Oh Blocker with Tackle Boy.
- Bara Mobile (バラモビル, Bara Mobiru; Carranger vs. Ohranger): A car-themed robot who is the last of the Baranoians. He intended to enlist the aid of the Bowzock to establish his own empire of "car-people". Originally aided by the Carrangers (or specifically Kyousuke Jinnai/Red Racer) due to confusion between the teams, he soon kidnapped Goro to make him the first of his "car-people" only to be thwarted by the Carranger and Ohranger. He was able to enlarge himself without the aid of Acha and Kocha. Killed by Ohranger Robo.

== Episodes ==
No.	Title	Directed by	Written by	Original release date
1	"Invasion!! 1999"; Transliteration: "Shūrai!! Ichi Kyū Kyū Kyū" (Japanese: 襲来！！1999)	Shohei Tojo	Noboru Sugimura	March 3, 1995
2	"Assemble!! Chouriki Sentai"; Transliteration: "Shūketsu!! Chōriki Sentai" (Japanese: 集結！！超力戦隊)	Shohei Tojo	Noboru Sugimura	March 10, 1995
3	"Crisis: The Secret of Chouriki"; Transliteration: "Kiki!! Chōriki no Himitsu" (Japanese: 危機！！超力の秘密)	Masato Tsujino	Noboru Sugimura	March 17, 1995
4	"Bizarre!! Iron Man Papa"; Transliteration: "Kaiki!! Tetsujin Papa" (Japanese: 怪奇！！鉄人パパ)	Masato Tsujino	Noboru Sugimura	March 24, 1995
5	"Fierce Love!! The Burning Brothers"; Transliteration: "Geki Ai!! Honō no Kyōdai" (Japanese: 激愛！！炎の兄弟)	Takeshi Ogasawara	Toshiki Inoue	March 31, 1995
6	"Formidable Foe: A Thinking Machine"; Transliteration: "Kyōteki Zunō Mashin" (Japanese: 強敵 頭脳マシン)	Takeshi Ogasawara	Noboru Sugimura	April 7, 1995
7	"Complete!! The Chouriki Robo"; Transliteration: "Kansei!! Chōriki Robo" (Japanese: 完成！！超力ロボ)	Shohei Tojo	Noboru Sugimura	April 14, 1995
8	"Clash!! A Super Giant Battle"; Transliteration: "Gekitotsu!! Chō Kyodai Sen" (Japanese: 激突！！超巨大戦)	Shohei Tojo	Noboru Sugimura	April 21, 1995
9	"Suddenly!! A Traitor"; Transliteration: "Totsuzen!! Uragirimono" (Japanese: 突然！！裏切り者)	Masato Tsujino	Toshiki Inoue	April 28, 1995
10	"Here I Am, I'm a Burglar"; Transliteration: "Sanjō!! Dorobō Dayon" (Japanese: 参上！！泥棒だヨン)	Masato Tsujino	Shozo Uehara	May 5, 1995
11	"Submit: The Refrigerator of Love"; Transliteration: "Fukujū!! Ai no Reizōko" (Japanese: 服従！！愛の冷蔵庫)	Takeshi Ogasawara	Hirohisa Soda	May 12, 1995
12	"Explosion!! A Baby"; Transliteration: "Bakuhatsu!! Akachan" (Japanese: 爆発!!赤ちゃん)	Takeshi Ogasawara	Noboru Sugimura	May 19, 1995
13	"Illusion: The Dog of the Gods"; Transliteration: "Gensō!! Kamisama no Inu" (Japanese: 幻想！！神様の犬)	Shohei Tojo	Susumu Takaku	May 26, 1995
14	"I Love Pinocchio"; Transliteration: "Daisuki Pinokio" (Japanese: 大好きピノキオ)	Shohei Tojo	Shozo Uehara	June 2, 1995
15	"My Friend, Rest in Passion!!"; Transliteration: "Tomo yo!! Atsuku Nemure" (Japanese: 友よ！！熱く眠れ！！)	Hiroshi Butsuda	Toshiki Inoue	June 9, 1995
16	"Naughty!! The Future Child"; Transliteration: "Wanpaku!! Miraikko" (Japanese: 腕白！！未来っ子)	Hiroshi Butsuda	Hirohisa Soda	June 16, 1995
17	"The Stolen Transformation Brace"; Transliteration: "Gōdatsu!! Henshin Buresu" (Japanese: 強奪！！変身ブレス)	Masato Tsujino	Noboru Sugimura	June 23, 1995
18	"Dad's Unusual Love"; Transliteration: "Chichi no Ijō na Aijō" (Japanese: 父の異常な愛情)	Masato Tsujino	Noboru Sugimura	June 30, 1995
19	"The New Robo's Red Impact"; Transliteration: "Shin Robo Akai Shōgeki" (Japanese: 新ロボ赤い衝撃)	Takeshi Ogasawara	Hirohisa Soda	July 7, 1995
20	"Iron Fist 100 Bursts!!"; Transliteration: "Tekken Hyaku Renpatsu" (Japanese: 鉄拳100連発)	Takeshi Ogasawara	Hirohisa Soda	July 14, 1995
21	"The Storm-Calling Kendama"; Transliteration: "Arashi o Yobu Kendama" (Japanese: 嵐を呼ぶケン玉)	Shohei Tojo	Hirohisa Soda	July 21, 1995
22	"The Classified Combination Order!!"; Transliteration: "Gattai Maruhi Shirei!!" (Japanese: 合体㊙指令！！)	Shohei Tojo	Hirohisa Soda	July 28, 1995
23	"The Final Swimsuit..."; Transliteration: "Saigo no Mizugi..." (Japanese: 最後の水着…)	Masato Tsujino	Toshiki Inoue	August 4, 1995
24	"The Laughing Nostalgic Man!!"; Transliteration: "Warau Natsukashi Otoko!!" (Japanese: 笑う懐かし男！！)	Masato Tsujino	Susumu Takaku	August 11, 1995
25	"The Festival One-Shot Contest"; Transliteration: "Omatsuri Ippatsu Shōbu" (Japanese: お祭り一発勝負)	Masato Tsujino	Shozo Uehara	August 18, 1995
26	"The 600-Million-Year-Old Boy Warrior"; Transliteration: "Roku Oku Sai Shōnen Senshi" (Japanese: 6億歳少年戦士)	Yoshiaki Kobayashi	Noboru Sugimura	August 25, 1995
27	"King's Gallant Debut"; Transliteration: "Kingu Sassō Tōjō" (Japanese: キング颯爽登場)	Yoshiaki Kobayashi	Noboru Sugimura	September 1, 1995
28	"Behold, the Miracle Fortress"; Transliteration: "Miyo Kiseki no Yōsai" (Japanese: 見よ奇跡の要塞)	Takeshi Ogasawara	Noboru Sugimura	September 8, 1995
29	"Dance! The Invasion Cram School!!"; Transliteration: "Odoru! Shinryaku-juku!!" (Japanese: 踊る!侵略塾！！)	Takeshi Ogasawara	Shozo Uehara	September 22, 1995
30	"The Earth's Sleeping Like a Log"; Transliteration: "Chikyū ga Gūsuka" (Japanese: 地球がグースカ)	Shohei Tojo	Shozo Uehara	September 29, 1995
31	"Home Delivery Diet"; Transliteration: "Takuhai Daietto" (Japanese: 宅配ダイエット)	Shohei Tojo	Shozo Uehara	October 13, 1995
32	"The Terrifying School Nightmare"; Transliteration: "Gakkō no Kowai Akumu" (Japanese: 学校の怖い悪夢)	Takao Nagaishi	Noboru Sugimura	October 20, 1995
33	"The Five Robos' Rampage"; Transliteration: "Go Dai Robo Ō-abare" (Japanese: 5大ロボ大暴れ)	Takao Nagaishi	Hirohisa Soda	October 27, 1995
34	"The Emperor's Final Challenge"; Transliteration: "Kōtei Saigo no Chōsen" (Japanese: 皇帝最後の挑戦)	Takao Nagaishi	Hirohisa Soda	November 3, 1995
35	"The Violently Explosive Jerk"; Transliteration: "Kageki na Bakudan Yarō" (Japanese: 過激な爆弾野郎)	Takeshi Ogasawara	Hirohisa Soda	November 10, 1995
36	"A Direct Hit With Flatulence!!"; Transliteration: "Onara ni Chokugeki!!" (Japanese: オナラに直撃！！)	Takeshi Ogasawara	Hirohisa Soda	November 17, 1995
37	"I am Gunmajin"; Transliteration: "Sessha Ganmajin" (Japanese: 拙者ガンマジン)	Takao Nagaishi	Noboru Sugimura	November 24, 1995
38	"It's Tough Being a Majin!"; Transliteration: "Majin wa Tsurai yo" (Japanese: 魔神はつらいよ)	Takao Nagaishi	Noboru Sugimura	December 1, 1995
39	"The Prince Dies in a Duel"; Transliteration: "Ōji Kettō ni Shisu" (Japanese: 皇子決闘に死す)	Ryuta Tasaki	Noboru Sugimura	December 8, 1995
40	"Arrival! The Mysterious Princess!!"; Transliteration: "Shutsugen! Nazo no Hime!" (Japanese: 出現！謎の姫！)	Takeshi Ogasawara	Noboru Sugimura	December 15, 1995
41	"The Dangerous Couple!!"; Transliteration: "Kiken na Futari!!" (Japanese: 危険なふたり！！)	Takeshi Ogasawara	Noboru Sugimura	December 22, 1995
42	"The Squadron's Public Execution!!"; Transliteration: "Sentai Kōkai Shokei!!" (Japanese: 戦隊公開処刑！！)	Takao Nagaishi	Hirohisa Soda	January 12, 1996
43	"The Trump Card is Seven Changes"; Transliteration: "Kirifuda wa Shichi Henge" (Japanese: 切り札は七変化)	Ryuta Tasaki	Shozo Uehara	January 19, 1996
44	"The Strongest Beauty on Earth"; Transliteration: "Chijō Saikyō no Bijo" (Japanese: 地上最強の美女)	Takao Nagaishi	Hirohisa Soda	January 26, 1996
45	"Destruction!! The Chouriki Base"; Transliteration: "Kaimetsu!! Chōriki Kichi" (Japanese: 壊滅！！超力基地)	Takeshi Ogasawara	Noboru Sugimura	February 2, 1996
46	"Earth's Final Day!!"; Transliteration: "Chikyū Saigo no Hi!!" (Japanese: 地球最期の日！！)	Takeshi Ogasawara	Noboru Sugimura	February 9, 1996
47	"Rise, Shine, Be Reborn!!"; Transliteration: "Tate Kagayake Yomigaere!!" (Japanese: 立て輝け蘇れ！！)	Takao Nagaishi	Noboru Sugimura	February 16, 1996
48 (Final)	"Love Heroes"; Transliteration: "Ai no Yūshatachi" (Japanese: 愛の勇者たち)	Takao Nagaishi	Noboru Sugimura	February 23, 1996

== Movie ==
The movie version of Chouriki Sentai Ohranger, was directed by Kobayashi Yoshiaki and written by Shōzō Uehara. It premiered in Japan on April 15, 1995, at Toei Super Hero Fair '95. It was originally shown as a triple feature alongside Mechanical Violator Hakaider and the feature film version of Juukou B-Fighter.

== Crossovers ==
- Chouriki Sentai Ohranger: Olé vs. Kakuranger (超力戦隊オーレンジャー オーレVSカクレンジャー, Chōriki Sentai Ōrenjā: Ōre tai Kakurenjā): A 1996 direct-to-video movie which depicts a crossover between Ohranger and Ninja Sentai Kakuranger and takes place between episodes 33 and 34 of Chouriki Sentai Ohranger.
- Gekisou Sentai Carranger vs. Ohranger (激走戦隊カーレンジャーVSオーレンジャー, Gekisō Sentai Kārenjā tai Ōrenjā): A 1997 direct-to-video crossover between Gekisou Sentai Carranger and Ohranger which takes place between episodes 38 and 39 of Gekisou Sentai Carranger.
- Ohsama Sentai King-Ohger in Space (王様戦隊キングオージャー IN SPACE, Ōsama Sentai Kinguōjā In Supēsu): The characters Riki and Dorin appear as two of the guest characters from Super Sentai series to appear in this web-exclusive crossover special starring the cast from Ohsama Sentai King-Ohger.

== Cast ==
- Goro Hoshino: Masaru Shishido (宍戸 勝, Shishido Masaru)
- Shouhei Yokkaichi: Kunio Masaoka (正岡 邦夫, Masaoka Kunio)
- Yuji Mita: Masashi Goda (合田 雅史, Gōda Masashi)
- Juri Nijou: Ayumi Asō (麻生 あゆみ, Asō Ayumi)
- Momo Maruo: Tamao Satō (さとう 珠緒, Satō Tamao)
- Riki: Shōji Yamaguchi (山口 将司, Yamaguchi Shōji), Takumi Hashimoto (橋本 巧, Hashimoto Takumi; Voice; 26–27), Shinta Takaiwa (高岩 芯泰, Takaiwa Shinta; King-Ohger in Space)
- Naoyuki Miura: Hiroshi Miyauchi (宮内 洋, Miyauchi Hiroshi)
- Dorin: Risa Wada (和田 理沙, Wada Risa), Arisa Sonohara (其原 有沙, Sonohara Arisa; King-Ohger in Space)
- Mikio: Yūki Satō (佐藤 侑輝, Satō Yūki)
- Ichiro Nitta (新田 一郎, Nitta Ichirō): Satoru Saito (斉藤 暁, Saitō Satoru)
- Satoko Nitta (新田 里子, Nitta Satoko): Reiko Mizuno (水野 令子, Mizuno Reiko)
- Kiyomi Nitta (新田 清美, Nitta Kiyomi): Saori Makishima (牧島 沙織, Makishima Saori)
- Yutaka Nitta (新田 豊, Nitta Yutaka): Shunsuke Ōba (大場 俊輔, Ōba Shunsuke)
- Kotaro Henna: Shoichiro Akaboshi (赤星 昇一郎, Akaboshi Shōichirō)

=== Voice cast ===
- Paku: Etsuko Kozakura (小桜 エツ子, Kozakura Etsuko)
- Gunmajin: Akira Kamiya (神谷 明, Kamiya Akira)
- Emperor Bacchushund: Tōru Ōhira (大平 透, Ōhira Tōru)
- Empress Hysteria: Minori Matsushima (松島 みのり, Matsushima Minori)
- Prince Buldont: Tomokazu Seki (関 智一, Seki Tomokazu)
- Princess Multiwa: Miho Yamada (山田 美穂, Yamada Miho), Hiromi Yuhara (湯原 弘美, Yuhara Hiromi; Human form)
- Bomber the Great: Nobuyuki Hiyama (檜山 修之, Hiyama Nobuyuki)
- Butler Acha: Kaneta Kimotsuki (肝付 兼太, Kimotsuki Kaneta)
- Butler Kocha: Shinobu Adachi (安達 忍, Adachi Shinobu)
- Camera Trick: Kazunori Arai (新井 一典, Arai Kazunori)
- Baro Soldiers: Tomoyuki Horita (堀田 智之, Horita Tomoyuki)
- Narrator: Nobuo Tanaka (田中 信夫, Tanaka Nobuo)

== Songs ==
Opening theme

- "Ole! Ohranger" (オーレ！オーレンジャー, Ōre! Ōrenjā)
  - Lyrics: Saburo Yatsude (八手 三郎, Yatsude Saburo)
  - Composition: Yasuo Kosugi (小杉 保夫, Kosugi Yasuo)
  - Arrangement: Ryō Yonemitsu (米光 亮, Yonemitsu Ryō)
  - Artist: Kentaro Hayami (速水 けんたろう, Hayami Kentarō)

Ending themes

- "Kinkyū Hasshin!! Ohranger" (緊急発進!! オーレンジャー, Kinkyū Hasshin!! Ōrenjā; "Emergency Take off!! Ohranger")
  - Lyrics: Saburo Yatsude
  - Composition: Yasuo Kosugi
  - Arrangement: Saburō Makino (まきの さぶろう, Makino Saburō)
  - Artist: Kentarō Hayami
  - Episodes: 1–47
- "Nijiiro Crystal Sky" (虹色クリスタルスカイ, Nijiiro Kurisutaru Sukai; "Rainbow Colored Crystal Sky")
  - Lyrics & Composition: Kyōko Kiya (木屋 響子, Kiya Kyōko) (as KYOKO)
  - Arrangement: Seiichi Kyōda (京田 誠一, Kyōda Seiichi)
  - Artist: Kentarō Hayami
  - Episodes: 48
