= Mio Kudo =

Japanese actress, entertainer and model (born 1999)

- Born: October 8, 1999 (age 26); Tokyo, Japan
- Occupations: Entertainer; model; actress
- Years active: 2009–present
- Agent: Platinum Production
- Height: 167 cm (5 ft 6 in)
- Website: Official profile

Mio Kudo (工藤 美桜, Kudō Mio; born October 8, 1999) is a Japanese actress, entertainer and model who is represented by Platinum Production. She is known for her roles as Kanon Fukami/Kamen Rider Kanon Specter in Kamen Rider Ghost (2015–2016) and Sayo Oharu/Kiramai Pink in Mashin Sentai Kiramager (2020–2021).

== Biography ==
Kudo started modeling when she was in fourth grade in elementary school.

She was part of Charm Kids as Mana Fujitani until August 1, 2012. On September 16, she announced that she would revert to her birth name.

== Works ==
=== Video ===
| Year | Title | Notes | Ref. |
|---|---|---|---|
| 2011 | Junior Idol Ring: Mana Fujitani Edition | | |

== Filmography ==
=== Television ===
| Year | Title | Role | Notes | Ref. |
|---|---|---|---|---|
| 2016 | Kamen Rider Ghost | Kanon Fukami | | |
| 2020 | Mashin Sentai Kiramager | Sayo Oharu/Kiramai Pink | | |
| 2021 | Tokyo MER: Mobile Emergency Room | Kozue Kiyokawa | | |
| 2022 | Rent-A-Girlfriend | Ruka Sarashina | | |
| 2022 | My Dearest Self with Malice Aforethought | Rin Hakubishi | | |
| 2023 | Trillion Game | Shiori | Episode 2 | |
| 2023 | Ao Haru Ride | Asumi Nitō | | |
| 2023 | Seasoned Connections | Sakura Suzushiro | | |
| 2025 | Call Me by No-Name | Megumi Yotsugi | Lead role | |

=== Film ===
| Year | Title | Role | Notes | Ref. |
|---|---|---|---|---|
| 2020 | Mashin Sentai Kiramager Episode Zero | Sayo Oharu/Kiramai Pink | | |
| 2020 | Bye Bye Vamp | Miki Satsuki | | |
| 2021 | Mashin Sentai Kiramager The Movie: Bebop Dream | Sayo Oharu/Kiramai Pink | | |
| 2021 | Mashin Sentai Kiramager vs Ryusoulger | Sayo Oharu/Kiramai Pink | | |
| 2022 | Kikai Sentai Zenkaiger vs Kiramager vs Senpaiger | Sayo Oharu/Kiramai Pink | | |
| 2023 | Maku wo Orosuna! | Monta | | |
| 2023 | Tokyo MER: Mobile Emergency Room – The Movie | Kozue Kiyokawa | | |
| 2024 | Honeko Akabane's Bodyguards | Kunugi Otaru | | |
| 2025 | Boy's Wish: We Can Use Magic Once in a Lifetime | | | |

=== Web series ===
| Year | Title | Role | Notes | Ref. |
|---|---|---|---|---|
| 2021 | Kamen Rider Specter x Blades | Kanon Fukami/Kamen Rider Kanon Specter | | |
| 2022 | Kamen Rider Jeanne and Aguilera with Girls Remix | Kanon Fukami | Episodes 2 and 3 | |
