= Platinum Production =

Japanese talent agency

Platinum Production Inc.
- Native name: 株式会社プラチナムプロダクション
- Romanized name: Kabushiki-gaisha purachinamu purodakushon
- Company type: Kabushiki gaisha
- Industry: Service industry (entertainment)
- Genre: Tarento, actors, actresses, musical artists, modelling, entertainment industry management
- Founded: December 2000; 25 years ago
- Headquarters: Yushin Main Building 9th Floor, 3-27-11, Shibuya, Tokyo 150-0002, Japan
- Area served: Japan
- Key people: Tsutomu Takizawa (Representative)
- Number of employees: 50 (November 2014)
- Subsidiaries: Platinum Passport Inc. PreciouStone Music Inc.
- Website: platinumproduction.jp

Platinum Production Inc. (株式会社プラチナムプロダクション, Kabushiki-gaisha purachinamu purodakushon) is a Japanese talent agency headquartered in Shibuya, Tokyo. It was founded in 2000 and focuses on talent management for tarento, models, actors and musical artists. The headquarters is currently situated on the ninth floor of the Yushin Main Building.

== Current notable talents ==
This is a list of Platinum Production and Platinum Passport artists that have articles on Wikipedia.

=== Female ===
- Yuko Ogura
- Nonoka Ono
- Miwako Kakei
- Rumiko Koyanagi
- Yui Sakuma
- Yuu Tejima
- Reiko Tokita
- Anne Nakamura
- Nanao
- Aki Higashihara
- Satomi Takasugi
- Rina Sawayama
- Sonmi
- Ena Fujita
- Aya Kiguchi
- Fuka Kakimoto
- Satomi Takasugi
- Shanadoo
- Kaba-chan
- Shiori Momota
- Mio Kudo
- Seira Anzai
- Enako
- Saki Akai
- Yuuka Suzuki

=== Male ===
- Toshiki Kashu
- Ken Kaneko
- Yoshihiko Hakamada
- Makoto Uehara
- Shinji Nakano
- Kohei Hirate
- Rio Komiya

=== Former ===
- Band-Maid
- Mayuko Iwasa
- Yukina Kinoshita
- Silent Siren
- Chinatsu Wakatsuki
- Passpo
- Reina Triendl
- Predia
- Yuzuki Aikawa
