= Shiori Momota =

Japanese gravure idol (born 2007)

- 百田 汐里
- Born: 19 August 2007 (age 18); Osaka Prefecture
- Occupation: Gravure idol
- Agent: Platinum Production
- Style: Idol
- Height: 168 cm (5 ft 6 in)
- Website: Official profile

Shiori Momota (百田 汐里, Momota Shiori; born 19 August 2007, in Osaka Prefecture) is a Japanese gravure idol. She is represented by Platinum Production.

She was selected as a member of the 2024 Seifuku Collection.

Since 2024, She has been a member of the Krush Girls (ring girls of Krush).

== Career ==
=== Photo albums ===
| Date | Title | Publisher | Ref. |
|---|---|---|---|
| 21 Nov 2024 | Miracle Girl | Shueisha | |
| 6 Jun 2025 | Prologue | Wani Books | |

=== Magazines ===
| Run | Title | Ref. |
|---|---|---|
| 2024 – | Weekly Young Jump | |

=== Web television programmes ===
| Run | Title | Website | Ref. |
|---|---|---|---|
| 3 Apr – 1 May 2023 | Kyou, suki ni narimashita. | Abema | |
