= Rina Sawayama (model) =

Japanese female fashion model, tarento, and professional figure skater (born 1988)

- 澤山 璃奈
- Born: 13 October 1988 (age 37); Yokohama, Kanagawa Prefecture, Japan
- Other name: Rina (璃奈)
- Occupations: Model; tarento; figure skater
- Years active: 2006–
- Known for: 2007: Toray Swimsuit Campaign Girl; 2010–15: Joined Horipro; 2015: Transferred from her former agency
- Modeling information
- Agency: Platinum Production

Rina Sawayama
Personal information
- Native name: 澤山 璃奈

Figure skating career
- Country: Japan
- Partner: Taiyo Mizutani (former)
- Skating club: Hosei University Sports Day Skating Section

Rina Sawayama (澤山 璃奈, Sawayama Rina; born 13 October 1988, in Yokohama, Kanagawa Prefecture) is a Japanese professional figure skater, dancer, actress, gravure idol, TV personality.

== Personal life and career ==
Sawayama took on skating when she was in the third year of primary school.

While in high school, she won the Japan Junior Figure Skating Championships in ice dance three times – in the 2004/2005, 2005/2006 and 2006/2007 seasons.

As of 2007, she already appeared on variety shows and had modelled for magazines.

In 2011, she graduated from Hosei University with a bachelor's degree in literature.

Later in that year, she joined Prince Hotel as a professional figure skater.

As of 2015–2022, she was represented by the Platinum Production talent agency for her tarento activities.

On 13 October 2021, Sawayama announced through her Twitter and Instagram accounts that she had married earlier on that day, which was her 33rd birthday.

== Competitive highlights ==
Ice dance, with Taiyo Mizutani

Event	04–05	05–06	06–07
National
Japan Junior Figure Skating Championships	1st	1st	1st

== Works ==
=== Videos ===
Date	Title	Publisher
25 Jul 2008	Waltz for Rina	Liverpool
25 Jul 2011	Reenus	Wani Books
23 Mar 2012	Fairena	Takeshobo
23 Mar 2012	Loverena	Takeshobo
26 Oct 2012	Rina Kaze	E-Net Frontier
20 Dec 2012	Rina Sora	E-Net Frontier

== Filmography ==
=== TV programmes ===
Dates	Title	Network	Notes	Ref.
Apr 2007 – May 2008	Oha Suta	TX	Monday regular	
Dec 2009 –	Bebop! High Heel!	ABC	Quasi-regular	
26 Mar 2010	Omoikkiri Don!	NTV	She made regular appearances before	
Apr 2010 – Mar 2011	Pon!	NTV	Mondays and Thursday; in charge of weather; Friday relay corner in charge	
	That's Takarakuji	TBS	Immediately after the end of the live infomercial broadcast of Akko ni omakase!	

==== Guest appearances ====
Dates	Title	Network
	Figure no Shin sekai! Shūzō Kangeki: Rina Gōkyū: Korega Kiseki no Butaiurada!	TBS
14 Jan, 25 Feb 2007	Junk Sports	CX
11 Apr, 11 Jun, 4 Jul 2007	Baribari Value	MBS

=== TV dramas ===
Dates	Title	Role	Network	Production	Ref.
Oct–Dec 2011	Welcome to the El-Palacio	Mariko Tanahashi	TX		
25 Dec 2013	TV Aichi 30th Anniversary Commemorative Work Skate Kutsu no Yakusoku: Nagoya Joshi Figure Monogatari	TVA	TX		

==== Advertisements ====
Product	Advert
Daihatsu Move	"Cornering"

=== Radio ===
Dates	Title	Network	Notes
	Terry Ito notteke Radio	NBS	
	Tsutomu Iwamoto no maido Sports	NCB	
	Recommen	NCB	
	Commen Real Voice	NCB	
Apr–Oct 2010	Ware-ra Imadoki'!: Dokodoki Shōhin Kenkyūjo	MBS Radio	Regular appearances
27 Apr 2013 – 12 Apr 2014	Ore-tachi Gocha maze'!: Atsumare Yanyan	MBS Radio	

=== Internet TV ===
GyaO

Title	Notes
Go! Go! GyaO	Official blog of interlocking programme
Tantei: Ran File	

== Bibliography ==
=== Magazines ===
Years	Title	Notes
2004–	Popteen	As a model
	Big Comic Spirits	Appeared 3 times on cover

=== Photo albums ===
Date	Title	Publisher	Photographer	ISBN
Apr 2007	IceDance Revolution	Shogakukan	Koki Nishida	ISBN 978-4-09-363711-4
5 Nov 2007	Happy=Sweet	Goma Books	Isamu Kurosa	ISBN 978-4-7771-0800-8
25 May 2011	R22	Wani Books	TakeoDec.	ISBN 978-4-8470-4377-2
28 Sep 2012	I Believe	Kodansha	Yoshihisa Marutani	ISBN 978-4-0621-8009-2

=== Other publications ===
Title	Ref.
Rina Sawayama Trading Card All 178 Types	

=== Events, stills ===
Dates	Title	Location	Notes	Ref.
	SoyJoy × Takashimaya	JR Tokai Takashimaya		
	French Film Festival 2007 "Affectionate Avanture" Stage greetings	Toho Cinemas Roppongi Hills		
	Aero skating rink	Marunouchi Building		
	Volvic		Infomercial	
	Nike		Poster	
7–14 Aug 2016	Pikachu Mass Production Chu! –You Get Wet Now???–	Minato Mirai 21		
