= Toritsu Mizusho! =

Japanese manga series

- The School of Water Business

都立水商! (Toritsu Mizusho!)
- Manga
- Written by: Hikaru Murozumi
- Illustrated by: Shinobu Inokuma
- Published by: Shogakukan
- Magazine: Weekly Young Sunday
- Original run: 2003 – 2009
- Volumes: 22
- Live-action television film
- Original network: Nippon TV
- Released: March 28, 2006

The School of Water Business (都立水商!, Toritsu Mizusho!) is a manga series created by Shinobu Inokuma, the author of Salad Days. It is based on a novel by Hikaru Murozumi, and is set in a fictional trade-school—that focuses on the mizu shōbai—located in the Kabukichō district of Shinjuku, Tokyo.

The school's focus is to give students their last chance in the school system. Classes are divided into occupations such as hostesses, hosts, "managers" (from waiters to actual managers), "geibaa" ("gay bar" but is a more comedic view of males dressing and acting like females) and, finally, "soapgirls".

The series has a sequel, Toritsu Mizusho! 2, with one volume published as of March 2012. Oda Mari, now a teacher at the high school, replaces Keisuke Tanabe as the focus character.

== Characters ==
The volume number denotes the character's first appearance. The actor/actress is the person that was cast for the character in the TV special.

- Keisuke Tanabe (田辺 圭介, Tanabe Keisuke; played by: Takashi Fujii): Sociology teacher (vol. 1)
- Akane Yoshioka (吉岡 あかね, Yoshioka Akane): Fuzoku Course Director (vol. 1)
- Shigeo Yagura (矢倉 茂, Yagura Shigeo; played by: Naoto Takenaka): Headmaster (vol. 1)
- Toshihito Takei (竹井 俊仁, Takei Toshihito): Host Course Director (vol. 1)
- Makoto Ono (大野誠, Ōno Makoto; played by: Takaya Yamauchi): Gay Bar Course Director (vol. 1)
- Tadao Kurosawa (黒沢 忠夫, Kurosawa Tadao; played by: Hironobu Nomura): Manager Course Director (vol. 1)
- Michiko Yazawa (矢沢 道子, Yazawa Michiko): Music teacher (vol. 6)
- Mari Oda (小田 真理, Oda Mari; played by: Saki Seto) (Mari Koyama in TV version): Fuzoku Course student (vol. 1)
- Daichi Nagasawa (長沢 大地, Nagasawa Daichi; played by: Ryoji Morimoto): Manager Course student (vol. 1)
- Masashi Ito (伊東 雅史, Itō Masashi): Athletics Director (vol. 1)
- Izumi Eto (江藤 いずみ, Etō Izumi): Fuzoku Course student (vol. 1)
- Kikuzo Sakuma (佐久間 菊蔵, Sakuma Kikuzō; played by: Renji Ishibashi): Chairman of the Tokyo Metropolitan School Board (vol. 1)
- Teppei Suga (須賀 鉄平, Suga Teppei): Gay Bar Course student (vol. 1)
- Ryoko Akagi (赤木 良子, Akagi Ryōko): Fuzoku Course student (vol. 3)
- Mayuko Maruyama (丸山 真由子, Maruyama Maruko; played by: Misako Yasuda): Hostess Course student (vol. 4)
- Sawa Sugabayashi (杉林 佐和, Sugabayashi Sawa): Manager Course student (vol. 5)
- Sanae Yamashita (山下早苗, Yamashita Sanae; played by: Becky): Hostess Course student (vol. 6)
- Reira Yamaguchi (played by: Risa Kudo): Hostess Course student (vol. 8)
- Miwa Nagasawa (長沢 三葉, Nagasawa Miwa): Hostess Course student (vol. 9)
- Ayame Hanao (花尾 あやめ, Hanao Ayame): Hostess Course student (vol. 9)
- Komachi Nakajima (中嶋 小町, Nakajima Komachi): Hostess Course student (vol. 11)
- Etsuko Yamaguchi (TV only; played by: Mariko Tsutsui)
- Moe Akiba (TV only; played by: Aki Hoshino)
- Kyoto (TV only; played by: Kenji Anan)
