= Shōjo Hikō =

"Shōjo Hikō (少女飛行)"

Single by Passpo

from the album Check-In
- Released: May 4, 2011
- Recorded: 2011
- Genre: J-pop
- Label: Universal J

Passpo singles chronology
"DEPARTURE" (2010)	"Shōjo Hikō (少女飛行)" (2011)

"Shōjo Hikō" (少女飛行) is the 1st major single by the Japanese idol group PASSPO☆, released on May 4, 2011 on the Universal J label.

== Background ==
PASSPO☆'s first single on a major label (Universal J) used as their major debut after their indie phase. The song marks the biggest drop of any single, on the Oricon chart, in history. It dropped from 1st place in its first week to 102nd in its 2nd week.

== CD single ==
=== Track listing ===
CD
No.	Title	Length
1.	"Shōjo Hikō (少女飛行; Girl Aviation)"	3:35
2.	"Uhae (ウハエ)"	3:42
3.	"Shōjo Hikō (Off VOCAL ver.)"	3:35

=== First Press Bonuses ===
==== Limited K ====
- Handshake event ticket

==== All Limited Versions ====
- Random member photo

== Charts ==
Chart (2011)	Peak position
Japan (Oricon Daily Singles Chart)	1
Japan (Oricon Weekly Singles Chart)	1
