= Tamao Satō =

Japanese actress

- さとう珠緒
- Born: 佐藤 珠緒 (Satō Tamao); January 2, 1973 (age 53); Funabashi, Chiba, Japan
- Occupations: Actress; voice actress; television personality; model
- Years active: 1988–present
- Agents: Petit Smile; Lighthouse Productions

Tamao Satō (さとう 珠緒, Satō Tamao; born 2 January 1973) is a Japanese actress, voice actress, television personality and model from Funabashi, Chiba, perhaps best known for her role as Momo Maruo in the 1995 Super Sentai series Chōriki Sentai Ohranger, as well as co-hosting O-Sama Brunch, a Tokyo Broadcasting System Saturday morning show. She is affiliated with Petite Smile talent agency.

== Filmography ==
=== Film ===
- Okaeri no Yu (2026)

=== Television ===
- Call Me by No-Name (2025), Sora Hashidate

=== Video games ===
- The King of Fighters '96 (1996), Athena Asamiya
