= Call Me by No-Name =

2025 Japanese television series

- Genre: Romance; Psychological; Girls' love
- Based on: Call Me by No Name by Yuki Shasendo
- Written by: Miki Matsugasako
- Directed by: Yūka Eda
- Starring: Mio Kudo; Ichika Osaki
- Country of origin: Japan
- Original language: Japanese
- No. of episodes: 8

Original release
- Network: MBS
- Release: January 10 – February 28, 2025

Call Me by No-Name (コールミー・バイ・ノーネーム, Kooru Mii Bai Noo Neemu) is a Japanese romance television series based on the novel of the same name by Yuki Shasendo. The series was aired on Mainichi Broadcasting System's Dramaphile slot from January 10, to February 28, 2025.

== Plot ==
Megumi Yotsugi, a student at Eichi University, encounters Kotoha Furuhashi, an enigmatic girl found abandoned at a junkyard. After being turned down when she offers friendship, Megumi discovers that Kotoha is using a fake name and agrees to an unusual wager: to be her girlfriend until she can uncover her real name.

== Characters ==
=== Main characters ===
Yotsugi Megumi
Portrayed by: Mio Kudo
Kotoha Furuhashi
Portrayed by: Ichika Osaki

=== Supporting characters ===
Yabata Tsukasa
Portrayed by: Tomo Nakai
Murayama Sanae
Portrayed by: Ui Mihara
Murata Manabu
Portrayed by: Ryo Hashimoto
Hashidate Sora
Portrayed by: Tamao Satō
Kotoha's mother
