= Passpo =

Japanese girl group

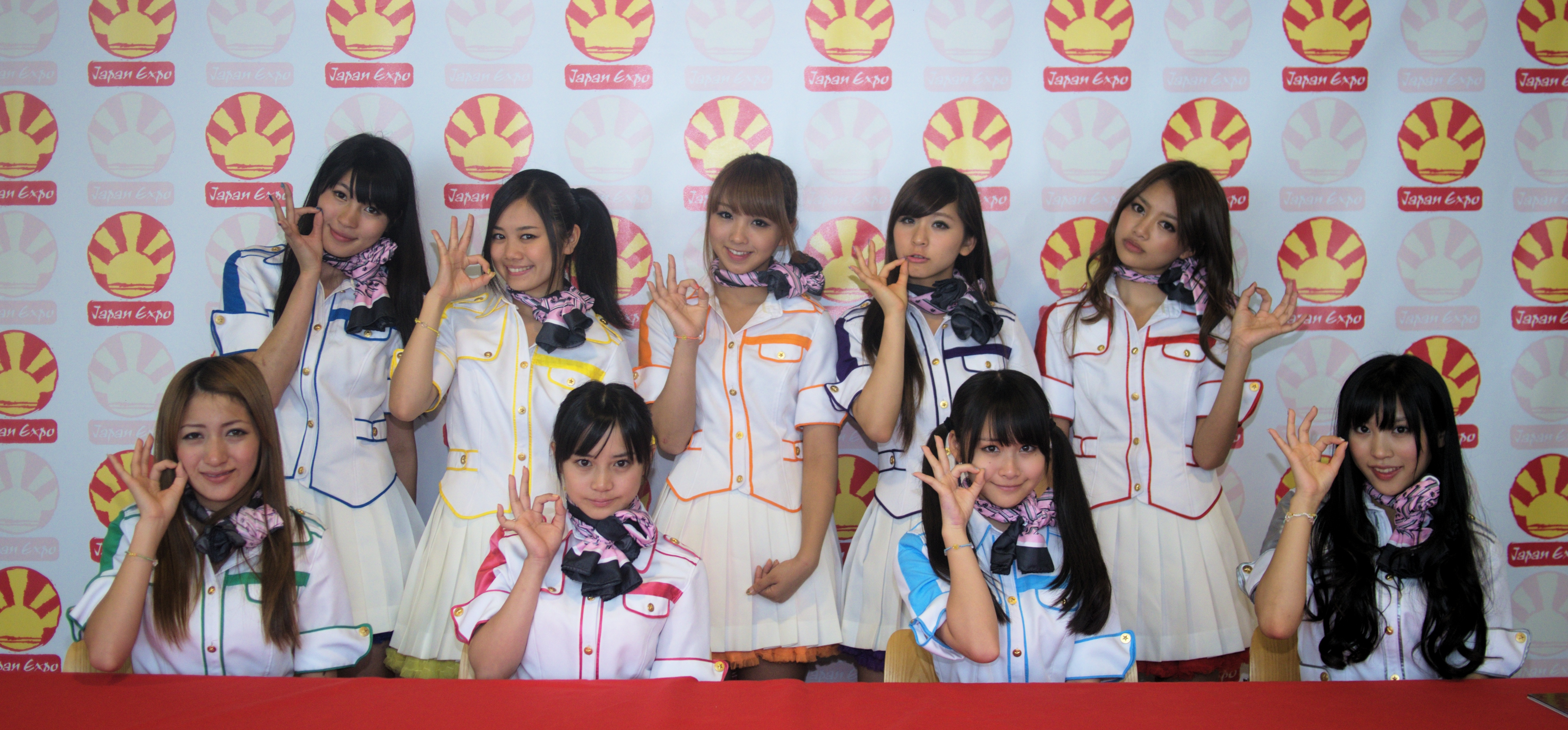
- Passpo during a press conference at Japan Expo in July 2011.

Background information
- Origin: Japan
- Genres: J-pop
- Years active: 2009–2018
- Labels: Platinum Passport (management); Jolly Roger (2010–2011); Universal J (2011–2015); Crown Records (2016–2018)
- Past members: Kaho Sakuma; Makoto Okunaka; Sako Makita; Ai Negishi; Yukimi Fujimoto; Natsumi Iwamura; Mio Masui; Shiori Mori; Naomi Anzai; Anna Tamai
- Website: www.passpo.jp

Passpo (ぱすぽ☆, Pasupo; word play for passport) was a Japanese girl group under Platinum Passport that was active from 2009 until 2018.

Passpo's first major single, "Shōjo Hikō", reached number 1 at the Oricon charts on May 16, 2011. On June 25, 2012, they took part in Yubi Matsuri, an idol festival produced by Rino Sashihara from AKB48. The concert happened at Nippon Budokan before a crowd of 8,000 people and featured other girl groups such as Idoling!!!, Shiritsu Ebisu Chugaku, Super Girls, Tokyo Girls' Style, Nogizaka46, Buono!, Momoiro Clover Z, and Watarirouka Hashiritai 7. Passpo disbanded on September 22, 2018.

== Members ==
- Ai Negishi (根岸愛, Negishi Ai)
- Yukimi Fujimoto (藤本有紀美, Fujimoto Yukimi)
- Natsumi Iwamura (岩村捺未, Iwamura Natsumi)
- Mio Masui (増井みお, Masui Mio)
- Shiori Mori (森詩織, Mori Shiori)
- Naomi Anzai (安斉奈緒美, Anzai Naomi)
- Anna Tamai (玉井杏奈, Anna Tamai)
- Kaho Sakuma (佐久間夏帆, Sakuma Kaho) (left on December 30, 2011)
- Makoto Okunaka (奥仲麻琴, Okunaka Makoto) (left on January 1, 2015)
- Sako Makita (槙田紗子, Makita Sako) (left on December 30, 2015)

== Discography ==
=== Singles ===
#	Title	Release date	Oricon Weekly Singles Chart	Sales (Oricon)		Album
#	Title	Release date	Oricon Weekly Singles Chart	First week	Total	Album
Independent (Jolly Roger)
1	"Let It Go!!"	March 31, 2010	129	1,000	1,002+	Take☆Off
2	"Hallelujah" (ハレルヤ, Hareruya)	July 14, 2010	98	1,000	1,100+	Take☆Off
3	"GPP (Girls Pajama Party)"	October 20, 2010	96	1,000	1,500+	Take☆Off
4	"Go On a Highway"	October 20, 2010	99	-	-	Take☆Off
5	"Pretty Lie"	October 20, 2010	94	-	-	Take☆Off
6	"Departure" (Mini-album)	December 15, 2010	-	-	-	Take☆Off
Major (Universal J)
1	"Shōjo Hikō" (少女飛行) (lit. 'Girl Flight')	May 4, 2011	1	42,706	43,534+	Check-In
2	"Vivi Natsu" (ViVi夏) (lit. 'Vivi Summer')	August 24, 2011	3	40,283	43,537+	Check-In
3	"Kimi wa Boku o Suki ni naru" (君は僕を好きになる) (lit. 'You will love me')	March 7, 2012	17	11,205	12,346+	One World
4	"Next Flight"	June 13, 2012	11	7,735	9,838+	One World
5	"Natsuzora Hanabi" (夏空HANABI) (lit. 'Summer Fireworks')	August 15, 2012	17	7,445	8,976+	One World
6	"Wing"	October 3, 2012	4	9,446	10,761+	One World
7	"Sakura Komachi"	February 13, 2013	6	15,531	19,909+	JEJEJEJET!!
8	"Step & Go"/"Candy Room"	May 22, 2013	14	13,169	17,883+	JEJEJEJET!!
9	"Truly"	June 26, 2013	7	12,042	16,769+	JEJEJEJET!!
10	"Mōsō no Hawaii" (妄想のハワイ) (lit. 'Imaginary Hawaii')	July 31, 2013	12	12,311	15,408+	JEJEJEJET!!
11	"Growing Up"	October 16, 2013	9	17,250	18,587+	JEJEJEJET!!
12	"Perfect Sky"	March 26, 2014	7	21,967	22,328+	TRACKS
13	"Himawari" (向日葵) lit. 'Sunflower')	August 20, 2014	7	24,796	25,450+	TRACKS
Major (Crown Records)
14	"Mr. Wednesday"	February 24, 2016	9	14,719	15,437+	Cinema Trip
15	"Bachelorette wa Owaranai" (バチェロレッテは終わらない, Bacherorette wa Owaranai; Bachelorette is Endless))	July 27, 2016	21	9,142	9,583+	Cinema Trip
16	"Gimme Gimme Action / Love Refrain"	November 23, 2016	23	6,351	6,351+	Cinema Trip
17	"Stand Up Girls! Dai 1-wa Dame-dame Kaijū ni Goyōjin" (すてんだっぷガールズ!〜第1話 ダメダメ怪獣にご用心〜, Sutando Appu Gāruzu! Dai 1-wa Dame-dame Kaijū ni Goyōjin; Stand Up Girls! Episode 1: Beware of the Useless Monster)	September 27, 2017	13	4,476	4,476+	

=== Albums ===
#	Title	Release date	Oricon Weekly Albums Chart	Sales (Oricon)	
#	Title	Release date	Oricon Weekly Albums Chart	First week	Total
Independent (Jolly Roger)
1	Take-off	December 8, 2010	168	1,000	1,000
Major (Universal J)
1	Check-in	December 7, 2011	14	9,597	9,597
2	One World	November 14, 2012	26	3,890	TBA
3	Je-Je-Je-Jet!!	December 11, 2013	14	6,346	7,000+
4	Tracks	December 10, 2014	6	12,300	14,000+
5	Pop Universal Music Years/Power Universal Music Years	December 2, 2015	6	N/A	N/A
Major (Crown Records)
6	Cinema Trip	February 15, 2017	20	3,541	N/A

=== DVDs ===
#	Title	Release date
1	Passpo Stage "Sakurairo" (ぱすぽ☆Stage『サクラ色』 (Pasupo Stage: Sakurairo, Passpo Stage: Cherry Blossom Colors)	May 3, 2010
2	Attention, please. DVD-Complete Box	August 25, 2011
3	Attention, please. Director's Cut Edition (アテンションプリーズ☆ディレクターズ・カット版, Atenshon, purīzu. Direkutāzu Katto-ban)	August 26, 2011
4	"Kiss-Suki" (キス-スキ, Kisu-Suki; Kiss-Like)	December 7, 2011
5	"Passpo Flight 2015"	March 25, 2015

== Books ==
=== Photobooks ===
- Cielo Passpo Official Photo Book (2010)

=== Others ===
- Passpo Official Book: Attention, please. Visual (ぱすぽ☆オフィシャルブック Attention Please ビジュアル編, Pasupo Ofisharu Bukku: Attension, please. Bijuaru-hen) (2011)
  - Passpo Official Book: Attention, please. Character (ぱすぽ☆オフィシャルブック ATTENTION PLEASE キャラクタｰ編, Pasupo Ofisharu Bukku Attention, please. Kyarakutā-hen) (2011)
