= Canal 21 (El Salvador) =

Salvadoran TV channel

- Country: El Salvador

Programming
- Picture format: 1080i HDTV (downscaled to 480i for the SDTV feed)

Ownership
- Owner: Grupo Megavisión

History
- Launched: 3 August 1993; 33 years ago

Links
- Website: Grupo Megavisión

Availability

Terrestrial
- Analog UHF: Channel 21

Canal 21 is a Salvadoran over-the-air television network and flagship of Grupo Megavisión. It started broadcasting in 1993.

== History ==
Canal 21 was founded on 3 March 1993 by Palestinian-Salvadoran businessman Oscar Antonio Safie.

At the time of launching, Canal 12's news department resigned all of its staff, causing Megavisión to seize the opportunity and launch Noticiero Megavisión on 31 October 1993. This caused the disappearance of TCS's monopoly in television news programs; it started with Argentine and Brazilian telenovelas, music videos, newscasts, etc.

Local programs as of 2014 included Diálogo (interviews), Telenoticias 21 (news), El Sótano (youth show) and Fanáticos + (sports talk show).
