= Sonmi =

Japanese model (born 1989)

- ソンミ
- Born: January 11, 1989 (age 37); Osaka Prefecture, Japan
- Occupation: Model
- Agent: Platinum Production
- Height: 1.7 m (5 ft 7 in) (2011)

Sonmi (ソンミ; born January 11, 1989, in Osaka Prefecture, Japan) is a Japanese model who is represented by Platinum Production.

== Biography ==
Sonmi is a South Korean resident in Japan. She is represented by Platinum Production.

Sonmi, with her father in Macau, was involved with gambling at the Cam Peck Casino, Kinpecki Amusement Park.

On 2012, she was selected, with Erika Kiyota, Rie Tanabe, and Maki Shima, as the image girl of Osaka Auto Messe.

== Filmography ==
=== TV series ===
Title	Network	Notes
School Kakumei!	NTV	
Dancing Sanma Palace	NTV	
18	MBS, TBS	
Sunday Japon	TBS	
Sonokao ga Mite Mitai	Fuji TV	
Waratte Iitomo!	Fuji TV	
Kaiketsu Emi Channel	KTV	

=== Modelling ===
Title	Notes
Maquia	
ChouChou Mook "Hone-kin Make"	
Monica Coppola Hair Show	
