= Super Keiba =

Japanese horse racing television show

Super Keiba (Note: Japanese: スーパー競馬, Hepburn: Sūpā Keiba; Super Horse Racing) was a Japanese horse racing television show that aired from 1987 to 2007.

BS Super Keiba, a new program currently broadcast by BS Fuji, was named after it.

== Cast ==
=== 2007 ===
==== Reporters ====
- Aki Higashihara
- Misako Yasuda
- Rica Imai

== Video games ==
I'MAX released two simulation video games for the Super Famicom based on the television show:

- Super Keiba (1993)
- Super Keiba 2 (1995)
