= Yuko Ogura =

Japanese gravure idol and model (born 1983)

- 小倉 優子
- Born: November 1, 1983 (age 41); Mobara, Chiba, Japan
- Occupations: Model; singer
- Spouse(s): Isao Kikuchi (m. 2011; div. 2017) Unknown (m. 2018; div. 2022)
- Children: 3
- Musical career
- Genres: Japanese pop
- Instrument: Vocals
- Years active: 2001–present
- Labels: King Records
- Website: www.starchild.co.jp

Yuko Ogura (小倉 優子, Ogura Yūko, born November 1, 1983) is a Japanese gravure idol and model who typically aimed for the cute, innocent schoolgirl look prior to her 2011 marriage. She is represented by Platinum Production.

== History ==
Ogura was born in Mobara, Chiba, and regularly, if not entirely seriously, claims to be one "Princess Apple-Momoka" (りんごももか姫) of the apple-shaped planet Korin. This is apparently an in-joke dating back to her middle school days. Having an alternate name was trendy at one point, and one of her friends told her that she looked like a Momoka. She liked the name and still uses it today.

She is known outside Japan for her song "Onna no Ko ♡ Otoko no Ko" (オンナのコ♡オトコのコ, "Girls ♡ Boys") which is the ending theme of the anime School Rumble. Ogura's fame as a model has also spread beyond Japan and she was named as one of the "7 most irresistibly cute Japanese idols" by the Thailand version of FHM magazine in 2010.

== Personal life ==
Ogura married hair and makeup artist Isao Kikuchi on October 10, 2011, in Oahu, Hawaii. In March 2017, Ogura announced that she and Kikuchi were divorcing. In December 2018 she had married for the second time. On July 27, 2022, Ogura announced that she divorced for the second time.
