= Aki Higashihara =

Japanese television personality and model

- Born: November 11, 1982 (age 43); Yokosuka, Japan
- Occupation: Television personalities

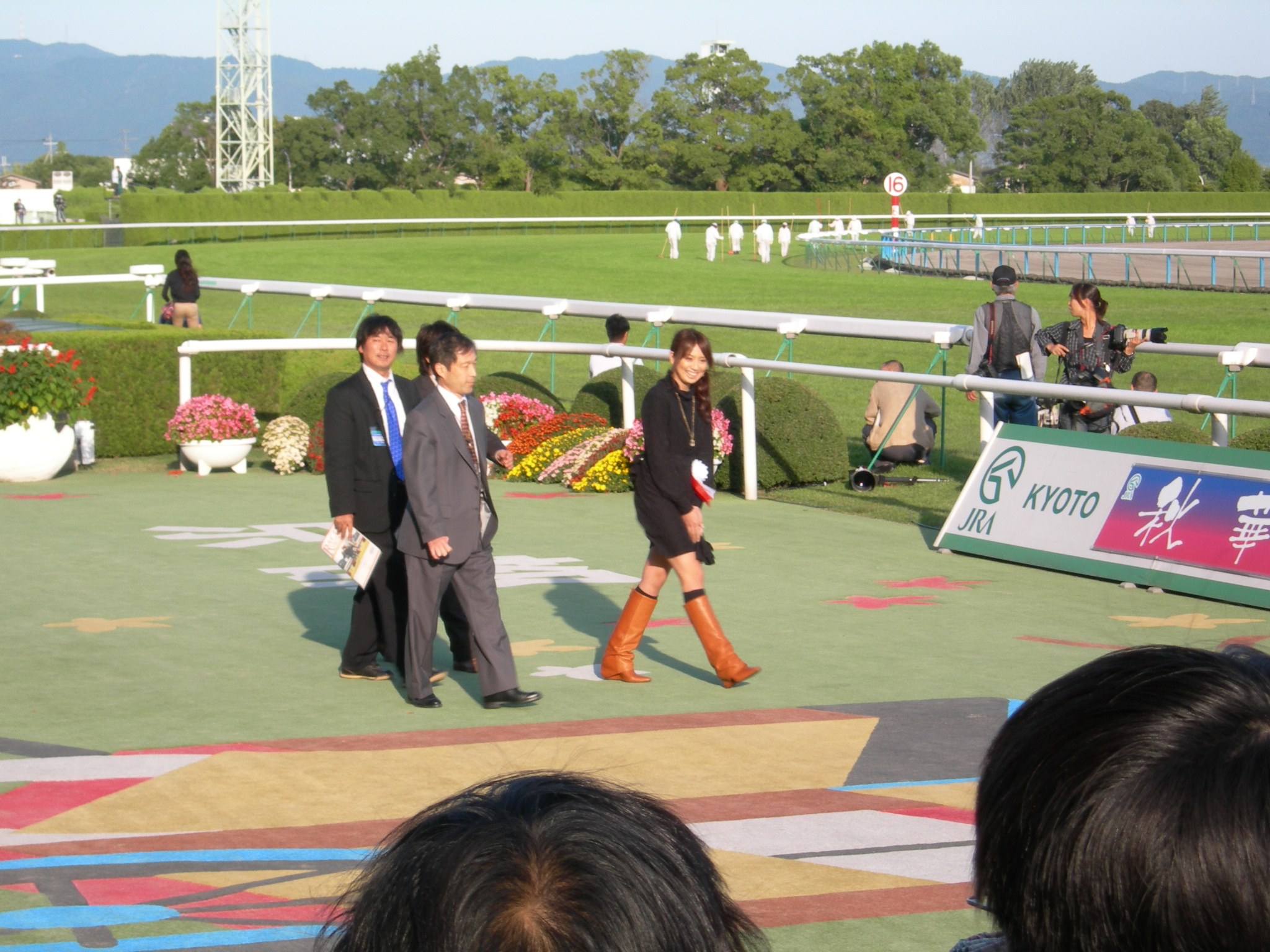
Aki "DEATH NOTE" Higashihara (Japanese talent and Model. Wife of Kosei Inoue) in Kyoto Racecourse.

Aki Higashihara (東原 亜希, Higashihara Aki; born November 11, 1982) is a Japanese television personality, fashion model and gravure idol. She married Judo athlete Kosei Inoue in 2008. She is represented by Platinum Production.

Higashihara also blogs, and a tongue-in-cheek internet meme holds that items which she blogs about are certain to suffer misfortune.

In 2007, she was one of the reporters on the Super Keiba TV show.
