= Misako Yasuda =

Japanese actress and former gravure idol (born 1982)

- 安田 美沙子
- Born: April 21, 1982 (age 43); Sapporo, Hokkaido, Japan
- Occupations: actor; gravure idol
- Years active: 2001–present
- Agent: Artist-house Pyramid
- Height: 1.61 m (5 ft 3 in) (2012)
- Spouse: Naoyuki Shimotori (m. 2014)
- Website: Official profile

Misako Yasuda (安田 美沙子, Yasuda Misako; born April 21, 1982 in Sapporo, Hokkaido, Japan) is a Japanese actress and former gravure idol who is represented by the talent agency, Artist-house Pyramid.

== Filmography ==
=== Variety ===
Regular

Year	Title	Network	Notes
2010	Shokunin no Men Kōbō	BS Asahi	
2012	Tokyo Brandnew Girls	TV Tokyo	
2012	Yasuda no Arukkata	CBC	

Quasi-regular

Year	Title	Network	Notes
2004	Akko ni Omakase!	TBS	
2010	Noro	NHK General	
	Ametōku!	TV Asahi	
	Chi-chin Puipui	MBS	

One-shot guest appearance

Year	Title	Network	Notes
2013	Otona no Yamaaruki: Jibun ni Deaeru Hyakumeizan	TV Asahi	
2013	Himano-yu	STV	

Former regular and quasi-regular

Year	Title	Network	Notes
2000	Uchimura Produce	TV Asahi	
2002	Shinasho	CBC	Quasi-regular
2003	Deji Yatai	TBS	
2003	Ohayō Asahi-desu	ABC	Trend reporter
2004	Shibusuta S.B.S.T	TV Tokyo	Tuesday regular
2004	Gekisō! GT	TV Tokyo	Regular
2005	Hana Taka Tengu	TBS	Quasi-regular
2005	Buchi Nuki	TV Tokyo	Friday regular
2005	Gekkō Ongaku-dan	TBS	
2005	Quiz! Hexagon II	Fuji TV	Occasional appearances
2007	Uma Nade: Uma to Nadeshiko	Fuji TV	Regular
2007	Super Keiba	Fuji TV	Regular
2007	Shin 3-kagetsu Topic Eikaiwa	NHK Educational	Moderator
2010	Impact	CBC	
2011	Uma Doki	KBS	
2011	Micha Eru!	CBC	

=== Drama ===
Year	Title	Role	Network	Notes
2002	Shio Calvi	Beautiful woman	Kanagawa	
2004	Ā Rikon-shiki		Fuji TV	
2005	Ichiban Kurai no wa Yoake Mae	Naoko	TV Tokyo	
2005	Jukunen Rikon	Yuki Tsuchida	TV Asahi	
2006	Isshūkan no Koi	Ai Saito	TBS	
2006	Rocket Boys	Ayako Tachibana	TV Tokyo	
2006	Seichō Matsumoto ke Mono-michi	Ai Ogasawara	TV Asahi	
2006	Toritsu Mizusho!	Mayuko Maruyama	NTV	
2006	The Cottage	Shiho Takamura	WOWOW	Lead role
2006	Hyōten	Yumi Kano	TV Asahi	
2007	Joshi-ana Itchokusen!	Yui Nakatake	TV Tokyo	
2008	Kyō wa Shibuya de 6-ji	Kana Mizuuchi	Fuji TV	
2008	Loss: Time: Life	Midori Ryomiya	Fuji TV	
2008	81diver	Rika Muguruma	Fuji TV	
2009	Ninkyō Helper	Satsuki Horii	Fuji TV	
2011	Honboshi: Shinri Tokusō Jiken-bo	Mai Mujo	TV Asahi	
2012	Carnation	Satoko Ohara	NHK	
2012	Dr. Kenji Morohashi	Kyoko Nishina	Fuji TV	
2013	Taberu Dake	Miwa Aida	TV Tokyo	
2014	Watashi no Kiraina Tantei	Keiji Miki	TV Asahi	
2014	Tetsuko no Sodate-kata	Sakura Igawa	Menu-tele	

=== Films ===
Year	Title	Role	Notes
2005	Luna-Heights	Madori Otsuki	Lead role
2006	The Cottage	Shiho Takamura	Lead role
2006	Luna-Heights 2	Madori Otsuki	Lead role
2007	Arakure Knight	Hinako Mitsui	
2009	April Bride	Hanako	
2014	Bay Blues: 25-sai to 364-nichi	Mikiko Takayama	
