= List of Japanese gravure idols =

List of Japanese glamour models

This is a list of gravure idols (グラビアアイドル, gurabia aidoru), who are glamour models in Japan that are generally more provocative than regular idols, though not to the point of posing nude.

== 21st century ==
=== A ===
- Yuzuki Aikawa (b. 1983)
- Rina Akiyama (b. 1985)
- Sayaka Ando (b. 1981)
- Hikaru Aoyama (b. 1993)
- Yui Aragaki (b. 1988) - later became an actress
- Haruka Ayase (b. 1985) - later became an actress
- Rina Aizawa (b. 1991)
- Nana Asakawa (b. 1999)
- Jun Amaki (b. 1995)

=== B ===
- Fumika Baba (b. 1995) later became an actress

=== C ===
- Rola Chen (b. 1987) - from China

=== D ===
- Leah Dizon (b. 1986) - non-Japanese, American-born

=== E ===
- Enako (b. 1994)
- Erina Kamiya (b. 1991)

=== F ===
- Aoi Fujino (1998-2026)
- Ena Fujita (b. 1990) - also a musician
- Kyoko Fukada (b. 1982) - also an actress
- Mina Fukui (b. 1984)

=== H ===
- Shōko Hamada
- Mikie Hara (b. 1987)
- Ourei Harada (b. 1986)
- Ikumi Hisamatsu (b. 1996)
- Marica Hase (b. 1981)
- Manami Hashimoto (b. 1984) - later became an actress
- Yuka Hirata (b. 1983) - later became an actress
- Saori Horii (b. 1984)
- Aki Hoshino (b. 1977)
- Natsumi Hirajima (b. 1992)

=== I ===
- Miri Ichika (b. 1999)
- Yui Ichikawa (b. 1986) - later became an actress
- Mio Imada (b. 1997) - later became an actress
- Maya Imamori (b. 2006) - later became an actress
- Waka Inoue (b. 1980)
- Saaya Irie (b. 1993, alias: Saaya)
- Anna Iriyama (b. 1995)
- Miku Ishida (b. 1988)

=== J ===
- Kei Jonishi (b. 1995)

=== K ===
- Reon Kadena (b. 1986, alias: Minamo Kusano) - later become a nude model
- Megumi Kagurazaka (b. 1981) later became an actress
- Asami Kai (b. 1987)
- Miwako Kakei (b. 1994)
- Moemi Katayama (b. 1990)
- Yukie Kawamura (b. 1986)
- Asuka Kawazu (b. 2000)
- Hina Kikuchi (b. 2004) - later became an actress
- Kii Kitano (b. 1991) - later became an actress
- Noriko Kijima (b. 1988)
- Hitomi Kitamura (b. 1985)
- Emi Kobayashi (b. 1983)
- Mao Kobayashi (b. 1992)
- Yumi Kobayashi (b. 1988)
- Michiko Koga (b. 1986) - later became a musician
- Eiko Koike (b. 1980) later became an actress
- Ayaka Komatsu (b. 1986)
- Yuka Kosaka (b. 1985)
- Asaka Kubo (b. 1979)
- Risa Kudo (b. 1983)
- Yoko Kumada (b. 1982)
- Chiaki Kyan (b. 1986)
- Mio Kudo (b. 1999)

=== M ===
- Jurina Matsui (b. 1997)
- Hatsune Matsushima
- Mami Matsuyama (b. 1988)
- Megumi (b. 1981) later became an actress
- Mikuru (b. 1988)
- Yoko Mitsuya (b. 1984)
- Sakura Miyawaki (b. 1998)
- Amisa Miyazaki (b. 2002)
- Nashiko Momotsuki (b. 1995), also an actress
- Chisato Morishita (b. 1981)
- Suzuka Morita (b. 1992)

=== N ===
- Nao Nagasawa (b. 1984)
- Mariya Nagao (b. 1994)
- Kana Nakada (b. 1994), also a professional mahjong player
- Shoko Nakagawa (b. 1985) later became a voice actress and singer
- Yukie Nakama (b. 1979) later became an actress
- Chise Nakamura (b. 1986)
- Shizuka Nakamura (b. 1988)
- Kasumi Nakane (b. 1982)
- Jun Natsukawa (b. 1980)
- Rio Natsume (b. 1985)
- Harumi Nemoto (b. 1980)

=== O ===
- Yuka Ogura (b. 1998) later became an actress
- Yuko Ogura (b. 1983)
- Anri Okita (b. 1986)
- Mariko Okubo
- Sakurako Okubo (b. 1998) also an actress
- Kazusa Okuyama (b. 1994)
- Miwa Oshiro (b. 1983)
- Aiko Otake (b. 1994)
- Nana Ozaki (b. 1982, alias: Akiko Aimoto)

=== P ===
- Phongchi (b. 1990) - Vietnamese descent

=== S ===
- Natsume Sano (b. 1985)
- Nozomi Sasaki (b. 1988) later became an actress
- Hinako Sano (b. 1994)
- Erika Sawajiri (b. 1986) later became an actress
- Rina Sawayama (b. 1993)
- Ayaka Sayama (b. 1993)
- Risa Shimamoto (b. 1987)
- Ai Shinozaki (b. 1992)
- Mina Shirakawa (b. 1987)
- Yukina Shirakawa (b. 1985)
- Yuriko Shiratori (b. 1983)
- Anri Sugihara (b. 1982)
- Yumi Sugimoto (b. 1989)
- Fumika Suzuki (b. 1974)
- Miru Shiroma (b. 1997)

=== T ===
- Chiaki Takahashi (b. 1977) - later became a voice actress
- Nozomi Takeuchi (b. 1980)
- Nonami Takizawa (b. 1985)
- Rio Teramoto (b. 2001) - also an actress
- Erika Toda (b. 1988) - later became an actress
- Azusa Togashi (b. 1990)
- Ami Tokito (b. 1987)
- Kana Tsugihara (b. 1986)
- Rena Takeda (b. 1997)
- Riho Takada (b. 1994)
- Yuna Taira (b. 1998)
- Toomi (b. 1999)

=== U ===
- Mizuho Uchida (b. 1989)
- Rio Uchida
- Miyu Uehara (1987–2011)
- Takako Uehara

=== Y ===
- Haruna Yabuki
- Erina Yamaguchi (b. 1985)
- Erika Yamakawa (b. 1982)
- Azusa Yamamoto (b. 1981)
- Saori Yamamoto (b. 1985)
- Mami Yamasaki (b. 1985)
- Nana Yanagisawa (b. 1987)
- Minase Yashiro (b. 1985)
- Yinling (Yínlíng Yán, b.1978) - Taiwanese chakuero model
- Sarii Yoshizawa (b. 1985) - Chakuero model
- Risa Yoshiki
- Ryoka Yuzuki (b. 1974) - later became a voice actress

== 20th century ==
- Yuko Aoki - 1990s
- Fumie Hosokawa - 1990s
- Agnes Lum - 1970s; Chinese-Hawaiian
- Miho Yabe - 1990s

== See also ==
- List of Japanese idols
- Bakunyū
