= Kiks Tyo =

Japanese fashion brand

- Type: Private
- Industry: Fashion
- Genre: Streetwear
- Founded: 2006; 20 years ago in Shibuya, Tokyo, Japan
- Founder: hobby:tech
- Headquarters: Tokyo, Japan
- Products: Clothing, shoes, accessories, watches
- Website: kikstyo.com

Kiks Tyo is a Japanese fashion brand founded by DJ, designer, photographer and streetwear/sneaker culture personality hobby:tech (Shinichi Izaki) in 2006.

Kiks Tyo specializes in men's lifestyle and streetwear, as well as accessories and footwear, operating via the brand's Kiks Tyo Head Shop store in Shibuya, Tokyo.

The company previously operated Kiks Tyo stores in Harajuku, Yokohama, Ikebukuro and Taipei.

== History ==
Kiks Tyo was launched in 2006 by hobby:tech. Prior to starting Kiks Tyo, hobby:tech was a partner in the Japanese creative collective and streetwear brand known as BROWNRATS (El. brown). In early 2006 he exited BROWNRATS to launch a clothing line of his own. The line would be based on one of his primary passions: sneakers.

By 2007 Kiks Tyo had opened its boutique store, the Kiks Tyo Head Shop, near Cat Street, the pedestrian strip that connects Tokyo's two youth fashion centers: Shibuya and Harajuku. The store initially offered Kiks Tyo's original clothing and accessories, Casio's line of G-Shock watches and a curation of collectable vintage sportswear, snapback caps and sneakers from brands like Nike, Air Jordan, Fila, Chalk Line, Cazal and Spike Lee's 40 Acres & A Mule - much of which was hard to find elsewhere in Japan at the time. At the same time Kiks Tyo opened its second retail store, html (hobby tasteful merchandise laboratory), in Ikebukuro, Tokyo. Kiks Tyo launched its first collection at these standalone stores in Tokyo and eventually via over 40 domestic boutique and specialty retailers throughout Japan and around the world.

== Design ==
Kiks Tyo originally gained recognition in the streetwear and fashion circles such as sneaker heads and hypebeasts for producing apparel that fused a love for sneakers, Japanese bikini idols, hip-hop and street culture into a unique design aesthetic. hobby:tech explained the ethos of Kiks Tyo as “joining [different] worlds that have never been fused with creative intent“, and as ‘okosama lunch’, the Japanese term describing kid's meals served at family-friendly restaurants in Japan.

Kiks Tyo is known primarily for its "Sneakers and Girls" aka Kiks Girls photo T-shirts, which pair the eroticism of bikini clad Japanese models and gravure idols with coveted, rare and collectable sneakers or elements of sneaker culture. Design elements of the sneakers, their lore, nostalgia, color schemes or branding are expressed graphically, thematically, or via the model's styling and poses. The brand's initial 2006–2008 run of Kiks Girls tees featured Japanese sex symbol Aki Hoshino and sparked a global streetwear and sneaker culture trend movement rarely seen at the time. The "Kiks Tyo x Aki Hoshino Tee" is considered by GQ as one of the classic items in the history of East Asian trends.

Kiks Tyo has often used the slogan "Community of the Sneaker Nuts, By Sneaker Nuts, For Sneaker Nuts” in the brand's design, graphics and marketing. The main inspirations behind Kiks Tyo designs come from sneakers and sneaker culture, and its graphics, textiles, colorways, construction and packaging are made to complement, match or coordinate with them.

== Collaborators ==
=== Brands ===
Kiks Tyo has produced collaborative clothing, accessories, watches and sneakers with many other notable brands including Casio, G-Shock, New Balance, Yonex, New Era, Champion, Kubrick, Technics, Black Flys, Momotaro Jeans, OBEY, Penfield, Elecom, Weekly Playboy, Crooked Tongues, Trainerspotter, akomplice, QUOLOMO, San Francisco Hat, Shoe Goo and Ebbets Field Flannels. The brand's triple name collaboration with New Balance and G-Shock, the G-Flash pack, includes the NB M574J GGG ‘Glitter Gold’, named one of the best limited edition New Balance 574 sneakers of all time by Sneaker Freaker magazine.

=== Models, gravure idols and actresses ===
Kiks Tyo frequently collaborates with popular Japanese models, gravure idols and actresses such as Aki Hoshino, Anne Nakamura, Anri Sugihara, Jun Amaki, Saaya Irie, Ren Ishikawa, Asuka Kishi, Alisa, Anna Hongo, Airi Furuta, Sayaka Nitori, Momoka Ishida, Aika Sawaguchi, Chiaki Kyan, Arisa Kimura, Fumina Suzuki, Leng Yein, ZZZNi, Risa Yukihira, Sayaka Tomaru, Yuno Ohara, Runa Toyoda, Rina Toeda, Mayuri Tatei, Rio Teramoto, Hikaru Aoyama, Ayaka Sayama, Kazusa Okuyama, Yuka Kuramochi, Kaori Hisamatsu, Yuka Ogura, Moka Hashimoto, Mia Valentine, Natsuka, Mai Nishida, Mio Kudo, Yuko Ishida, Anna Konno, Megu Aoyama, Marupi, Miyu Murashima, Airi Shimizu, Emma Jasmine, Kanami Takasaki, Nanami Asahi, Rima Nishizaki, Ayako Inokuchi, Kana Tsugihara, Misaki Nito, Reina Fuchiwaki, Mai Kyoso, Aya Kiguchi, Yuki Mamiya, Sayuki Matsumoto, Ichika Osaki, Arisa Komiya, Rina Hashimoto, Marie Sukegawa, Yuzuki Aikawa, Nene Shida, Paloma Esmeria, Shanadoo, Cyber Japan Dancers, Mariya Nagao, Yuu Tejima, Ayumi Takada, Kisumi Amau, Miku Kuwajima, Yuzuha Saeki, Rin Takahashi, Yoshino Chitose, Nanako Kurosaki, Cocoro Toyoshima, Ina Enohara and Yuzuha Hongo of NMB48. These collaborative designs are featured throughout Kiks Tyo collections, and are primarily seen on photo print T-shirts.

=== Characters, mascots and superheroes ===
Kiks Tyo collaborations also include popular characters, mascots and superheroes from Japanese and American entertainment companies such as Hello Kitty and Sanrio, Disney and Mickey Mouse, DC Comics and Batman, Warner Brothers and Bugs Bunny, Snoopy and Peanuts, Sesame Street, and Felix the Cat.

=== Musicians, artists, photographers, celebrities and athletes ===
The brand also has worked jointly with artists, photographers, celebrities and athletes including Pete Rock, Ricky Powell, Yasumasa Yonehara, Da Pump, Show Lo, Shohei Otomo, SBTG, Devilrobots, The Source Magazine's Andre LeRoy Davis and Muhammad Yone.

=== Video games ===
In 2012 Sega featured Kiks Tyo and its Kiks Tyo Head Shop in the PlayStation Portable (PSP) video game Kurohyō 2: Ryū ga Gotoku Ashura hen (Japanese: クロヒョウ2 龍が如く 阿修羅編; lit. "Black Panther 2: Like a Dragon Ashura Chapter"), a spin off of its action-adventure Yakuza video game franchise. The game introduced the ability to buy and change clothes freely according to a desired look. A streetwear outfit consisting of a Kiks Tyo branded t-shirt, logo hoodie, denim jeans and Air Force 1 style sneakers can be purchased and changed into. The clothing is visible on the protagonist, Tatsuya, when in story mode, on adventures, walking around town and in battle.

== "Sneaker Lover" photobook and DVD ==
On January 31, 2008, Kiks Tyo announced the release of "Sneaker Lover" a photo-book and gravure DVD project featuring popular Japanese bikini idol, model and actress Aki Hoshino and photographed/filmed by former Egg Magazine creative director, artist and celebrated Tokyo-based photographer, Yasumasa Yonehara. The photobooks were distributed to book stores, news stands and conbinis throughout Japan, and internationally via Kiks Tyo's international online store.

"Sneaker Lover," a project conceived and directed by hobby:tech, and published by Goma Books, would go on to become an infamous part of sneaker folklore and regarded as one of street fashion's strongest triple-name collaborations. It marked the first time its subject, Hoshino and its photographer, Yonehara would work together professionally. The result was 100+ full-color pages of erotic images and film footage, set in Hong Kong and Macau, and snapped in Yonehara's trademark lo-fi style.

In addition to the photobook and DVD, Kiks Tyo, Aki Hoshino and Yonehara collaborated on series of six limited edition "Sneaker Lover" photo print T-shirts and a Taiwan photo exhibition that displayed enlarged prints of photos from the book, Yonehara's Instax Cheki photos, sneakers and props used during the project's creation. The large-scale collaboration project climaxed with the opening of Kiks Tyo's own "Sneaker Lover" pop-up store at Tokyo's street fashion culture mecca, Laforet.

== Notable clients ==
Kendrick Lamar, Mac Miller, G-Dragon, MadeinTYO, Apl.de.ap of Black Eyed Peas, Tomohisa Yamashita, Band-Maid, The Stereotypes, Hidetoshi Nakata, Tetsurō Degawa, Airi Taira, Da Pump, Kyotaro Fujimoto, Show Lo, Sho Kimura and Asanoyama Hiroki have worn Kiks Tyo. Mac Miller named Kiks Tyo as one of his 11 favorite streetwear brands.
