= Sano (surname) =

Sano (Japanese: 佐野) is a Japanese surname. Notable people with the surname include:

- Fusako Sano, Japanese kidnapping victim
- Gaku Sano, (born 1992), Japanese actor
- Hayato Sano (born 1998) Japanese actor, and idol from M!LK
- Hidemasa Sano (born 1984), Japanese swimmer
- Hinako Sano (born 1994), Japanese actress
- Hiroyuki Sano, Japanese pole vaulter
- Junya Sano (born 1982), Japanese cyclist
- Kaishu Sano (佐野 海舟, born 2000), Japanese footballer
- Kazuhiro Sano (born 1956), Japanese film director
- Kazuma Sano (born 1989), Japanese actor
- Keita Sano (born 1994), Japanese baseball player
- Kimitoshi Sano (佐野 公俊, born 1982), Japanese basketball coach
- Konosuke Sano, Japanese long-distance runner
- Mari Sano (born 1968), Japanese artist
- Sano Masakoto (佐野 政言, 1757–1784), Japanese samurai
- Masayuki Sano (born 1919), Japanese fencer
- Miguel Angel Sano, Dominican baseball player
- Minoru Sano (figure skater) (born 1955), Japanese figure skater
- Minoru Sano (chef) (1951–2014), Japanese chef
- Mizuki Sano (born 1973), Japanese actor
- Motoharu Sano (born 1956), Japanese musician
- Nami Sano (1987–2023), Japanese manga artist
- Naoki Sano, Japanese wrestler
- Natsume Sano (born 1985), Japanese actress
- Nobuyoshi Sano (born 1969), Japanese musician
- Rihei Sano (1912–1992), Japanese footballer
- Roy I. Sano (born 1931), Japanese-American bishop
- Seki Sano (1905–1966) was a Japanese actor
- Shirō Sano (born 1955), Japanese actor
- Tadayoshi Sano (1889–1945), Japanese army officer
- Tomoaki Sano (born 1968), Japanese footballer
- Tony Sano, Japanese-American TV host
- Toru Sano (born 1963), Japanese footballer
- Tsubasa Sano (born 1994), Japanese footballer
- Tsuneha Sano (1871–1956), Japanese scout
- Tsunetami Sano (1822–1902), Japanese statesman
- Yōko Sano (1938–2010), Japanese writer
- Toshikazu Sano (1940–2000), Japanese football referee
- Yoshimune Sano (born 1979), Japanese basketball player
- Yuko Sano (born 1979), Japanese volleyball player
- Yumeka Sano (born 1985), Japanese sprinter
- Yuya Sano (born 1982), Japanese footballer
