= Shimamoto =

Shimamoto (written: 島本 or 嶋本) is a Japanese surname meaning one who is from the island. Notable people with the surname include:

- Kazuhiko Shimamoto (島本 和彦, born 1961), Japanese manga artist
- Mami Shimamoto (嶋本 麻美, born 1987), Japanese weightlifter
- Rio Shimamoto (島本 理生, born 1983), Japanese writer
- Risa Shimamoto (島本 里沙, born 1987), Japanese gravure idol
- Ryō Shimamoto (島本 亮, born 1980), Japanese shogi player
- Shozo Shimamoto (嶋本 昭三, born 1928), Japanese artist
- Sumi Shimamoto (島本 須美, born 1954), Japanese voice actress

== See also ==
- Shimamoto, Osaka, a town in Mishima District, Osaka Prefecture, Japan
- Shimamoto Station, a railway station in Shimamoto, Osaka
