= Platica =

PLATİCA Inc.
- Type: Kabushiki kaisha
- Industry: Talent Agency
- Founded: 1 April 2008
- Headquarters: Tokyo, Japan
- Key people: Hiroshi Fujita, CEO
- Services: Management and promotion of talents and fashion models, etc.
- Website: PLATICA Inc.

PLATİCA Inc. (株式会社プラチカ, Kabushiki-kaisha Purachika), based in Tokyo, Japan, is a talent agency whose CEO is Hiroshi Fujita (藤田博士).

This firm was spun off from the tarento and model division of its parent company Face Network Co., Ltd. on 1 April 2008.

== Affiliated people ==
=== Male Talents ===
- Hiroki Hoshino (星野広樹)
- Takuya Yamato (大和啄也)

=== Female Talents ===
- Saori Horii
- Fifi (フィフィ)
- Nao Kudo (工藤菜緒)
- Kanae Miyauchi (宮内加奈恵)
- Natsumi Mizuno (水野夏美)
- Tomoko Shimokawa (下川友子)
- Rika Takeshita (竹下莉香)
- Hana Tojima (戸島花)
- Nonoka Yamazaki (山崎野乃華)

=== Fashion Models ===
- Alina (Alina)
- Chikage (千景)
- Setsu Katagiri (片桐セツ)
- Keito (恵都)
- Kewen (Kewen)
- Kiera (Kiera)
- Arisa Niikura (新倉有沙)
- Naomi Watanabe (渡辺奈緒美)
- Atsuko Yamakawa (山川敦子)

=== Junior Talents ===
- Sae Abe (阿部紗英)
- Raima Hiramatsu (平松來馬)
- Maria Hirooka (廣岡まりあ)
- Rina Jouzaki (城崎里奈)
- Mayuka Kuroda (黒田真友香)
- Nanase Matsushima (松嶋七星)
- Natsuki Ohta (太田菜月)
- Reira Suguro (勝呂玲羅)
- Yuu Yoshiki (吉識優)

=== Formerly Belonged ===
- Bobby Ologun
- Hidemi Hikita (疋田英美) - until March 2010
- Yumi Kobayashi - until March 2010
- Mao Mizoguchi - until March 2010
- Miu Yamaguchi (山口美羽) - until July 2008
