= Azusa (given name) =

Azusa (written: 梓, 梓沙, あづさ, あずさ, アズサ) is a Japanese unisex given name, literally meaning "catalpa" among other senses (other trees, and objects made from this wood). Notable people with the name include:

== Men ==
- Kinpei Azusa (あずさ 欣平; 1931–1997), Japanese voice actor
- Azusa Noa (野阿 梓; born 1954), Japanese science fiction writer
- Azusa Ono (小野 梓; 1852–1886), Japanese intellectual

== Women ==
- Michiyo Azusa (梓 みちよ; 1943-2020), Japanese singer
- Azusa Enoki (榎 あづさ; born 1988), Japanese actress and voice actress
- Azusa Hibino (日美野 梓; born 1990), Japanese model
- Azusa Inaba (稲葉 あずさ; born 2007), Japanese professional wrestler
- Azusa Iwashimizu (岩清水 梓; born 1986), Japanese association footballer
- Azusa Kishimoto (岸本 梓; 1985–2025), Japanese tarento and model
- Azusa Matsuzawa (松沢 梓; born 1992), Japanese former member of idol group 9nine
- Azusa Nagasawa (長澤 あずさ; born 1988), Japanese former AV actress
- Azusa Nakao (仲尾 あづさ; born 1972), Japanese voice actress
- Azusa Nakaoku (中奥 梓; born 1985), Japanese ice hockey goaltender
- Azusa Nojiri (野尻 あずさ; born 1982), Japanese marathon runner
- Azusa Oikawa (及川 あずさ; born 1960), Japanese fencer
- Azusa Sekine (関根 梓; born 1996), Japanese member of idol group Up Up Girls Kakko Kari
- Azusa Senou (瀬能 あづさ; born 1973), Japanese singer
- Azusa Sumi (鷲見 梓沙; born 1996), Japanese long-distance runner
- Azusa Tachibana (橘 杏咲; born 2004), Japanese voice actress
- Azusa Tadokoro (田所 あずさ; born 1993), Japanese voice actress
- Azusa Takigawa (滝川 あずさ; born 1987), Japanese retired professional wrestler
- Azusa Tanaka (田中 梓沙; born 2005), Japanese figure skater
- Azusa Togashi (富樫 あずさ; born 1990), Japanese gravure idol
- Azusa Watanabe (渡辺 梓; born 1969), Japanese actress
- Azusa Yamamoto (山本 梓; born 1981), Japanese gravure idol, actress and television personality
- Azusa Yamauchi (山内 梓; born 1998), Japanese archer

== Fictional characters ==
=== Men ===
- Azusa Hanai (花井 梓), a character from Big Windup!
- Azusa Kinose (木ノ瀬 梓), a character from Starry Sky
- Azusa Mukami (無神 アズサ), a character from Diabolik Lovers
- Azusa Asahina (朝日奈 梓), a character from Brothers Conflict

=== Women ===
- Azusa (あずさ), a character from Dead or Alive Xtreme Venus Vacation
- Azusa Miura (三浦 あずさ), a character from The Idolmaster
- Azusa Enomoto (榎本 梓), a character from Case Closed
- Azusa Azuki (小豆 梓), the main character from The "Hentai" Prince and the Stony Cat.
- Azusa "Azu-nyan" Nakano (中野 梓), a main character from K-On!
- Azusa Nakajo (中条 あずさ), a character from The Irregular at Magic High School
- Azusa Hamaoka (浜岡 梓), a character from Grand Blue
- Azusa Osawa (大沢 あずさ), a character from the video game Yakuza 5
- Azusa Sawa (澤 梓), one of the supporting protagonists from Girls und Panzer
- Azusa Suma (須磨 梓), a character from Master of Martial Hearts
- Azusa Yumi (弓 梓), a character from Soul Eater
- Azusa Fuyutsuki (冬月 あずさ), a character from Great Teacher Onizuka
- Azusa Shirasu (白洲 アズサ), a character from the role-playing video game Blue Archive
