= Sakura Ishimoto =

Japanese shogi player (born 1999)

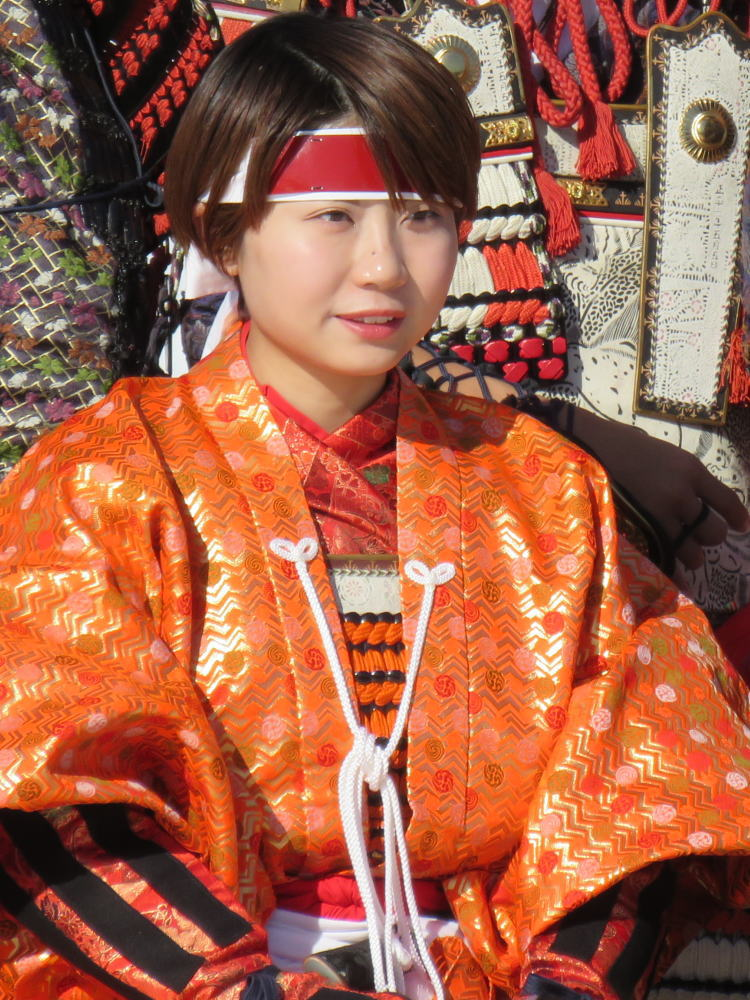
- Ishimoto at a human shogi event in November 2019
- Native name: 石本さくら
- Born: January 27, 1999 (age 27)
- Hometown: Suita, Osaka Prefecture

Career
- Achieved professional status: September 1, 2016 (aged 17)
- Badge number: W-57
- Rank: Women's 3-dan
- Teacher: Nobuo Mori (7-dan)
- Tournaments won: 1

Websites
- JSA profile page

Sakura Ishimoto (石本 さくら, Ishimoto Sakura; born January 27, 1999) is a Japanese women's professional shogi player ranked 3-dan.

== Early life, amateur shogi and apprenticeship ==
Ishimoto was born on January 27, 1999, in Suita, Osaka Prefecture. She first became interested in shogi when she was a fourth-grade elementary school student after seeing some classmates playing the game. She decided that she wanted to learn how to play the game and started attending a local shogi school shortly thereafter.

In 2010, she finished runner-up in the girl's division of the 4th Elementary School Student Girl's Meijin Tournament as well as in third place in the 3rd Elementary School Komehime Meijin tournaments as a sixth-grade elementary school student. Two years later in 2012, she won the girl's division of the 33rd All Japan Junior High School Student Invitational Shogi Tournament as a second-year junior high school student.

Ishimoto was accepted into the Japan Shogi Association (JSA) Kansai Branch's training group system. Although still an amateur player, she defeated a number of women's shogi professionals in the preliminary rounds of the 3rd (2013) and 4th (2014) Women's Ōza tournaments. In 2016, she was promoted to Class B1 of the training group system when she was a 17-year-old third year senior high school student, thus meeting the criteria for the rank of provisional women's professional 3-kyū. She petitioned the JSA, with shogi professional Nobuo Mori as her sponsor, to be allowed to compete as a women's professional and was awarded the rank of 2-kyū and full professional status based on her prior performance in the 2013 and 2014 Women's Oza tournaments.

== Women's shogi professional ==
Ishimoto defeated Kanna Suzuki in the finals of the 3rd Yamada Women's Professional Challenge Cup in August 2017 to win her first tournament as a professional. She advanced to the finals of the same tournament the following year, but was unsuccessful in her attempt to repeat as tournament champion, losing to Saya Nakazawa.

=== Promotion history ===
Ishimoto's promotion history is as follows.

- 2-kyū: September 1, 2016
- 1-kyū: February 20, 2017
- 1-dan: March 9, 2017
- 2-dan: December 14, 2020
- 3-dan: July 18, 2026

Note: All ranks are women's professional ranks.

=== Major titles and other championships ===
Ishimoto has yet to appear in a major title match, but she has won one official non-title women's professional shogi tournament.
