= Murota =

Murota (written: 室田) is a Japanese surname. Notable people with the surname include:

- Hideo Murota (室田 日出男, 1937–2002), Japanese actor
- Io Murota (室田 伊緒, born 1989), Japanese shogi player
- Kiyoshi Murota (室田 淳, born 1955), Japanese golfer
- Mizuki Murota (室田 瑞希, born 1998), Japanese singer and idol
