= Asuka Kishi =

Japanese gravure idol and actress

- 岸 明日香
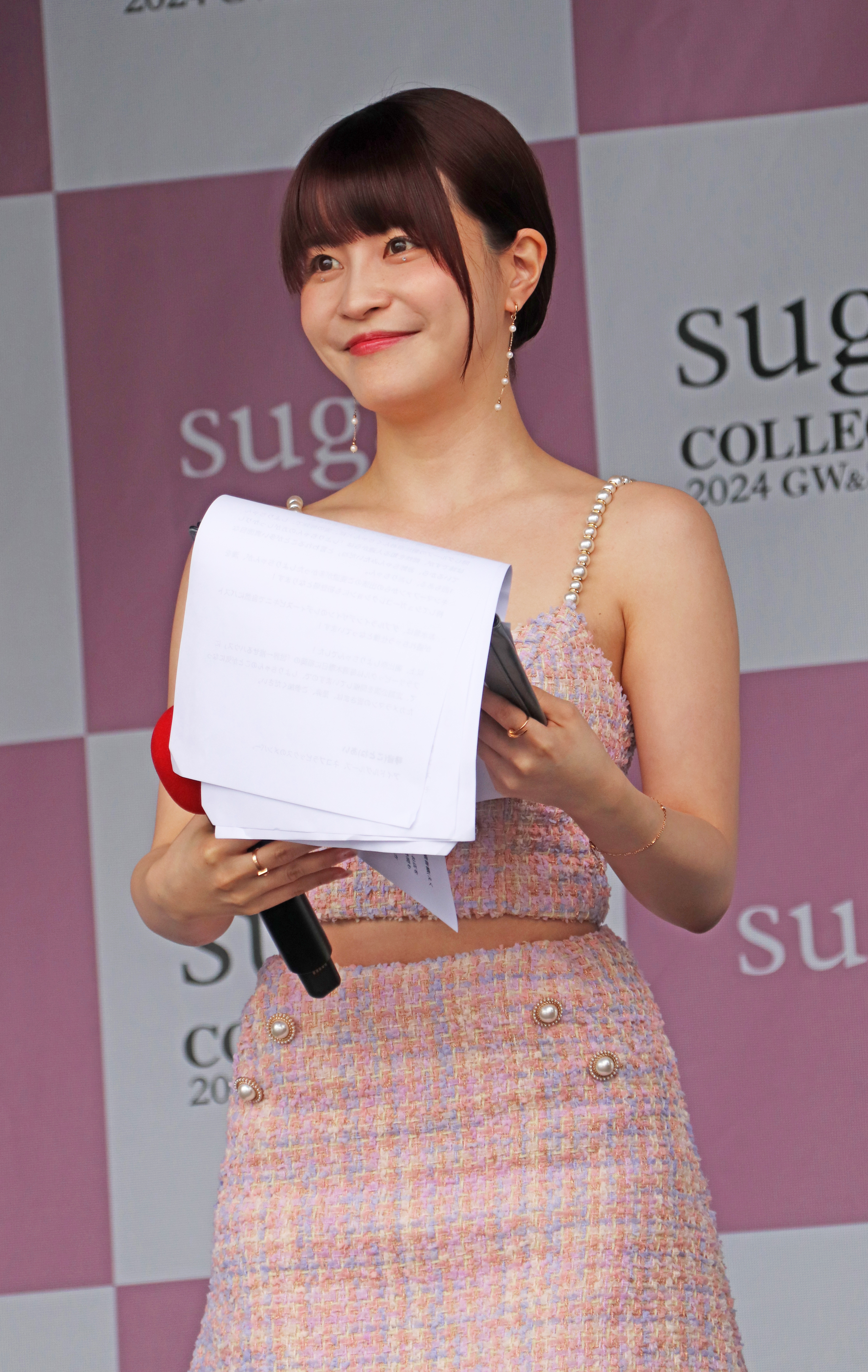
- Born: April 11, 1991 (age 35); Osaka Prefecture, Japan
- Other names: Asuka Yuzaki (柚崎 明日香, Yuzaki Asuka; former stage name); Asupon (あすぽん)
- Occupation: Gravure idol
- Years active: 2012–present
- Agent: Stardust Promotion

Asuka Kishi (岸 明日香, Kishi Asuka; born 11 April 1991) is a Japanese gravure idol, actress, and variety tarento. Kishi is represented by Stardust Promotion.

== Life and career ==
Kishi had carried out activities such as modelling in her birthplace at the Osaka area, and in March 2012 she moved to her current office and debuted with her current stage name. She was chosen as a member of the Daiichi Shokai image girl unit D Dream Girls.

When Kishi appeared in "Hannari G Cup" in Sunday Japon her catchphrase is "Iyashikei Hannari Yōsai" (Healing Hannari Venus File).

In 2013 she appeared in an advertisement for Dororich Girls 2 of Glico co-starring with Anna Konno, Ayaka Sayama, Arisa, and Mizuki Hoshina.

Between 2015 and 2016 Kishi collaborated with Japanese fashion brand Kiks Tyo on multiple limited edition "Kiks Girl" t-shirt releases.

== Filmography ==
=== TV drama ===
Year	Title	Role	Network	Notes	Ref.
2012	Soumatou Kabushikigaisha	Satomi	TBS	Episode 4	
2013	Tokyo Toy Box	Mari Abe	TV Tokyo		
2014	Dai Tokyo Toy Box	Mari Abe	TV Tokyo		
2014	Tetsuko no Sodate-kata	Yuko Minamida	NBN	Episode 1	
2014	Yonimo Kimyōna Monogatari '14 Aki no Tokubetsu-hen: Mirai Dorobō	Erika	Fuji TV		
2015	Keishichō Kyōkō-han: Ken Higuchi	Yukari	TV Tokyo	Episode 1	
2016	Keishichō Zero Gakari: Seikatsu Anzen-ka nan demo Sōdan-shitsu	Yayoi Sameshima	TV Tokyo		
2016	Otokomeshi	Kaori	TV Tokyo	Episode 7	

=== TV series ===
Year	Title	Network
	Sunday Japon	TBS
	Goddotan	TV Tokyo
	Guruguru Ninety Nine	NTV
	Shimura Ken	Fuji TV
	Ken Shimura no Daijōbu daa	Fuji TV
	Rank Oukaku	TBS
2013	24 Hour Television: Love Saves the Earth	NTV

=== Films ===
Year	Title	Role	Ref.
2014	Honey Flappers	Mai Kikukawa	
2015	Iron Girl: Ultimate Weapon	Miria Hanamura	
2015	W: Futatsu no Kao o Motsu Onna-tachi	Nana Hachiya	
2017	Tantei wa, Konya mo Yuuutsuna Yume wo Miru	Saori	

=== Advertisements ===
Year	Title	Notes
2013	Glico Dairy Dororich	As a member of Dororich Girls
	Jinro Try! Makgeolli series Sake Makgeolli	
2015	Kairi-sei Million Arthur	

=== Internet ===
Year	Title	Website	Notes
2014	Ki shimasu TV	Nico Jockey	Monthly regular appearances
2014	Utsukushī Hito ni Okora retai	TV Tokyo Play	
2014	Asuka to Rin no Big Small'n ni naritakunai	Nico Jockey	First Monday appearance
2015	Anri to Asuka no mada 10-ji	LoGiRL	Friday appearances
2016	Nanairo: Thursday	Modelpress TV by Hikari TV	Other Thursday appearances
2016	Abema Wave Saturday Night	AbemaTV	Saturday appearances

=== Image girl ===
Year	Title
2013	Daiichi Shokai Daiichi Kigyō Image Girl
2014	Pachislot Ambassador with S-Girls
2015	Heiwa Campaign Girl

=== Catalogues ===
Year	Title	Notes
2014	Peach John	Model
2014	Peach John Beauty	Model

== Publications ==
=== DVD ===
Year	Title
2012	Koi Yurara
2012	Milky Glamour
2012	Asupuru
2013	Fuka-Fuka
2013	Koi Gokoro
2013	Fuwafuwa Drops
2013	Kissing
2014	Kaoru ashita
2014	Ore no Asuka
2014	Sweet Life
2015	Natural
2015	Asuka Biyori
2015	Fuwafuwa fururu
2016	AD Asupon

== Bibliography ==
=== Photobooks ===
Year	Title
2014	Asuka
2015	Second Coming
