= Kenji Kobayashi =

Japanese shogi player

- Native name: 小林健二
- Born: March 31, 1957 (age 69)
- Hometown: Takamatsu, Kagawa

Career
- Achieved professional status: December 20, 1975 (aged 18)
- Badge number: 123
- Rank: 9-dan
- Retired: March 31, 2022 (aged 65)
- Teacher: Susumu Itaya (9-dan)
- Tournaments won: 2
- Career record: 699–775 (.474)
- Notable students: Takashi Ikenaga; Yūta Komori; Ryō Shimamoto; Seiya Tomita; Akihiro Ida; Kenshi Tokuda; Saito Morimoto; Shinobu Iwane; Keika Kitamura; Juri Kimura

Websites
- JSA profile page

Kenji Kobayashi (小林健二, Kobayashi Kenji; born March 31, 1957) is a Japanese retired professional shogi player who achieved the rank of 9-dan. He is also a former director of the Japanese Shogi Association.

== Early life and apprenticeship ==
Kobayashi was born in Takamatsu, Kagawa on March 31, 1957. He entered the Japan Shogi Association's apprentice school in 1972 at the rank of 6-kyū under the guidance of professional shogi player Susumu Itaya. At first, Kobayashi pursued his apprenticeship at the Japan Shogi Association's school in Tokyo; however, he soon began to have health problems, and moved to Nagoya to study under Itaya as a uchi-deshi (a live-in apprentice). He was promoted to the rank of apprentice professional 1-dan in 1974 and obtained full-professional status and the rank of 4-dan in December 1975.

== Shogi professional ==
Kobayashi became the 40th professional to win his 600th official game when he defeated Kaishū Tanaka in Meijin Class C1 tournament play on June 9, 2009.

In March 2018, Kobayashi finished the 76th Meijin Class C2 league (April 2017 – March 2018) with a record of 3 wins and 7 losses, earning a second consecutive demotion point which meant he was only one point away from automatic demotion to "Free Class" play. As a result, he declared his intention to the Japan Shogi Association to become a Free Class player as of April 2018 rather than risk automatic demotion.

Kobayashi retired from professional shogi on March 31, 2022. His career record was 699 wins and 774 losses.

=== Promotion history ===
The promotion history for Kobayashi is as follows:

- 6-kyū: 1972
- 1-dan: 1974
- 4-dan: December 20, 1975
- 5-dan: April 1, 1979
- 6-dan: April 1, 1981
- 7-dan: April 1, 1983
- 8-dan: April 1, 1986
- 9-dan: March 1, 2002

=== Titles and other championships ===
Kobayashi never appeared in a major title match, but he won two non-major shogi championships during his career: the Young Lions in 1977 and the Hayazashi Senshuken in 1994.

=== Awards and honors ===
Kobayashi received the Japan Shogi Association's "Best New Player" (1980) and "Technique Award" (1990) Annual Shogi Awards. He also received the association's "25 Years Service Award" in 2000 for being an active professional for twenty-five years and the "Shogi Honor Award" in 2009 for winning 600 official games.

=== Theoretical contributions ===
Together with Masataka Sugimoto he was well-known for systematizing Fourth File Rook josekis before the advent of the Fujii System, and also as the creator of the Super Fourth File Rook opening (スーパー四間飛車).

== JSA director ==
Kobayashi served on the Japan Shogi Association's board of directors as a director from 1999 to 2004.
