= Yoshizawa =

Yoshizawa (written: 吉沢, 吉澤 or 芳沢) is a Japanese surname. Notable people with the surname include:

- Akie Yoshizawa (吉沢 秋絵, born 1968), Japanese idol, singer and actress
- Akiho Yoshizawa (吉沢 明歩, born 1984), Japanese gravure idol and AV actress
- Akira Yoshizawa (吉澤 章, 1911–2005), Japanese origamist
- Yoshizawa Ayame (吉沢 菖蒲), stage name for several kabuki actors
- Hideo Yoshizawa (吉沢 秀雄), Japanese video game designer
- Hideo Yoshizawa (footballer) (吉澤 英生, born 1971), Japanese footballer and manager
- Hiroshi Yoshizawa (吉沢 広司, 1931–2013), Japanese ski jumper
- Hisae Yoshizawa (吉澤 久恵, born 1966), Japanese football referee
- Hitomi Yoshizawa (吉澤 ひとみ, born 1985), Japanese idol, singer and actress
- Ichiro Yoshizawa (吉沢 一郎, 1903–1998), Japanese mountain climber
- Jumpei Yoshizawa (吉澤 純平, born 1985), Japanese speed skater
- Ken Yoshizawa (吉澤 賢, born 1978), Japanese hurdler
- Kenkichi Yoshizawa (芳沢 謙吉, 1874–1965), Japanese diplomat
- Masakazu Yoshizawa (吉沢 政和, 1950-2007), Japanese-American musician
- Motoharu Yoshizawa (吉沢 元治, 1931–1998), Japanese musician
- Ryo Yoshizawa (吉沢 亮, born 1994), Japanese actor
- Sarii Yoshizawa (吉沢 さりぃ, born 1985), Japanese gravure idol
