= Azusa =

Azusa may refer to:

== Relating to California ==
From a Native American language, likely Tongva Asuksagna:

- Azusa, California, a city in the United States
- Azusa Pacific University, a Christian-based institution in Azusa, California
- Azusa Street Revival, a Christian movement that began in Los Angeles

== Other uses ==
- Azusa (given name)
- Azusa (train), a limited express train service in Japan
- Azusa (band), a metal band
- Azusa, the Japanese cherry birch (Betula grossa)
  - Azusa Yumi, a bow made from the wood of the Japanese cherry birch
- AZUSA, a radar interferometer
