= Kōhei Hasebe =

Kōhei Hasebe may refer to:

- Kōhei Hasebe (baseball)
- Kōhei Hasebe (shogi)
