= Togashi =

Togashi (written: 富樫 or 冨樫) is a Japanese surname. Notable people with the surname include:

- Azusa Togashi (富樫 あずさ, born 1990), Japanese gravure idol
- Cayman Togashi (富樫 敬真, born 1993), Japanese footballer
- Go Togashi (富樫 豪, born 1984), Japanese footballer
- Hiroyuki Togashi (born 1955), Japanese politician
- Koichi Togashi (冨樫 剛一, born 1971), Japanese footballer and manager
- Masachika Togashi (富樫政親, died 1488), shugo in the Muromachi period
- Masahiko Togashi (富樫 雅彦, 1940–2007), Japanese jazz percussionist and composer
- Misuzu Togashi (富樫 美鈴), Japanese voice actress and singer
- Shin Togashi (冨樫 森, born 1960), Japanese film director
- Yoshihiro Togashi (冨樫 義博, born 1966), Japanese manga artist
- Yuki Togashi (富樫 勇樹, born 1993), Japanese basketball player
- Yuta Togashi (富樫 佑太, born 1995), Japanese footballer

== See also ==
- 9277 Togashi, a main-belt asteroid
