= Yūya Saitō =

Japanese shogi player (born 1997)

- Native name: 齊藤裕也
- Born: May 29, 1997 (age 28)
- Hometown: Kuwana, Mie, Japan

Career
- Achieved professional status: October 1, 2022 (aged 25)
- Badge Number: 334
- Rank: 4-dan
- Teacher: Masataka Sugimoto (9-dan)
- Meijin class: C2
- Ryūō class: 6

Websites
- JSA profile page

Yūya Saitō (齊藤 裕也, Yūya Saitō; May 29, 1997) is a Japanese professional shogi player ranked 4-dan.

== Early life and apprentice shogi professional ==
Yūya Saitō was born in Kuwana, Mie, on May 29, 1997. He learned how to play shogi from his parents at the age of five-years-old, and eventually became good enough to enter the Japan Shogi Association's training group for the Tōkai region in Nagoya. Saitō commuted back and forth to his training group games by highway bus, and performed well enough to be promoted to Group A2 and qualify for the JSA's apprentice school at the age of 15 years old in June 2012. Saito entered the apprentice school that same month at the rank of 6-kyū under the tutelage of shogi professional Masataka Sugimoto.

Saitō progressed slowly through the apprentice school, particularly in comparison to the progress of fellow Sugimoto student Sōta Fujii who is five years younger and who entered the apprentice school three months later than Saitō. Fujii's progress was so remarkable that Saitō felt it was impossible to use it for motivation. After being promoted to 2-dan, Saitō's progress stalled and poor results led to his demotion back to 1-dan, which he said was quite discouraging because he found himself competing against elementary school and junior high school students even though he had already entered university by that time. By the time he was promoted to the rank of apprentice professional 3-dan in April 2022, he was already 25 years old and only one year away from mandatory retirement as an apprentice professional. Saito began the 71st 3-dan League (April 2022 – September 2022) seeded 39th out of 41 players, which meant he would be at a disadvantage when it came to tie breakers. His 3-dan league opponents, however, were closer to his age which made him feel less pressure to win, and he entered the final two rounds of play tied for first. After splitting his final two games and seeing some of his closest competitors falter, Saitō obtained full professional status and the corresponding rank of 4-dan in September 2022 by tying for first with Nagisa Fujimoto with a record of 13 wins and 5 losses. Saitō promotion to 4-dan made him the oldest player to do so after spending only one season in the 3-dan League.

== Shogi professional ==
=== Playing style ===
Saitō mainly plays Ranging Rook openings and states he was influenced by books about such openings written by Daisuke Suzuki.

=== Promotion history ===
The promotion history for Saitō is as follows.

- 6-kyū: June 2012
- 3-dan: April 2022
- 4-dan: October 1, 2022

== Personal life ==
Saitō graduated from the College of Policy Science of Ritsumeikan University in 2020. He is the second alumnus, after Seiya Tomita, of Ritsumeikan University to become a professional shogi player.
