= Takashi Ikenaga =

Japanese shogi player (born 1993)

- Native name: 池永天志
- Born: April 20, 1993 (age 33)
- Hometown: Osaka

Career
- Achieved professional status: April 1, 2018 (aged 24)
- Badge number: 314
- Rank: 7-dan
- Teacher: Kenji Kobayashi (9-dan)
- Tournaments won: 2
- Meijin class: C1
- Ryūō class: 2

Websites
- JSA profile page

Takashi Ikenaga (池永 天志, Ikenaga Takashi; April 20, 1993) is a Japanese professional shogi player ranked 7-dan.

== Early life and apprentice professional ==
Ikenaga was born in Osaka on April 20, 1993. He learned how to play shogi from a book his father bought for him when he was first grade elementary school student.

In September 2006, Ikenaga was accepted into the Japan Shogi Association (JSA) apprentice school at the rank of 6-kyū as a student of shogi professional Kenji Kobayashi. He was promoted to the rank of apprentice professional 3-dan in 2010, and obtained full professional status and the corresponding rank of 4-dan in April 2018 tying for first with Kōhei Hasebe in the 62nd 3-dan League (October 2017 – March 2018) with a record of 14 wins and 4 losses.

== Shogi professional ==
In October 2019, Ikenaga defeated apprentice professional 3-dan Shin'ichirō Hattori 2 games to 1 to win the 9th Kakogawa Seiryū Tournament. In October 2020, Ikenaga defeated apprentice professional 3-dan Yūki Saitō 2 games to none to win the 51st Shinjin-Ō tournament.

=== Promotion history ===
Ikenaga's promotion history is as follows:

- 6-kyū: September 2006
- 3-dan: April 2010
- 4-dan: April 1, 2018
- 5-dan: April 3, 2021
- 6-dan: April 17, 2024
- 7-dan: November 11, 2026

=== Titles and other championships ===
Ikenaga has yet to appear in a major title match, but he has won two non-major title championships.

=== Awards and honors ===
Ikenaga won the Japan Shogi Association's Annual Shogi Award for "Best New Player" for the 2020–2021 shogi year.
