= Airi Shimizu =

Japanese gravure idol, actress and television personality

- 清水 あいり
- Born: 17 December 1992 (age 33); Hirakata, Osaka, Japan
- Other names: Airi Hirayama (former stage name); Airi Kurose (former stage name); Airin (あいりん)
- Occupations: Gravure idol; actress; variety tarento
- Agent: Trustar
- Style: General modelling; bathing suits
- Height: 156 cm (5 ft 1 in)
- Spouse: Unknown (m. 2024)
- Awards: 2010: Zak The Queen Associate Grand Prix; 2010: 5th Real Audition (Multi Actress) Grand Prize

Airi Shimizu (清水 あいり, Shimizu Airi; born 17 December 1992, in Hirakata, Osaka) is a Japanese gravure idol, actress and variety tarento. She was active under the names Airi Hirayama (平山 藍里, Hirayama Airi) and Airi Kurose (黒瀬 あいり, Kurose Airi). She has been represented by Emsworth, then Fantastar (part of Vithmic), and later Trustar.

== Personal life ==
On 11 July 2024, she announced her marriage to a general man.

== Filmography ==
Prior to September 2012, she was active under the name Airi Hirayama.

=== Films ===
Year	Title	Role	Ref.
2008	Ai no kokoro	Ai Okita	
2010	Aeteyokatta	Yukie Kobayashi	
2010	Fuyu no Hana	Kui Sugiura	
2011	Suiginchū no Koi	Yumi Minami	
2012	Sai Ai	Rena Fujisawa	
2015	All Esper Dayo!	Shizuka	
2016	Cinderella Game	Ayame Murasakikaki	

=== Stage ===
Year	Title	Ref.
2005	Aoi Tori	
2006	Oz to Mahōtsukai	
2010	Oneichan's Eleven	
2010	Oneichan's Twelve	
2010	Himawarihatake to Chōchin to Aitsu.	
2011	Dai Dorobō: Sachiko Ishikawa	
2011	Dangerous Cutie	
2011	Ikeda-ya Check In	

=== Television ===
Year	Title	Network	Ref.
2006	Kira Kira Afro	TVO	
2010	Hori Summers	TBS	
2010	Bikisupo!	Mondo TV	
2012	Banana Fire	Tokyo MX	
2012	Goddotan	TV Tokyo	
2012	Miraretel	Fuji TV	
2014	Kyūyo Meisai 2	TV Tokyo	
2014	Zenryoku-zaka	TV Asahi	
2014	Music Dragon	NTV	
2016	Neo Kessen Variety: King-chan	TV Tokyo	
2017	Shimura& Tsurube no abunai kōyū-roku	TV Asahi	
2017	Lab Ho no Ueno-san	Fuji TV	

=== Advertisements ===
Year	Title
	HiteJinro "Makkori"
2015	NotTV web "6-Ri no Afro"

=== DVD ===
Year	Title	Ref.
2010	Real Audition Nadeshiko (Multi-Joyū)	
2010	Airi Hirayama My Girl	
2011	Special Omnibus My Girl	
2011	Venus! Airi Hirayama Angel Kiss –Pururun Journey–	
2011	Rio Natsume & Airi Hirayama My Girl	
2011	Airi Hirayama My Girl 2	
2013	Oishī Airi	
2013	Airi-sensei to Asobou	
2013	Aruonna no Nichijō	
2014	My Lovely Doll	
2014	Watashi no Ichibubun 2	
2015	Koi no Yokan	
2016	Koi no Saikai	

=== Photo albums ===
Year	Title	Ref.
2012	Kiken na Distance image.tv Digital Shashin-shū	
2013	Gekkan Airi Shimizu × Maki Miyashita Digital Book	
2014	magnetic G Airi Shimizu vol. 1	
2014	magnetic G Airi Shimizu vol. 2	
2015	"Aruonna no Nichijō" Airi Shimizu: Digital Shashin-shū	
2015	Okomari Kateikyōshi: Airi Shimizu	
2015	Kyōei-bu: Katsudō Nisshi: Airi Shimizu	
2015	Lolipai H Cup: Airi Shimizu	
2015	Kakure Kyonyū Jogakusei: Airi Shimizu	
2015	Airi Shimizu Complete vol. 1	
2016	magnetic G Airi Shimizu "Love Body"	

=== Others ===
Year	Title	Ref.
2013	Fantastar Channel	
2014	Basara-Bu: Otome-gumi!	
2015	Joy Sound Gravure Saiten Movie	
2015	PSO 2 Arcs Kōhō-tai!	
2017	Airi Shimizu x Kiks Tyo Kiks Girl Tees	
