= Aya Imai =

Japanese shogi player

- Native name: 今井 絢
- Born: October 25, 2001 (age 23)
- Hometown: Nagoya, Japan

Career
- Achieved professional status: February 1, 2023 (aged 21)
- Badge Number: W-83
- Rank: Women's 1-dan
- Teacher: Masataka Sugimoto (8-dan)

Websites
- JSA profile page

Aya Imai (今井 絢, Imai Aya; born October 25, 2001) is a Japanese women's professional shogi player ranked 1-dan. She is the first women's professional shogi player to come from Nagoya.

== Early life and becoming a women's professional shogi player ==
Imai was born in Nagoya on October 25, 2001. She learned how to play shogi from her father when she was five years old. At first, she mainly played against her older brother and continued to improve to the point where she start attending a local shogi school. As a second-grade elementary school student, she entered the Tokai branch of the Japan Shogi Association's training group system under the tutelage of shogi professional Masataka Sugimoto. By June 2016, she had performed well enough in the training school system to qualify for women's professional status even though she was still a third-year junior high school student, but decided to enter the JSA's professional apprentice school instead to try and obtain regular professional status. At the end of November 2022, she decided to formally leave the apprentice school at the rank of 1-kyū because she did not feel she would be able to achieve promotion to the next rank of 1-dan in accordance with JSA apprentice school's rules which require that apprentice professionals achieve said rank within one year of turning 21 years old. She decided to switch over to women's professional shogi, and formally requested to be allowed do so in January 2023. The JSA accepted her request and awarded her the rank of women's professional 1-kyū since that rank she had achieved as an apprentice professional.

== Women's shogi professional ==
=== Promotion history ===
Imai's promotion history is as follows.

- 1-kyū: February 1, 2023
- 1-dan: August 20, 2023

Note: All ranks are women's professional ranks.

== Personal life ==
Imai is the first women's professional from Nagoya. As of February 2023, she is a third-year university student at Doshisha University.
