= Fudanjuku =

Japanese idol girl group

Fudanjuku 風男塾
- Also known as: Nakano Fujo Sisters (中野腐女シスターズ, 中野風女シスターズ)
- Origin: Japan
- Genre: J-pop
- Years active: 2006–2011 (as Nakano Fujo Sisters); 2007–present (as Fudanjuku)
- Labels: Imperial Records; K Dash Stage
- Members: Yuzuki Kanta; Hanashiro Riku; Hazaki Allan; Kurumizawa Kotaro; Akaboshi Yoshimune; Tendou Taiyo; Koushi Jyogen
- Past members: Kuryuu Masaki; Kanna Touma; Ibuki Miyabi; Hasegawa Ai; Tanabe Emi; Kitamuro Aya; Azuma Sakura; Rei Fujita; Kana Seguchi; Kanae Shimokariya; Erika Ura; Yūka Konan; Yūka Kyōmoto; Maki Fukumi; Chiaki Kyan; Mariru Harada; Yōko Inui; Hirono Arai; Sae Yamamoto
- Website: nfs724.com

Fudanjuku (風男塾) is a sub-group of the Japanese idol girl group Nakano Fujo Sisters and was formed in 2007 by Imperial Records. Fudanjuku is Nakano Fujo Sisters' alter-ego boy band, in which the members take on male personas and dress. Fudanjuku released their debut single "Otokozuka" in 2008 and later stopped performing as Nakano Fujo Sisters in 2011 to focus on Fudanjuku full-time.

== History ==
In 2006, the Nakano Fujoshi Sisters were formed as a comic performance troupe, consisting of gravure models and actresses who considered themselves otaku and fujoshi. In 2010, they renamed themselves Nakano Fujo Sisters and began releasing original music. While performing multiple live shows under the name Nakano Fujo Sisters, the group formed a male-alter ego for themselves, Fudanjuku, to make performances more interesting. The group released their debut single in 2008.

After November 25, 2011, the activities of the group Nakano Fujo Sisters were placed on hiatus. Fudanjuku, however, continues to perform and release new works.

== Subgroups ==
=== Fudanjuku ===
Fudanjuku (風男塾, formerly 腐男塾 prior to Shijuuin Yousuke's graduation) is an "alter ego" male idol group of Nakano Fujo Sisters.

=== W Prince ===
With the graduation of Seimyouji Uramasa and Akazono Kojiro, the remaining two senior members formed a duo-idol group in 2017 titled W♠PRINCE.

== Members ==
The members use their real names as Nakano Fujo Sisters and their male stage names when performing as Fudanjuku.

- Ai Hasegawa (長谷川 愛) / Kensui Aiba (愛刃 健水)
- Emi Tanabe (田部 絵美) / Sora Kusakabe (草歌部 宙)
- Kiko Sueyoshi (末吉 咲子) / Masaki Kuryu (紅竜 真咲)
- Uchida Yuuga (内田夕雅) / Ibuki Miyabi (偉舞喜 雅)
- Komori Nina (小森虹那) / Kanna Touma (神那 橙摩)

=== Former members ===
- Sakura Azuma (東さくら) / Sotaro Oji (桜司 爽太郎)
- Aya Kitamuro (北室亜弥) / Katsuki Daiya (香月 大弥)
- Rei Fujita (藤田 怜) / Leo Fujimori (藤守 怜生)
- Kana Seguchi (瀬口 かな) / Kōki Seto (瀬斗 光黄)
- Kanae Shimokariya (下仮屋 カナエ) / Light Kariyase (仮屋世 来音)
- Erika Ura (浦 えりか) / Seimyōji Uramasa (青明寺 浦正)
- Yūka Konan (虎南 有香) / Kōjirō Akazono (赤園 虎次郎)
- Yūka Kyōmoto (京本 有加) / Kyōhei Midorikawa (緑川 狂平)
- Maki Fukumi (福見 真紀) / Ryōma Yukimura (雪村 涼真)
- Chiaki Kyan (喜屋武 ちあき) / Momotarō Bukiya (武器屋 桃太郎)
- Mariru Harada (原田 まりる) / Renji Ruhara (流原 蓮次)
- Yōko Inui (乾 曜子) / Yōsuke Shijūin (紫集院 曜介)
- Hirono Arai (新井 寛乃) / Kanbae Saiki (彩黄 寛兵衛)
- Sae Yamamoto (山本 紗衣) / Zan Kisaragi (ザン・黄更城)
- Yūko Kimura (木村 裕子)
- An Nanba (南波 杏)
- Asuka Ruike (類家 明日香)
- Aya Kanai (金井 あや)

== Discography ==
=== Singles ===
Title	Release date	Oricon Weekly Single Chart	Group
"Otokozaka" (男坂)	September 24, 2008	12	Fudanjuku (腐男塾)
"Ore no Sora" (俺の空)	March 18, 2009	11	Fudanjuku (腐男塾)
"Katsunda" (勝つんだ!)	June 3, 2009	7	Fudanjuku (腐男塾)
"Honey Bee" (Honey Bee〜)	January 20, 2010	6	Nakano Fujoshi Sisters (中野腐女シスターズ)
"Muteki! Natsu Yasumi" (無敵!夏休み)	June 23, 2010	6	Fudanjuku (腐男塾)
"Onaji Jidai ni Umareta Wakamonotachi" (同じ時代に生まれた若者たち)	November 24, 2010	11	Fudanjuku (腐男塾)
"Love Spider"	September 21, 2011	13	Fudanjuku (腐男塾)
"Kaze Ikki" (風一揆)	January 18, 2012	12	Fudanjuku (腐男塾)
"Ame Tokidoki Hare Nochi Niji" (雨ときどき晴れのち虹)	May 23, 2012	13	Fudanjuku (腐男塾)
"Jinsei Wahaha!" (人生わははっ!)	January 9, 2013	9	Fudanjuku (腐男塾)
"Shita o Muite Kaerō / Rikishi-man" (下を向いて帰ろう/RIKISHI-MAN)	May 15, 2013	7	Fudanjuku (腐男塾)
"Dansō Revolution" (男装レボリューション)	September 18, 2013	6	Fudanjuku (腐男塾)
"Chenmen Tengoku" (チェンメン天国)	January 22, 2014	4	Fudanjuku (腐男塾)
"Be Hero"	September 24, 2014	2	Fudanjuku (腐男塾)
"Shunkan Tourai Future" (瞬間到来フューチャー)	March 31, 2015	7	Fudanjuku (腐男塾)
"Moshimo... Kore ga Koi Nara" (もしも これが恋なら)	September 30, 2015	8	Fudanjuku (腐男塾)
"Tomodachi to Yoberu kimi e" (友達と呼べる君へ)	January 24, 2016	6	Fudanjuku (腐男塾)
"Noir (noir)" (NOIR〜ノワール〜)	August 31, 2016	18	Fudanjuku (腐男塾)
"Akashi – Soulmate (証-soul mate-)	February 18, 2017	2	Fudanjuku (腐男塾)
"Mou, Kimi Igai... (もう君以外．．．)	July 5, 2017		W♠PRINCE
"Aratanaru Makuakeno Tameno Makuakeni Yoru Kyooshikyoku~Kimiga Ireba Oretachimo Egao∞(Mugendai)~ (新たなる幕開けのための幕開けによる狂詩曲〜キミがいればオレたちも笑顔∞(無限大)〜)	November 15, 2017	12	Fudanjuku (腐男塾)
"Kimi Iroiro Utsuri" (君色々移り)	June 13, 2018	5	Fudanjuku (腐男塾)
"Tsubame" (ツバメ)	January 30, 2019	7	Fudanjuku (腐男塾)
"Dash&Daaash!!"	June 19, 2019	3	Fudanjuku (腐男塾)
"Sunny"	November 6, 2019	4	Fudanjuku (腐男塾)
"Setsuna (Setsuna)" (Setsuna -刹那-)	November 4, 2026	6	

=== Studio albums ===
List of studio albums, with selected chart positions
Title	Year	Album details	Peak chart positions
Title	Year	Album details	JPN
As Fudanjuku
Kizuna (絆)	2009	Released: September 23, 2009; Label: Imperial; Formats: CD, digital download	24
Otoko (音鼓-OTOKO-)	2012	Released: August 29, 2012; Label: Imperial; Formats: CD, digital download	18
Power of Wind	2014	Released: March 19, 2014; Label: Imperial; Formats: CD, digital download	17
Star Traveler	2016	Released: March 30, 2016; Label: Imperial; Formats: CD, digital download	14
Kaze Fight! (風ァイト!)	2018	Released: October 10, 2018; Label: Imperial; Formats: CD, digital download	10
Funfare	2021	Released: March 17, 2021; Label: Imperial; Formats: CD, digital download	9
One Fu All, All Fu One	2023	Released: October 11, 2023; Label: Imperial; Formats: CD, digital download	9
As Fudanjuku & Nakano Fujo Sisters
Friends (『腐レンズ』)	2013	Released: May 24, 2011; Label: Imperial; Formats: CD, digital download	10

=== Concert DVD ===
Release date	Title	Notes	Group
Space Peace 2010 ~ Sechi e no Ashiato~ (スペースピース2010〜聖地への足跡〜)	May 4, 2011		Fudanjuku & Nakano Fujo Sisters (腐男塾・中野腐女シスターズ)
BIG FU-ORCE LIVE EX -kansha- (BIG 腐ORCE LIVE EX -感謝-)	July 28, 2011	Graduation of Shijuuin Yousuke	Fudanjuku & Nakano Fujo Sisters (腐男塾・中野腐女シスターズ)
Fudanjuku Ranbu 2012 ~5-nen-me totsunyu! Muteki no kaze otoko(fudan), ore no onaji LOVE tokidoki katsunda! O – EAST itsumo arigatou! ! (風男塾乱舞2012 〜5年目突入!無敵の風男、俺の同じLOVEときどき勝つんだ!O-EASTいつもありがとう!!)	August 29, 2012	5 Year Anniversary Celebration Live DVD	Fudanjuku (風男塾)
Fudanjuku Ranbu Tour 2014 ~Ichigo Nijuuichie~ Final Hibiya Yagai Ongaku Dou (風男塾乱舞TOUR 2014 〜一期二十一会〜 FINAL 日比谷野外大音楽堂)	February 18, 2015	Graduation of Bukiya Momotaro	Fudanjuku (風男塾)
Fudanjuku Live Tour 2015 ~Love Messenger~ Final Shinagawa Stellar Ball (風男塾ライブツアー2015 〜ラブメッセンジャー〜 FINAL 品川ステラボール)	October 14, 2015	Limited Edition Graduation of Yukimura Ryouma	Fudanjuku (風男塾)
Fudanjuku x nicofarre Midorikawa Kyohei Sotsugyo Kouen Enishi ~enishi~ (風男塾×ニコファーレ 緑川狂平卒業公演「縁～enishi～」)	April 5, 2016	Limited Edition Graduation of Midorikawa Kyouhei	Fudanjuku (風男塾)
Uramasa・Kojiro Graduation Performance 「Make A Next Story...」 (浦正・虎次郎卒業公演「Make A Next Story...」)	March 17, 2017	Limited Edition Graduation of Seimyouji Uramasa and Akazono Kojiro	Fudanjuku (風男塾)
Fudanjuku Live Tour 2016 – 2017 〜 WITH +〜 FINAL Nakano Sunplaza Hall (風男塾ライブツアー2016–2017 〜WITH+〜 FINAL 中野サンプラザホール)	March 22, 2017	The final concert of Fudanjuku Live Tour 2016 – 2017 ~ WİTH +	Fudanjuku (風男塾)

== Other media ==
=== Manga ===
In 2011, Arina Tanemura, who is friends with the members of Fudanjuku, wrote and illustrated Fudanjuku Monogatari (風男塾物語), a manga adaptation featuring fictional portrayals of their male alter-egos. The comic ran for seven chapters in Margaret. Tanemura had drawn the comic after Fudanjuku had expressed interest in cosplaying as her characters. A vomic (voice comic) adaptation covering the first chapter was released in four parts on a weekly basis in 2012, with the members of Fudanjuku providing the voices to the characters.

No.	Japanese release date	Japanese ISBN
1	February 15, 2012	978-4-08-782426-1
