= Kanna Suzuki =

Japanese shogi player (born 1987)

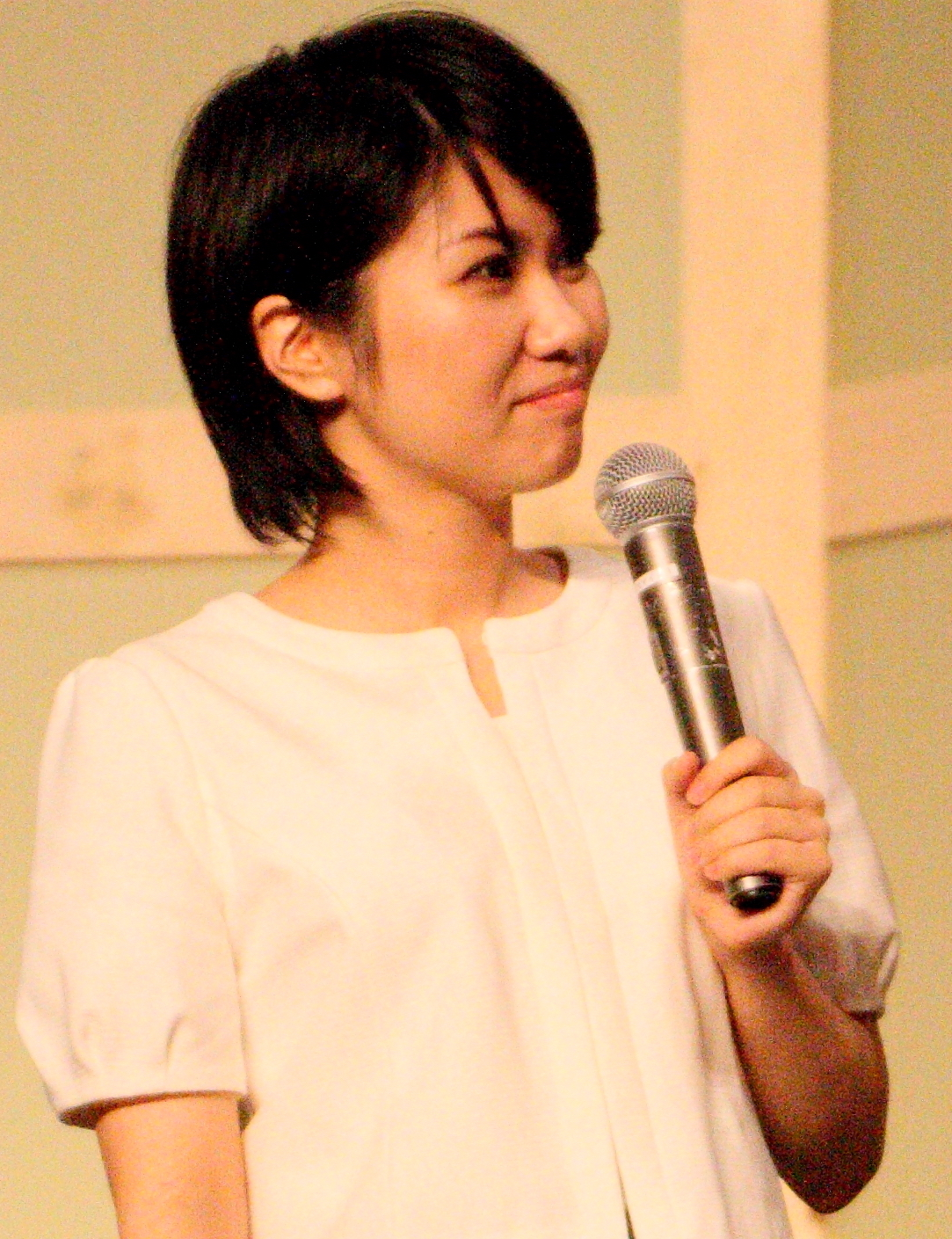
- Suzuki at a shogi event in August 2014.
- Native name: 鈴木環那
- Born: November 5, 1987 (age 37)
- Hometown: Futtsu, Chiba Prefecture

Career
- Achieved professional status: October 1, 2002 (aged 14)
- Badge Number: W-29
- Rank: Women's 3-dan
- Teacher: Yasuo Harada (9-dan)

Websites
- JSA profile page

Kanna Suzuki (鈴木 環那, Suzuki Kanna; born November 5, 1987) is a Japanese women's professional shogi player ranked 3-dan.

== Women's shogi professional ==
Suzuki advanced to the finals of the 3rd Yamada Women's Professional Challenge Cup in August 2017, but lost to Sakura Ishimoto.

=== Promotion history ===
Suzuki's promotion history is as follows.

- 2-kyū: October 1, 2002
- 1-kyū: April 1, 2004
- 1-dan: April 1, 2006
- 2-dan: May 10, 2012
- 3-dan: September 22, 2020

Note: All ranks are women's professional ranks.
