= Juri Kimura (shogi) =

Japanese shogi player (born 2008)

- Native name: 木村 朱里
- Born: July 11, 2008 (age 17)
- Hometown: Takashima, Shiga, Japan

Career
- Achieved professional status: June 1, 2022 (aged 13)
- Badge Number: W-79
- Rank: Women's 1-dan
- Teacher: Kenji Kobayashi (9-dan)

Websites
- JSA profile page

Juri Kimura (木村 朱里, Kimura Juri; born July 11, 2008) is a Japanese women's professional shogi player ranked 1-dan. She is the first person from Shiga Prefecture to become a professional shogi player.

== Early life and becoming a women's professional shogi player ==
Kimura was born in Takashima, Shiga on July 11, 2008. She became interested in shogi after watching her older brother play and father play when she was a first-grade elementary school student, and then learned how to play at a neighborhood club for senior citizens. She performed well in a number of shogi tournaments for elementary school students, and then won the girl's division of the 42nd All Japan Junior High School Student Invitational Shogi Tournament as a first-grade junior high school student in August 2021. She subsequently entered the Kansai branch of the Japan Shogi Association's training group system under the tutledge of shogi professional Kenji Kobayashi and qualified for women's professional status after being promoted to training group B2 in April 2022.

== Women's shogi professional ==
=== Promotion history ===
Kimura's promotion history is as follows.

- 2-kyū: June 1, 2022
- 1-kyū: January 26, 2023
- 1-dan: April 1, 2024

Note: All ranks are women's professional ranks.

== Personal life ==
Kimura is the first professional shogi player, regular or women's, from Shiga Prefecture.
