= Takehiro Ōhira =

Japanese shogi player (born 1977)

- Native name: 大平武洋
- Born: May 11, 1977 (age 48)
- Hometown: Kita, Tokyo

Career
- Achieved professional status: April 1, 2002 (aged 24)
- Badge Number: 243
- Rank: 6-dan
- Teacher: Hiroto Kiritani (7-dan)
- Meijin class: Free
- Ryūō class: 6
- Notable students: Kōhei Hasebe

Websites
- JSA profile page

Takehiro Ōhira (大平 武洋, Ōhira Takehiro; born May 11, 1977) is a Japanese professional shogi player ranked 6-dan.

== Early life, amateur shogi and apprenticeship ==
Ōhira was born in Kita, Tokyo on May 11, 1977. When he was an elementary school fourth-grade student, he joined the Japan Shogi Association's training group system and eventually moved on to the association's apprentice school as a student of shogi professional Hiroto Kiritani at the rank of 6-kyū after winning the 15th Junior High School Student Meijin Tournament in 1990 as a first-grade junior high school student.

Ōhira was promoted to the rank of 1-dan in 1993 and obtained full professional status and the rank of 4-dan in April 2002 after winning the 30th 3-dan League (October 2001 – March 2002) with a record of 16 wins and 2 losses.

== Shogi professional ==
=== Promotion history ===
The promotion history for Ōhira is as follows.

- 6-kyū: 1990
- 1-dan: 1993
- 4-dan: April 1, 2002
- 5-dan: September 19, 2006
- 6-dan: January 8, 2016
