= Yūta Komori =

Japanese professional shogi player (born 1995)

- Native name: 古森悠太
- Born: August 20, 1995 (age 31)
- Hometown: Takatsuki

Career
- Achieved professional status: October 1, 2017 (aged 22)
- Badge number: 312
- Rank: 5-dan
- Teacher: Kenji Kobayashi (9-dan)
- Meijin class: C1
- Ryūō class: 6

Websites
- JSA profile page

Yūta Komori (古森 悠太, Komori Yūta; August 20, 1995) is a Japanese professional shogi player ranked 5-dan.

== Early life and apprenticeship ==
Komori was born on August 20, 1995, in Takatsuki, Osaka Prefecture. He learned how to play shogi from his father when he was a second-grade elementary school student.

In September 2008, Komori was accepted into the Japan Shogi Association (JSA) apprentice school under the guidance of shogi professional Kenji Kobayashi at the rank of 6-kyū. He was promoted to the rank of apprentice professional 3-dan in 2016, and obtained full professional status and the corresponding rank of 4-dan in October 2017 after finishing second in the 61st 3-dan League (April 2017 – September 2017) with a record of 12 wins and 6 losses.

== Shogi professional ==
=== Promotion history ===
The promotion for Komori is as follows:

- 6-kyū: September 2008
- 3-dan: October 2016
- 4-dan: October 1, 2017
- 5-dan: March 5, 2020

== Personal life ==
Komori is a graduate of Kobe University. He received his degree in economics from the school in the Spring of 2018.
