= Kewen =

Kewen is a given name and surname. Notable people with the name include:

== Given name ==
- Yuan Kewen, Chinese scholar and calligrapher, son of Yuan Shikai
- Kewen (footballer, born 2005), full name Kewen Andrade Campos, Brazilian footballer

== Surname ==
- Edward J. C. Kewen, American politician

== See also ==
- Lù Kèwén, the Chinese name of Kevin Rudd, Australian prime minister and diplomat
