= Kana Tsugihara =

Japanese actress, model, and idol

- Born: August 25, 1984 (age 41); Tokyo, Japan
- Occupations: Actress, model, idol

Kana Tsugihara (つぎはら かな) (born August 25, 1984, in Tokyo, Japan) is a former Japanese actress, model and idol who has appeared in various magazines and television shows.

She has body measurements of 87-60-88 cm, and stands 1.58m tall.

== Media appearances ==
=== Movies ===
- Second time live (2007, MC Tee) - Kyoko role
- Fight Flight, Vol.3 and The End of the World (2008, cheap production committee Fighting) - Corporate Ling Kisaragi (starring)
- Lived two second time (2008, MC Tee) - Kyoko role
- 3 live second time (2008, MC Tee)
- Grudge (2009, T-Joy) - Corporate Mutsumi
- 4 The Final live second time (2009, MC Tee) - Kyoko role

=== Original video ===
- Kitan ghost photography (2006, dot-com Fosaido) - Episode 1, "no pictures of the subject" about Kyoko Higashiyama

Wakaba

- Cherry Boys School (Years 2009, GP Museum Soft) - Asuka role Yagami (starring)

=== TV shows ===
- Girls On Film (MONDO21)
- Bombshell goddess (MONDO21)
- Beauty-H (Tokyo)
- Talk audition gravure (Fuji Television)
- Girl Swimsuit (Tokyo)
- Dream Vision (NTV)
- Kingdom Rank (TBS)
- ☆ Johnny Reviews (NTV)
- Tsu hunt (RajNTV)
- www (TV Yomiuri) - Regular
- Goddess of victory 3rdSTAGE (Chibaterebi) - guest appearance
- Goddotan (August 26, 2009 April 8, 2008 November 12, Tokyo)
- Puromoru (April 2009 - April 2010, E2 promo) - Regular
- SMAP (May 11, 2009, Kansai - Fuji TV) - Special Edition "± 12 the same year"
- Ariken (April 3, 2010, Tokyo)
- London Hearts (April 6, 2010, Asahi) - "SP Magic Mail simultaneous raids spring 2010 hottest entertainers!"
- Ichihachi (May 12, May 5, 2010, MBS)
- Jack 10 (May 19, 2010, NTV)
- Darwin's theory of evolution Beautiful Love (June 10, 2010 - September 30, NTV) Regular
- London Hearts (July 20, 2010, TV Asahi) - "ROUND4 someone want confrontation Body"
- Chestnut Cream & showbiz of saury (Japan) Grand Personal Information (November 5, 2010, Fuji TV)
- Decca Honma!? TV (November 24, 2010, Fuji TV)
- Beach Angels Yoron (March 26, 2011 BS-TBS)
- S dollar box tonight (October 11, 2011, Tokyo)

=== TV ===
- Psychic Detective Yakumo to 11 during the opening 10 episodes (2006, Tokyo) - Corporate Miki Sasaki
- Supplements I started feeling movement Episode 2 (2006, Fuji Television)
- Resident Kira (year 2007, TBS)
- Mr. Manna Cafe urban legend of the curse Comics (year 2008, BS-i)
- Team Spirit Girls (years 2008, BS-i)

=== Radio ===
- Tsu mix still Gocha! Yangyang Atsumare ~ ~ (2 May 2009 - 7 August 2010, MBS Radio)
- JBRpresents Pureraji (September 2009 - December, FM Inter-Wave, Inc. | InterFM)
- Tsu mix Gocha best! (August 2010 - MBS Radio)

=== Internet ===
- European Poker Tour 2007 (Gya)
- Sexy Magazine Yoshiharu Noda # 34 (GyaO)
- MIDTOWN TV Tuesday (date of October 1, GyaO 2007 - May 15)
- Tea Tsu !(GyaO jockey advertising, November 30, 2007)
- 24:00 adhesion talent! (GyaO Idol, ShowTime, February 2008)
- Teaching a narrow space!(there! Surprised broadcasters, 16 March 2008)
- @ Misty (gravure idol, June 26, 2009)

=== Other products ===
- Ultra-Scale Mini Cushion Cushion
- The following Kana Hara (2006, Tri-X)
- What next for the original calendar in 2007(2006, Tri-X)
- What next for the original 2008 Calendar (2007, Tri-X)
- Calendar year 2009 (2008, Tri-X)
- KIKS TYO x Kana Tsugihara "KIKS GIRLS" T-shirts (2010-2011)
