= Kōhei Hasebe (shogi) =

Japanese shogi player (born 1994)

- Native name: 長谷部浩平
- Born: April 15, 1994 (age 32)
- Hometown: Oyama, Tochigi

Career
- Achieved professional status: April 1, 2018 (aged 23)
- Badge number: 313
- Rank: 6-dan
- Teacher: Takehiro Ōhira (6-Dan)
- Meijin class: C2
- Ryūō class: 5

Websites
- JSA profile page

Kōhei Hasebe (長谷部 浩平, Hasebe Kōhei; April 15, 1994) is a Japanese professional shogi player ranked 6-dan.

== Early life and apprenticeship ==
Hasebe was born in Oyama, Tochigi on April 15, 1994. He learned how to play shogi from his father when he was about five years old.

In March 2007, Hasebe was accepted into the Japan Shogi Association (JSA) apprentice school at the rank of 6-kyū under the tutelage of shogi professional Takehiro Ōhira. He was promoted to the rank of apprentice professional 3-dan in 2016, and obtained full professional status and the corresponding rank of 4-dan in April 2018 tying for first with Takashi Ikenaga in the 62nd 3-dan League (October 2017 – March 2018) with a record of 14 wins and 4 losses.

== Shogi professional ==
=== Promotion history ===
The promotion history for Hasebe is as follows.

- 6-kyū: March 2007
- 3-dan: April 2016
- 4-dan: April 1, 2018
- 5-dan: October 13, 2022
- 6-dan: May 18, 2026
