= Chikage =

- Gender: Female

Origin
- Origin: Japanese
- Meaning: Different meanings depending on the kanji used

Chikage (written: 千景) is a feminine Japanese given name. Notable people with the name include:

- Chikage Awashima (淡島 千景; 1924–2012), Japanese actress
- Chikage Oogi (扇 千景; 1933–2023), Japanese actress and politician
- Chikage Tanaka (田中 千景; born 1973), Japanese speed skater
