= Saya Nakazawa =

Japanese shogi player

- Native name: 中澤沙耶
- Born: May 14, 1996 (age 29)
- Hometown: Ichinomiya, Aichi

Career
- Achieved professional status: April 1, 2015 (aged 18)
- Badge Number: W-53
- Rank: Women's 1-dan
- Teacher: Masataka Sugimoto (8-dan)

Websites
- JSA profile page

Saya Nakazawa (中澤 沙耶, Nakazawa Saya; born May 14, 1996) is a Japanese women's professional shogi player ranked 1-dan.

== Women's shogi professional ==
=== Promotion history ===
Nakazawa's promotion history is as follows:

- 2-kyū: April 1, 2015
- 1-kyū: June 20, 2015
- 1-dan: April 1, 2016

Note: All ranks are women's professional ranks.

=== Major titles and other championships ===
Nakazawa has yet to appear in a major title match, but she has won one official non-title women's professional shogi tournament.

== Personal life ==
Nakazawa graduated from the Department of Urban Science of Meijo University in 2018.
