= Yoshimune Sano =

Japanese basketball player

Yoshimune Sano 佐野吉宗
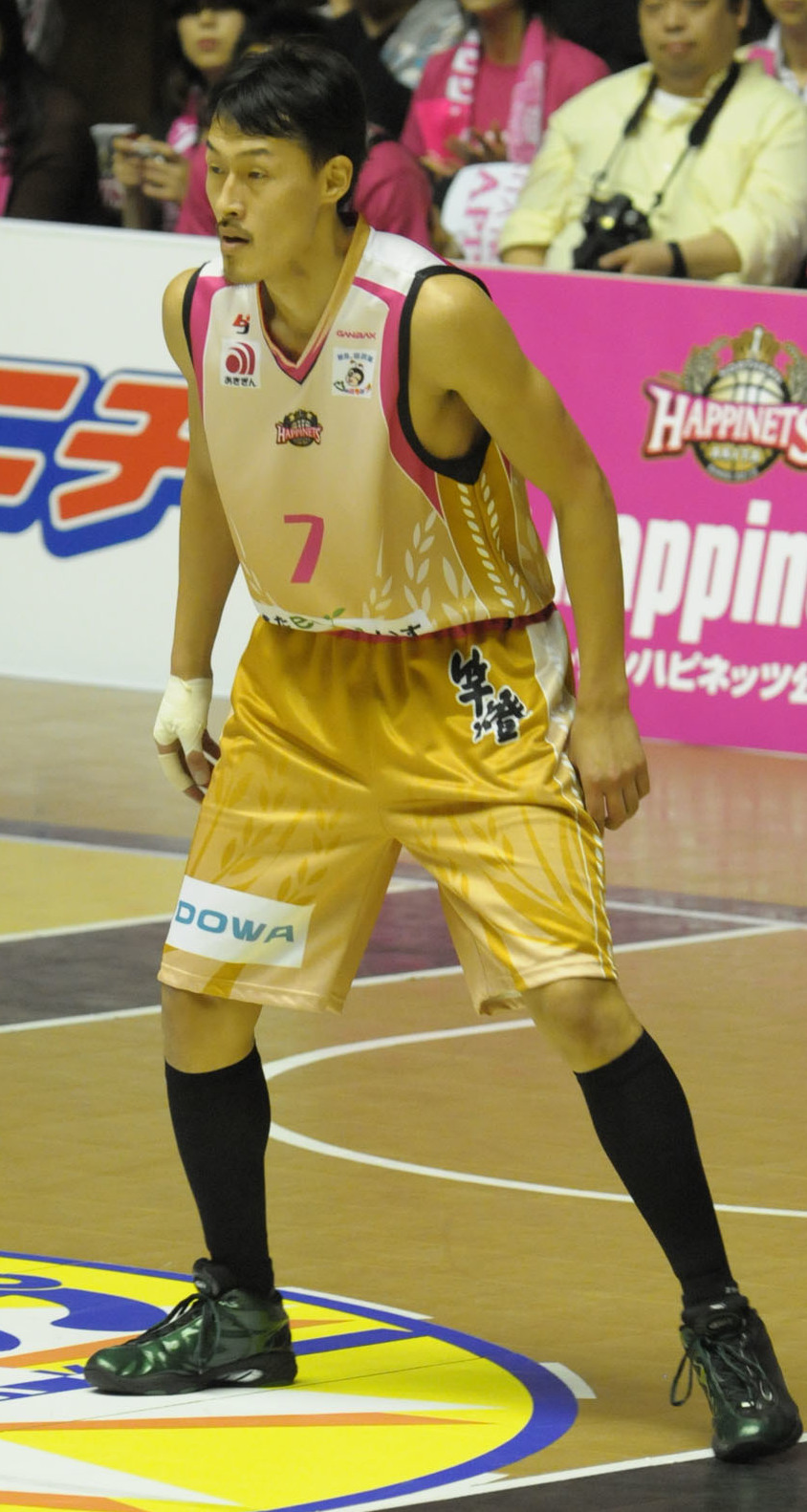
- Sano at Akita Prefectural Gymnasium

Personal information
- Born: April 30, 1979 (age 47) Fujinomiya, Shizuoka, Japan
- Listed height: 6 ft 8 in (2.03 m)
- Listed weight: 207 lb (94 kg)

Career information
- High school: Numazu Gakuen (Numazu, Shizuoka)
- College: Nihon University
- Playing career: 2002–2015
- Position: Center

Career history
- 2002-2006: Toyota Alvark
- 2006-2007: Hitachi SunRockers
- 2007-2008: Rera Kamuy Hokkaido
- 2008-2009: Ikai Red Chimps
- 2010: Red One
- 2011: Hamamatsu Higashimikawa Phoenix
- 2011-2014: Akita Northern Happinets
- 2014-2015: Rizing Fukuoka

Career highlights
- bj League Champions (2010-11)

Yoshimune Sano (born Yoshimune Kato, April 30, 1979) is a Japanese former professional basketball player who played for the Akita Northern Happinets of the bj League in Japan. He played college basketball for Nihon University.

== Career statistics ==
Legend
GP	Games played	GS	Games started	MPG	Minutes per game
FG%	Field goal percentage	3P%	3-point field goal percentage	FT%	Free throw percentage
RPG	Rebounds per game	APG	Assists per game	SPG	Steals per game
BPG	Blocks per game	PPG	Points per game	**Bold**	Career high

=== Regular season ===
Year	Team	GP	GS	MPG	FG%	3P%	FT%	RPG	APG	SPG	BPG	PPG
2007-08	Hokkaido	16		8.7	.333	.000	.667	1.2	0.1	0.1	0.1	1.8
2010-11	Hamamatsu	13	2	3.5	.000	.000	.250	0.6	0.2	0.0	0.0	0.1
2011-12	Akita	44	12	10.4	.607	.000	.459	1.6	0.5	0.1	0.1	1.2
2012-13	Akita	37	10	10.8	.467	.000	.467	1.8	0.1	0.3	0.1	0.9
2013-14	Akita	23	4	5.1	.667	.000	.500	0.4	0.2	0.1	0.0	0.4
2014-15	Fukuoka	38	18	11.7	.500	.000	.406	1.1	0.3	0.3	0.1	1.2
Career 2007-15		171		9.4	.476	.000	.467	1.3	0.3	0.2	0.1	1.0

=== Playoffs ===
Year	Team	GP	GS	MPG	FG%	3P%	FT%	RPG	APG	SPG	BPG	PPG
2010-11	Hamamatsu	3		3.3	.000	.000	.500	0.3	0.0	0.0	0.0	0.7
2013-14	Akita	2	0	2.00	.000	.000	.000	0.0	0.5	0	0	0
