= Mari Sano =

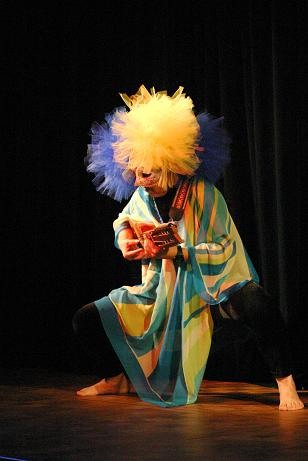
- Dance of the hummingbird

Background information
- Born: Mari Sano; June 17, 1968 (age 58); Seto, Japan.
- Occupations: Musician, performance artist, peace activist
- Instruments: charango, percussion, vocals
- Years active: 1990–present
- Label: AOZORAKOBO
- Website: http://sanomari.wixsite.com/marisano

Mari Sano (Aichi, Seto, b. 17 June 1968) is a Japanese artist and composer working in multiple media, including the charango, the ocarina, percussion and photography. She lives in Mexico and Argentina. She produced three albums From Beginning (1996), Latin Park (1999) and Friendship Musical (2008). Her compositions have received awards and cultural recognition in music, photography and performance.

== Early life ==
In her childhood, she lived in Mexico (1972–1976), Argentina (1978–1982) and Spain (1989–1992), absorbing Hispanic culture. In 1998 she began living in Argentina.

== Career ==
Her stage piece "Life of Hummingbird" was created from the Deer Dance (Ritual dancing celebrated by the Yaqui Indians and Mayos) entitled "Charango dancing / Dance of the hummingbird". During her experience in Mexico, in 1972, Sano met choreographer Amalia Hernández. Sano introduced these dance elements to her own work, strumming the charango and making specific sounds that she used in her choreography.

Her creation reached the stages around the world, including Argentina, Japan, Taiwan, Colombia, Ecuador, Venezuela, Costa Rica, Spain, Mexico and Cuba. It was sponsored by the Secretariat of Culture and embassies of Argentina, Mexico, Ecuador and Japan, in recognition of the important work in promoting activities that contribute to enriching culture and friendship.

She was invited at concerts, record material and cultural events by artists from Latin America (Symphony Orchestra of Venezuela, Eduardo Bergara Leumann, Liliana Belfiore, Jaime Torres, Carmina Cannavino, Horacio Lopez, Franco Luciani, Nuria Martinez, Eloisa Lopez, National Choir House of Ecuadorian Culture ) and numerous rock bands, Celtic and Circus (the Zurda, Violent Past, the Pakidermos, Axouxeres). She collaborated in music and production of various artistic projects, including documentary film Visions of Hiroshima, Zamba del Loro Mario and a dancing show.

== Discography ==
- 1996: Ichiban Ushirokara (from the beginning)
- 1999: Parque Latino (Latin Park)
- 2008: Amistad Musical (Friendship Musical)

== Filmography ==
- 2003 Music without border - ( Documentary of study for school ORT ) Dir.: Ezequier Hara Duck
- 2007 Chevere Caracas – Mari Sano artistic experience in Caracas ( Documentary ). Dir.: Julio Martinez
- 2008 Amistad del Colibri – Artistic creation with Ecuadorian Embassy in Argentina ( Documentary ). Dir.: Matias Repossi
- 2009 Danza of the hammingbird ( Live show ) Dir.: Jose Gili.
- 2009 Mari Sano dance of hammingbird - ( TV documentary ). Dir.: Yomiuri channel
- 2012 Zamba del Loro Mario - ( Documentary ). Dir.: Mari Sano.
- 2013 Haiku hammingbird - ( Video Dance ) . Dir.: Marcela Lizcano.
