= Masataka Sugimoto =

Japanese Shogi player (born 1968)

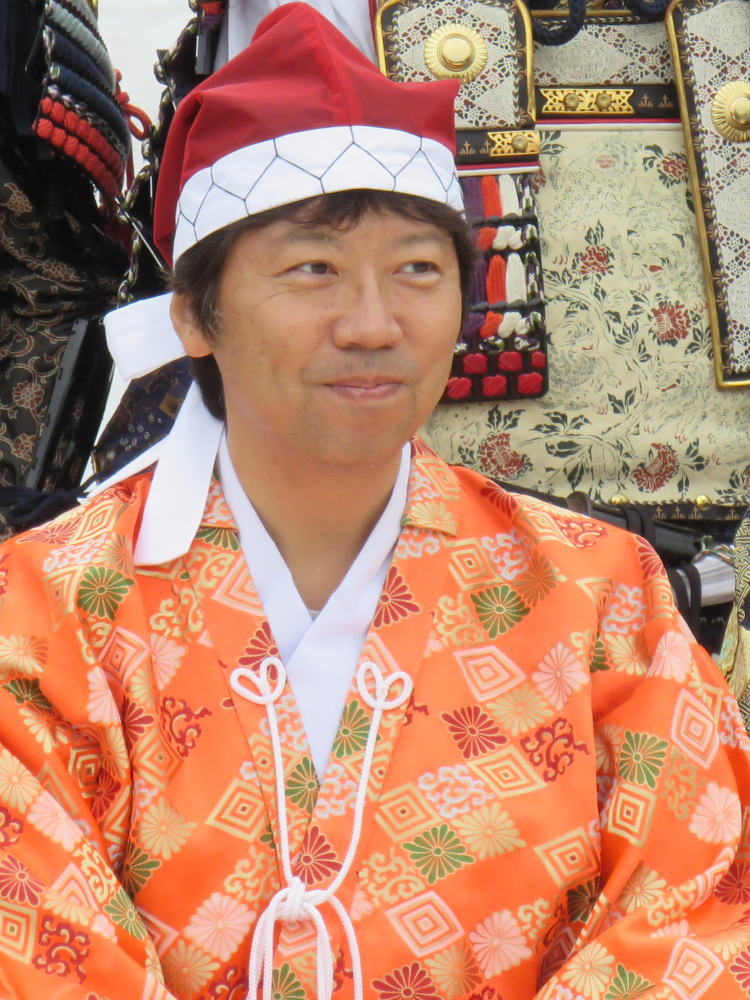
- Sugimoto at November 2019 human shogi event in Himeji, Japan.
- Native name: 杉本昌隆
- Born: November 13, 1968 (age 56)
- Hometown: Nagoya
- Nationality: Japanese

Career
- Achieved professional status: October 1, 1990 (aged 21)
- Badge Number: 197
- Rank: 8-dan
- Teacher: Susumu Itaya (9-dan)
- Meijin class: C1
- Ryūō class: 4
- Notable students: Sōta Fujii; Yūya Saitō; Io Murota; Saya Nakazawa; Aya Imai

Websites
- JSA profile page

Masataka Sugimoto (杉本 昌隆, Sugimoto Masataka; born November 13, 1968) is a Japanese professional shogi player ranked 8-dan. He is a former non-executive director of the Japan Shogi Association.

== Early life and apprenticeship ==
Sugimoto was born on November 13, 1968, in Nagoya, Japan. In 1980, he finished third in the 5th Elementary School Student Meijin Tournament and entered the Japan Shogi Association's apprentice school that same year at the rank 6-kyū under the guidance of shogi professional Susumu Itaya.

Sugimoto was promoted to the rank of 1-dan in 1985 before obtaining full professional status and the rank of 4-dan in October 1990 after finishing the 7th 3-dan League (April 1990 – September 1990) with a record of 13 wins and 5 losses.

== Shogi professional ==
Sugimoto became the 57th professional shogi player to win 600 official games when he defeated Satoru Sakaguchi in a preliminary round game of the 72nd Ōshō Tournament on January 28, 2022.

=== Promotion history ===
The promotion history for Sugimoto is as follows.

- 6-kyū: August 1980
- 1-dan: February 1985
- 4-dan: October 1, 1990
- 5-dan: December 6, 1995
- 6-dan: July 11, 2000
- 7-dan: February 10, 2006
- 8-dan: February 22, 2019

=== Awards and honors ===
Sugimoto received the Japan Shogi Association's "25 Years Service Award" in 2015 in recognition of being an active professional for twenty-five years. He received the Shogi Honor Award in January 2022 for winning 600 games since turning professional.

== JSA director ==
Sugimoto is a member of the Japan Shogi Association's board of directors. He was first elected to a two-year term as a non-executive director at the association's 63rd General Meeting in June 2012. He was elected to the board a second time as a non-executive director in June 2021 and re-elected to an additional two-year term in June 2023.
