= Azusa Kishimoto =

Japanese tarento and model (1985–2025)

- 岸本 梓
- Born: 20 March 1985; Kanagawa Prefecture, Japan
- Died: 24 February 2025 (aged 39)
- Other names: Azu-chan (あずちゃん); Azū (アズー)
- Occupations: Model; tarento; DJ; Singer
- Years active: 2000–2025
- Style: General modelling
- Height: 164 cm (5 ft 5 in)

Azusa Kishimoto (Japanese: 岸本 梓, Hepburn: Kishimoto Azusa; 20 March 1985 – 24 February 2025) was a Japanese tarento and model. She was born on 20 March 1985, and died of cancer on 24 February 2025, at the age of 39.

== Filmography ==
=== Television ===
Year	Title	Network	Notes	Ref.
	BS Style	NHK BS1, BS2, BS Hi-Vision	Presenter for BS programme guide; irregular terrestrial appearances	
2004	Zoom In!! Super	NTV		
2006	Cinderella Beauty	BS Asahi		
2008	Zoom In!! Saturday	NTV		

=== Radio ===
Year	Title	Network	Ref.
2007	Yamahan presents Music Salad From U-kari Studio	bayfm	
