= Yumi Kobayashi =

Japanese model (born 1988)

- Born: November 26, 1988 (age 37); Tokyo, Japan
- Other name: Yumi-chan
- Occupation: Fashion model
- Modeling information
- Height: 1.67 m (5 ft 6 in)
- Eye color: Black
- Agency: Burning Production, K.K.
- Website: www.webburning.com (in Japanese)

Yumi Kobayashi (小林 優美, Kobayashi Yumi; born November 26, 1988) is a female fashion model from Tokyo, Japan. She works for the show-business production Burning Production, K.K. (株式会社バーニングプロダクション) and previously worked for Platica Inc.

Her show-business name from July 2007 to March 2008 was Yumi Uno (宇野 優美).

== Biography ==
In 2002, Kobayashi debuted as an exclusive model of Loveberry, a fashion magazine for Japanese low-teen girls and published by Tokuma Shoten. She modeled for the magazine until 2005. In the next year, Kobayashi transferred to Face Network Co., Ltd. (株式会社フェイスネットワーク) and also debuted as a gravure idol. Then, in 2007, she took part in a model audition for the Kobe Collection, or simply, Kou-Kore. Kobayashi became a finalist but without any prize. Also in the same year, Kobayashi joined Miss Magazine (ミスマガジン) and became a semi-finalist, from which she solely won the GyaO Prize. Soon afterwards, on July 31, she renamed her family name from Kobayashi to Uno, which derives from the president and CEO of USEN Corporation, Yasuhide Uno (宇野康秀). On April 1, 2008, Platica Inc. was independent from Face Network Co., Ltd., subsequently Kobayashi got to belong to Platica Inc. and she renamed her family name again back to Kobayashi. In 2008, Kobayashi participated in a model audition of the Kobe Collection and became a finalist again; however, she did not obtain any prize. Also in Princess PINKY Audition (プリンセスPINKYオーディション) of a fashion magazine PINKY, she became a finalist but received no prize. In late 2008, Kobayashi was elected as the 23rd Asahi Beer Image Girl, on which she served until December 2009. Thereafter, on April 1, 2010, Kobayashi transferred to Burning Production, K.K.

She has attended the Tokyo Girls Collection twice as a model; i.e. 11th Tokyo Girls Collection of 2010 Autumn/Winter and 13th Tokyo Girls Collection of 2011 A/W.

== Bibliography ==
=== Magazines ===
- Loveberry, Tokuma Shoten 2001–, as an exclusive model from 2002 to 2005
- Scholar, Scholar Magazine 2008
- Weekly Playboy No.22, pp. 24–27, Shueisha 2010
- Weekly Young Jump No.49, pp. 439–443, Shueisha 2010
- Weekly Playboy No.47, pp. 95–111, Shueisha 2010
- Weekly Playboy No.7, p. 1 (cover) and pp. 5–12, Shueisha 2011
- Weekly Young Jump No.11, p. 1 (cover) and pp. 3–8, Shueisha 2011
- Weekly Young Jump No.26, pp. 431–435, Shueisha 2011

== Filmography ==
=== TV drama ===
- Misaki Number One!! (美咲ナンバーワン!!), Nippon Television 2011
- Shima-shima (シマシマ), TBS 2011

=== DVDs ===
1. Angel Kiss – Angel's Smile - (Angel Kiss ～天使の微笑み～), E-net Frontier 2006
2. Yumi Toiro (優美十色), GP Museum Soft 2007
3. Angel Kiss – Angel's Reunion - (Angel Kiss ～天使の再会～), Trico 2008
