= Saori Horii =

Japanese idol (born 1984)

Saori Horii (堀井沙織, Horii Saori, born August 9, 1984) nicknamed Saorin, is a female gravure idol (swimsuit/bikini model) of Japan. She is from Tokyo, and belongs to the show-business production Platica Inc., a subsidiary of Face Network Co., Ltd.

== Early life ==
She was born on 9 August 1984 in Tokyo, Japan

== Career ==
She is 162 cm tall. She is managed by Platica Inc.

When Saori worked as a promotional model, she was headhunted by Face Network Co., Ltd. and subsequently became an exclusive race queen of that company.

During her activities as a race queen, Saori was promoted to a gravure idol by the manager of Face Network's show business division.

In April 2006, she debuted in a men's magazine. Soon afterward, she appeared as a gravure idol in several magazines.

After January 2007, she released several DVDs. Her fifth DVD was Lovely Flower♥ was published.

Horii appeared on TV after 2007.

In April 2008, she signed with Platica Inc.

== Filmography ==
=== TV Programs ===
- Cream Nantoka (くりぃむナントカ), TV Asahi 2007
- Enta no Mikata! (エンタの味方!), TBS 2007-08
- Gravure no Bishojo (グラビアの美少女), MONDO21 2008

=== DVDs ===
- Saorin to Issho♥ - Nikkori Side - (さおりんといっしょ♥ ～にっこりサイド～), Sparkvision 2007
- Saorin to Issho♥ - Shittori Side - (さおりんといっしょ♥ ～しっとりサイド～), Sparkvision 2007
- Saorin LOVE♥ (さおりんLove♥), Take Shobo 2007
- Daisuki♥ (大好きっ♥), GRADIA 2007
- Lovely Flower♥, Shinyusha 2008
- Tokimeki Love♥ (ときめきLove♥), Trico 2008
