= Io Murota =

Japanese shogi player (born 1989)

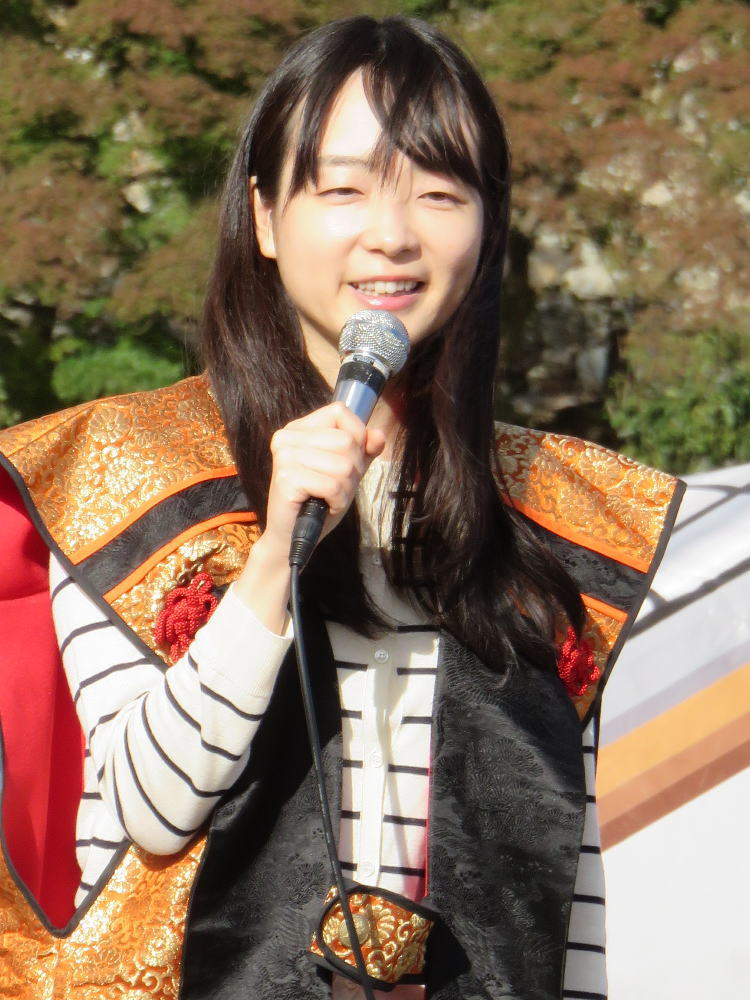
- Murota in 2018
- Native name: 室田伊緒
- Born: May 24, 1989 (age 36)
- Hometown: Kasugai, Aichi

Career
- Achieved professional status: October 1, 2005 (aged 16)
- Badge Number: W-35
- Rank: Women's 3-dan
- Teacher: Masataka Sugimoto (8-dan)

Websites
- JSA profile page

Io Murota (室田 伊緒, Murota Io; born May 24, 1989) is a Japanese women's professional shogi player ranked 3-dan.

== Women's shogi professional ==
=== Promotion history ===
Murata's promotion history is as follows:

- 2-kyū: October 1, 2005
- 1: 1-kyū: April 1, 2006
- 1-dan: April 1, 2008
- 2-dan: September 10, 2014
- 3-dan: July 13, 2024

Note: All ranks are women's professional ranks.

== Professional Shogi Players Group ==
Murota is a former vice-president of the Professional Shogi Players Group, serving in that capacity from June 2015 until the end of May 2017.

== Personal life ==
Murota married professional go player Yūta Iyama in 2012, but the couple divorced in 2015.In April 2022, she married then MBS announcer Shōta Morimoto and announced she would continue her professional shogi activities as "Iyo Morota".
