= Ryō Shimamoto =

Japanese professional shogi player

- Native name: 島本亮
- Born: May 5, 1980 (age 45)
- Hometown: Kobe

Career
- Achieved professional status: April 1, 2003 (aged 22)
- Badge Number: 247
- Rank: 6-dan
- Teacher: Kenji Kobayashi (9-dan)
- Meijin class: Free
- Ryūō class: 6

Websites
- JSA profile page

Ryō Shimamoto (島本 亮, Shimamoto Ryō; May 5, 1980) is a Japanese professional shogi player ranked 6-dan.

== Shogi professional ==
=== Promotion history ===
The promotion history for Shimamoto is as follows:

- 6-kyū: September 1993
- 1-dan: May 1997
- 4-dan: April 1, 2003
- 5-dan: July 12, 2011
- 6-dan: July 10, 2024
