= Seiya Tomita =

Japanese shogi player

- Native name: 冨田誠也
- Born: February 13, 1996 (age 29)
- Hometown: Sanda, Hyōgo, Japan

Career
- Achieved professional status: October 1, 2020 (aged 24)
- Badge Number: 325
- Rank: 5-dan
- Teacher: Kenji Kobayashi (9-dan)
- Meijin class: C1
- Ryūō class: 6

Websites
- JSA profile page

Seiya Tomita (冨田 誠也, Tomita Seiya; February 13, 1996) is a Japanese professional shogi player ranked 5-dan.

== Early life and apprenticeship ==
Tomita was born in Sanda, Hyōgo on February 13, 1996. He learned how to play shogi from his father when he was about five years old.

Tomita entered the Japan Shogi Association's apprentice school in September 2007 under the tutelage of shogi professional Kenji Kobayashi. He was promoted to the rank of apprentice professional 3-dan in April 2013 and obtained full professional status and the rank of 4-dan after finishing second in the 67th 3-dan League (April 2020 – September 2020) with a record of 14 wins and 4 losses.

== Shogi professional ==
=== Promotion history ===
The promotion history for Tomita is as follows.

- 6-kyū: September 2007
- 3-dan: April 2013
- 4-dan: October 1, 2020
- 5-dan: March 12, 2024

== Personal life ==
Tomita graduated from the College of Business Administration of Ritsumeikan University in 2018. He is the first graduate of the university to become a professional shogi player.
