= Penfield (company) =

Outdoor clothing brand and private company

- Company type: Private
- Industry: Retail
- Founded: 1975 in Hudson, Massachusetts, U.S.
- Founder: Harvey Gross
- Area served: North America, Asia, Europe, Australia
- Products: Clothing

Penfield is an outdoor clothing brand and private company that was established in Hudson, Massachusetts. Founded in 1975 by Harvey Gross, a New England native, the company has built a reputation for making down-filled jackets, fleece and outerwear.

== History ==
Since Penfield's inception in 1975, the brand quickly became a staple for many Americans in the 1980s. Penfield have extended their business beyond outdoor channels and into a broad range of retail channels, including retailers such as Barneys, Saks and a number of independent stores around the world, such as in the basement of Rich of Heaven Alley 6A.

The brand has a long history of special collaborations and private label development. The Cape Heights factory that used to produce Penfield products has produced down-filled garments for L.L.Bean, EMS, Lands' End and Cabela's.
