= Sarii Yoshizawa =

Japanese gravure idol (born 1985)

Sarii Yoshizawa (吉沢さりぃ, Yoshizawa Sarii, born June 25, 1985) is a Japanese gravure idol. She is from Kanagawa Pref. and interested in a takoyaki party and collecting pink items.

== Profile ==
- Nickname: Yoshizawa Gyu
- Profession: 'Gravure idol' (Japanese term: swimsuit/bikini model)
- Date of Birth: 25 June 1985
- Birthplace: Kanagawa Pref., Japan
- Height: 154 cm (5 feet and 0.6 inches)
- Measurements: B100 W60 H87 cm (B39.4 W23.6 H34.3 inches)
- Talent Agency: Unknown

== Filmography ==
=== Image DVDs ===
1. Boyon Boin (ボヨン・ボイン), Bunkasha 2005
2. Super Boyon Boin (スーパーボヨンボイン), Bunkasha 2006
3. Yureyure Tengoku (ユレユレ天国), Takeshobo 2006
4. Koisuru Hamichichi (恋するハミチチ), Out Vision 2007
5. Pai no Pai no Pai! (ぱいのPaiのパイ!), QH Eizo 2007
6. Hamichichi Zenkai! (ハミチチ全開!), Out Vision 2008
