= Ayaka Sayama =

Japanese gravure model (born 1993)

- 佐山 彩香
- Born: May 17, 1993 (age 33); Kanagawa Prefecture, Japan
- Other name: Sayama Kaoru Aya
- Occupation: Gravure model
- Years active: 2009–present
- Spouse: Unknown (m. 2024)
- Children: 1

Ayaka Sayama (佐山 彩香, Sayama Ayaka; born May 17, 1993) is a Japanese gravure idol from Kanagawa Prefecture.

== Career ==
Important releases include:

- Koh-Boh vol. 9 Mook (Magazine-book) series with DVD (2009, December 3, Kaiōsha (Bunkasha)) ISBN 479646025X ISBN 978-4796460255
- 1st DVD "PURE SMILE" (November 20, 2009, Takeshobo)
- 1st Photo "AYA" (2009, October 24, Saibunkan)
- Young Magazine (2009 release on September 28)
- Sabra (2009, December 25)
- @misty (2009, August 28)

== Personal life ==
In March 2024, Sayama announced that she had gotten married, later in August she announced that was expecting her first child. In December, she announced the birth of her first child, a daughter, born November 29, 2024.

== Media ==
TV appearances include:

- Zenryokuzaka (Full-speed Slope) (July 27, 2010 Aug 4.24 Sun, TV Asahi)
- God-tongue (September 22, 2010, TV Tokyo) - "Geinoukai Kirejo Jyuku (The Corrently Snapping Seminar for the Idol-talent Girls)" vol. 4
- Rank Oukoku (Kingdom of Ranking) (2010, December 4, TBS)

== Works ==
DVDs

	Title	Date
1	Pure smile	November 20, 2009
2	Parasol	February 26, 2010
3	100% freshly squeezed kyu and "raw" ♥ Gokkun the Kaori Aya	May 17, 2010
4	Angel devil	August 20, 2010
5	Aya Color	8 December 2010
6	17 teen sweetheart miracle ~ ~ Sadness	March 11, 2011
7	Doki girl!	June 20, 2011
8	Aya ♥ Chu	September 24, 2011

Photo albums

	Title	Date	Publisher	ISBN
1	AYA ―Sayama Kaoru Aya 1st. Photos	December 24, 2009	Saibunkan	ISBN 978-4-7756-0442-7
2	Vanilla Peach Whip	June 27, 2010	Wani Books	ISBN 978-4-8470-4280-5
3	CANDY GIRL	November 25, 2010	Shogakukan	ISBN 978-4-09-103001-6

== See also ==
- List of Japanese gravure idols
