= Natsume Sano =

Japanese gravure idol

Natsume Sano (佐野 夏芽, Sano Natsume; born February 14, 1985) is a former Japanese gravure idol, and female talent. She is from Tokyo, formerly belongs to the show-business production 'Metal Box'. Her nickname is 'Burin' (means a piggie), derives from her hobby collecting pig goods. She is deeply interested in Feng shui.

== Profile ==
- Nickname: Burin
- Profession: Actress and 'gravure idol' (Japanese term: swimsuit/bikini model)
- Date of Birth: 14 February 1985
- Birthplace: Tokyo, Japan
- Height: 155 cm (5 feet and 1.0 inch)
- Measurements: B86 W58 H84 cm (B33.9 W22.8 H33.1 inches)
- Talent Agency: Metal Box

== Filmography ==
=== TV Programs ===
- NANDA!? (TV Asahi)
- 着信 -Live television- (TV Tokyo)
- 三竹占い (TV Asahi)
- ランク王国SP (TBS)
- あきと由佳のIdol Park 2時間SP (CSエンタ371)
- パオパオ アソビ★クリエイターズ (BS Nippon)
- ドスペ2「恋のエプロン 新人タレント料理下克上バトル」 (TV Asahi)
- 白黒アンジャッシュ (Chiba Television)
- Xenos (TV Tokyo)

=== Radio Program(s) ===
- nemu RING RING (September 9, 2005; J-WAVE)

=== sunday ===
- すくらんぶる･ハーツ (2004)
- 殺人峰 キラー･ビー (2005)
- まいっちんぐマチコ!ビギンズ (2005)

=== Videos & DVDs ===
- Sexy GRAND PRIX, 2004 Mare
- Dream Girl, 2004 G.O.T.
- Pure Smile, 2004 Takeshobo
- Peace!, 2005 For-side.com Co., Ltd.
- 白黒アンジャッシュ, 2005 Pony Canyon Inc.
- なつめかん, 2005 Gakken / Sony Music Distribution Inc.
- まいっちんぐマチコ!ビギンズ, 2005 King Records
- 夏芽のアルバイト, 2005 For-side.com Co., Ltd.
- D-Splash! 佐野夏芽, 2006 King Records
- ナツメイロ, 2006 VAP
- パイなつプルン, 2006 Japan Home Video (JHV)

== Bibliography ==
=== Magazine ===
1. ZA·BEST MAGAZINE ORIGINAL（AUGUST 2005、KK BEST SELLERS, COVER GIRL

=== Photobooks ===
==== Digital ====
1. Girl's Minute, 2003 LEVEL 4
2. SEXY PRIDE, 2003 LEVEL 4
3. SHIZUKU (Drops), 2004 LEVEL 4
4. Honesty, 2004 LEVEL 4
5. Natsume Sano Digital Photobook (佐野夏芽デジタル写真集), 2006 @misty
6. Natsume no Arbeit (夏芽のアルバイト / Natsume's Part-time Job), 2006 For-side.com
7. Painatsupurun (パイなつプルン / Natsume's Breasts Move up and down), 2006 Line Communications

==== Normal (Paper) ====
1. Natsumekan (ナツメカン / Natsume & a Chinese Citron), Gakken 2005
2. Natsumeron (なつメロン / Natsume & a Melon), Kodansha 2005
3. OtoNatsume (オトナツメ / Matured Natsume), East Press 2006
4. Natsu-mail (なつめーる), Wani Books 2008

== Others ==
- Something ELse's Single "1M" jacket picture, 2003
- PlayStation 2 & Xbox "Red Dead Revolver" image girl, 2005 Capcom
- PlayStation Portable "Metal Gear Acid", 2005 Konami
- 'HOT☆FANTASY ODAIBA 2005' image character "Densha Girls", 2005
