= Chiaki Kyan =

- 喜屋武ちあき
- Born: March 13, 1984 (age 41); Saitama Prefecture, Japan
- Occupations: Model; singer
- Musical career
- Genres: J-pop
- Labels: Teichiku Records

Chiaki Kyan (喜屋武ちあき, Kyan Chiaki; born March 13, 1984) is a Japanese tarento, master of ceremonies, yoga instructor, lyricist, and former gravure idol. She is from Saitama. She was a member of Japanese pop music groups Nakano Fujoshi Sisters and Fudanjuku.

== Filmography ==
=== Videos & DVDs ===
- Pure Smile Chiaki Kyan, Takeshobo (2003)
- Can Can! (2004)
- Gachinko Suie Battle Taikai (ガチンコ水泳・バトル大会) (2004)
- Love Lovery (2005)
- Hajimete no Hanko (はじめての反抗) (2005)
- Matatabi Pu (またたびぷぅ) (2006)
- Pleasure Kiss (2006)
- Chiaki Kyan I Can!!! (2006)

== Bibliography ==
=== Photobooks ===
- Candy, Saibunkan 2003

=== Magazines ===
- Kyan-tastic World (きゃんたすてぃっくわーるど), Gamelabo
- Tech Honey is in Special Training now (テックハニーのただいま特訓中), Tech Research Institute
