= Risa Shimamoto =

Japanese gravure idol

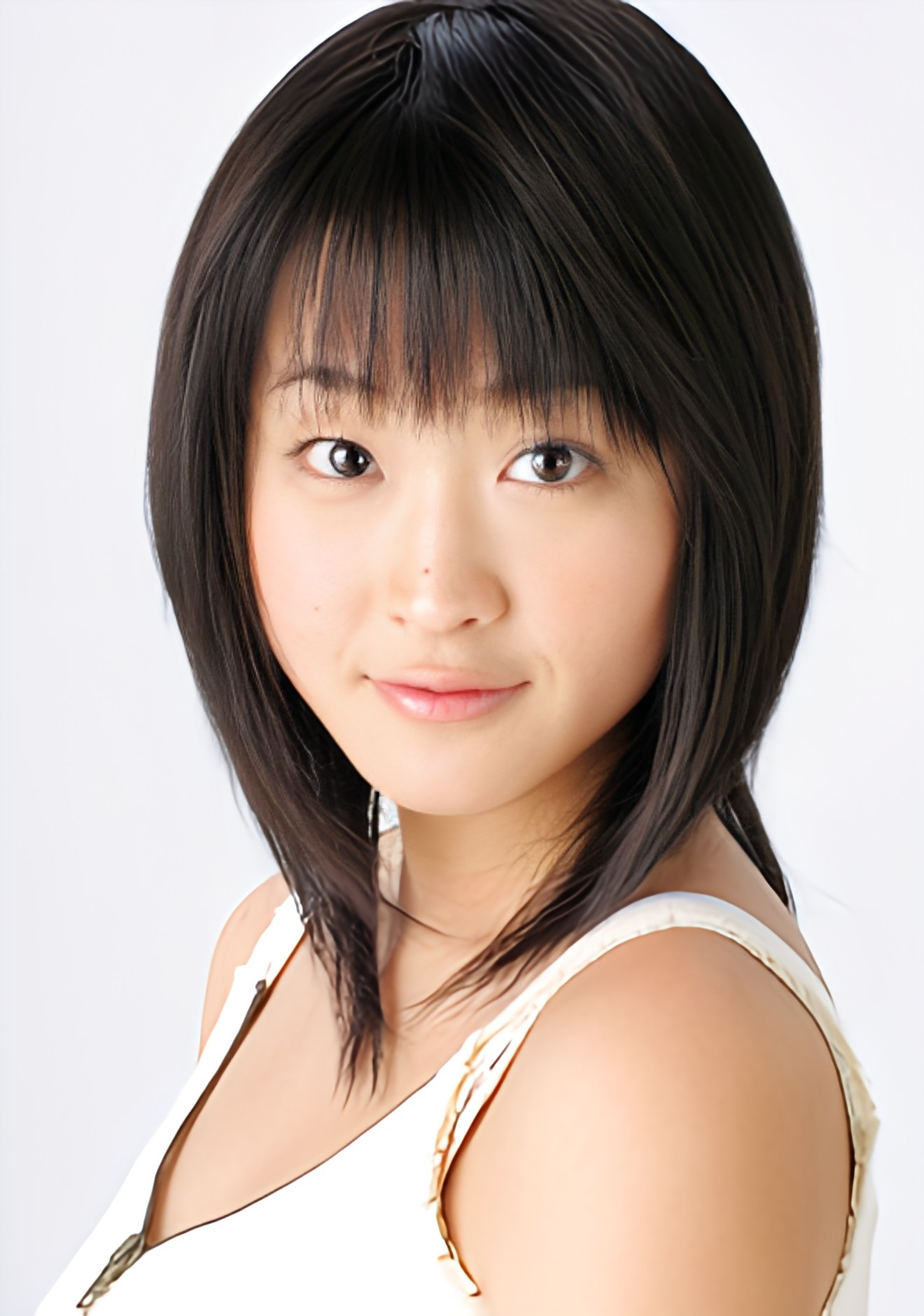
- Born: August 29, 1987 (age 38); Tokyo, Japan
- Other names: Richa (alternately, Ri-cha or Lhicha)
- Height: 1.57 m (5 ft 2 in)

Risa Shimamoto (島本里沙, Shimamoto Risa; born August 29, 1987) is a Japanese gravure idol, belonging to the show-business production Plaisir, subsequently ACE.

== Activities ==
=== TV Programs ===
- Mizugi Shojo (水着少女), TV Tokyo
- Tokyo Biyu (東京美優), TV Tokyo

=== DVDs ===
- Pearl, Vega Factory 2003
- Pure Smile Risa Shimamoto, Takeshobo 2004
- Sweet Milk, Line Communications 2004
- Jonetsu (情熱), E-net Fronteer 2004
- Milk Shake, Line Communications 2005
- Muku -innocent world- (無垢 -i.w.-), GP Museum Soft 2005
- Mizugi Samurai (水着サムライ), GP Museum Soft 2005
- LHICHA de GO, E-net Fronteer 2005

== Bibliography ==
=== Photo books ===
- Ichigo Juice (15果実), Bauhaus 2003
- Strawberry (ストロベリー), Angel-X - digital
- RI-CHA, Saibunkan 2004
- girl, Takeshobo 2004
- Fushigina Kuni no Risa (不思議な国のリサ), Bauhaus 2005
- Angel Collection Vol.16 Risa Shimamoto - digital
- Risa Shimamoto Digital Photo Book (島本里沙デジタル写真集)
- Risa Shimamoto Digital Photo Book Part 2 (島本里沙デジタル写真集 Part 2)

=== Serial essays ===
- KISSUI, Eichi Publishing
  - Japo-richa Gakushucho: Risa Shimamoto's Dokidoki Shakaika Kengaku Report
- e-ONNA, G.O.T.
  - Richa's Happy Life: Risa Shimamoto Whole Diary for a Month
