= Azusa Togashi =

Gravure idol

Azusa Togashi とがし あずさ^{?} 富樫 あずさ^{?}
- Born: 富樫 あずさ^{?}(Togashi Azusa); December 12, 1990 (age 35); Saitama Prefecture, Japan
- Years active: 2008 - Present
- Modeling information
- Height: 1.62 m (5 ft 4 in)
- Agency: アーティストハウス・ピラミッド^{?} (Artist-house Pyramid inc.)
- Website: https://ameblo.jp/togashi-azusa/

Azusa Togashi (富樫あずさ, Togashi Azusa; born December 12, 1990) is a Japanese gravure idol.

== Filmography ==
=== TV series ===
- Kudamaki hachibe (くだまき八兵衛) TV Tokyo February 3, 2011
