= Shogi notation =

Notation system for Shogi

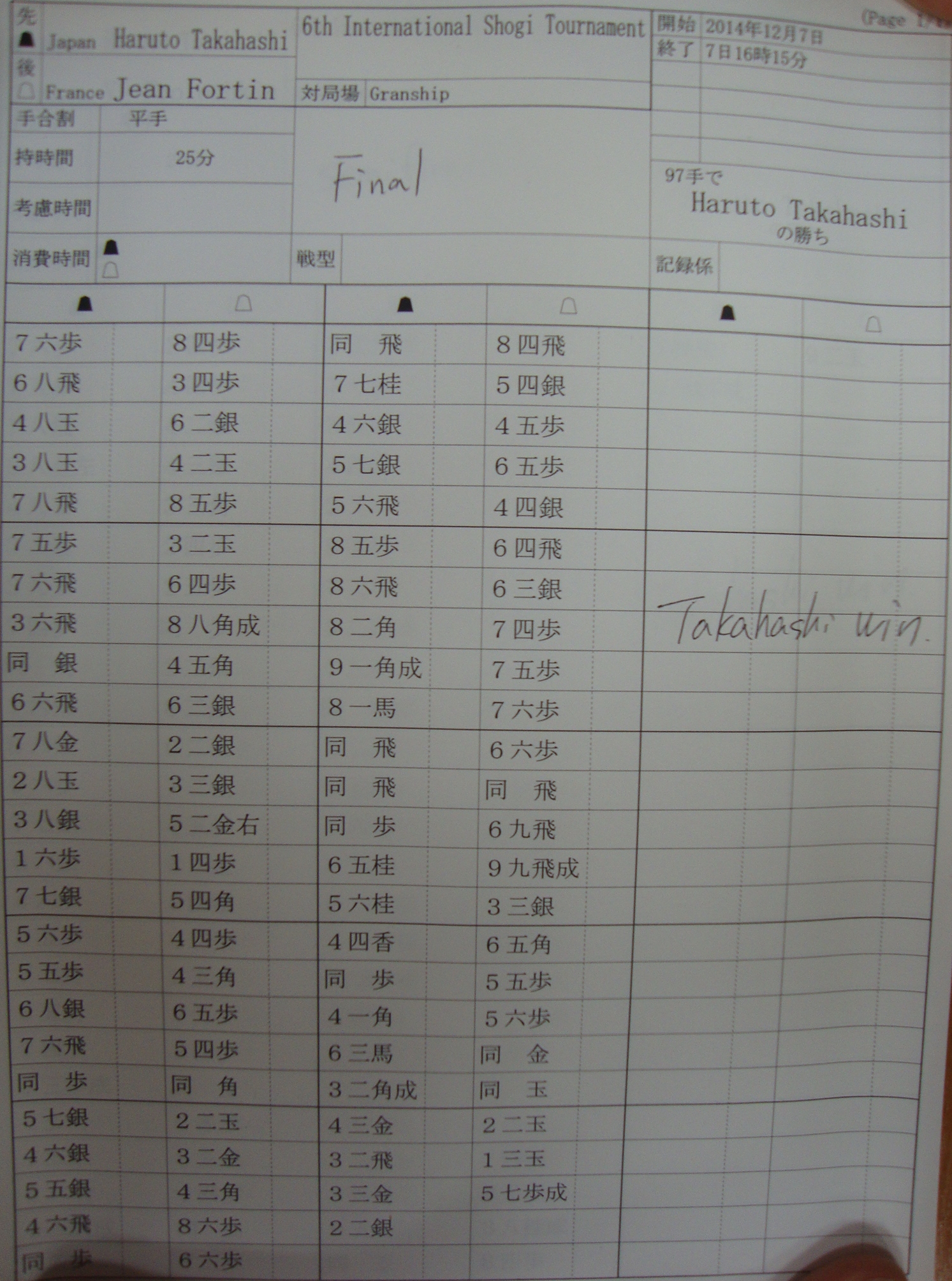
Game record of a shogi game

Shogi notation is the set of various abbreviatory notational systems used to describe the piece movements of a shogi game record or the positions of pieces on a shogi board.

A record of an abstract strategy board game such as shogi is called kifu (棋譜) in Japanese.

== Recording moves ==
=== Western notation ===
The system used in English language texts to express shogi moves was established by George Hodges and Glyndon Townhill in 1976 by the second issue of Shogi magazine. (Note: The notation system used by Hodges in the first issue of Shogi differs in a few aspects. Rather than indicate the destination square coordinates in captures, the piece being captured was indicated. For example, PxP indicated 'pawn captures pawn.' In ambiguity resolution, the origin square was enclosed in parentheses. For example, S(3c)-2b instead of S3c-2b. Moreover, since captures were notated with the captured piece, ambiguity resolution is required when multiple pieces of the same type are possible. Therefore, RxP(2f) or RxP(1e) would be required as the RxP notation would be ambiguous. Finally, promoted pieces were indicated with + suffixed to the piece initial enclosed in parentheses. For example, R(+)-7h instead of +R-7h. Changes were made to the first system in order to make it simpler and to avoid notation strings which were felt to be 'clumsy'. The first system also overlooked the need for an unpromotion indication.) A slightly modified version was used in Hosking (1996). It is derived from the algebraic notation used for chess, but differs in several respects. A typical move might be notated P86 (Hosking) or P-8f (Hodges). The notation format has the following 5 part structure:

1	2	3	4	5
piece	(origin)	movement	destination	(promotion)

An example using all 5 parts is S72x83+ or S7bx8c+. All parts are obligatory except for the origin and promotion parts. (Thus, most notation strings only contain 3 parts.) The origin part is only indicated when needed to resolve ambiguity. The promotion part is only needed when there is the possibility of promotion.

Western notation is not used in Japanese language texts, as it is no more concise than traditional notation with Japanese characters (kanji) and two ciphers which originated in the Edo period.

==== Piece ====
The first letter represents the piece moved. For instance, P is for Pawn. Below are the abbreviations used.

Abbreviation	English Term	Japanese
P	pawn	歩
L	lance	香
N	knight	桂
S	silver	銀
G	gold	金
B	bishop	角
R	rook	飛
K	king	玉/王

Promoted pieces are indicated by a + preceding the letter. For example, +P is a promoted pawn (と tokin), +R is a promoted rook (that is, a dragon 龍).

Some Japanese websites (such as 81Dojo) and Japanese authors use two different abbreviations for the promoted rook and promoted bishop in a way more similar to Japanese notation. Thus, D (for dragon) instead of +R and H (for horse) instead of +B. Additionally, a promoted pawn can be encountered as T (for tokin) instead of +P.

==== Ambiguity resolution: Origin coordinates ====
In cases where the moving piece is ambiguous, the starting square is added after the letter for the piece but before the movement indication.

For example, in diagrams below, Black has three golds which can move to square 78. Thus, simply notating G-78 is not enough to indicate the move. The three possible moves are distinguished via the origin specification as G77-78, G68-78, or G79-78.

Ambiguity Resolution
☖ pieces in hand: –

9	8	7	6	5	4	3	2	1
									1
									2
									3
									4
									5
									6
		金							7
			金						8
		金							9

☗ pieces in hand: –
start position
Ambiguity Resolution
☖ pieces in hand: –

9	8	7	6	5	4	3	2	1
									1
									2
									3
									4
									5
									6
									7
		金	金						8
		金							9

☗ pieces in hand: –
G77-78
Ambiguity Resolution
☖ pieces in hand: –

9	8	7	6	5	4	3	2	1
									1
									2
									3
									4
									5
									6
		金							7
		金							8
		金							9

☗ pieces in hand: –
G68-78
Ambiguity Resolution
☖ pieces in hand: –

9	8	7	6	5	4	3	2	1
									1
									2
									3
									4
									5
									6
		金							7
		金	金						8
									9

☗ pieces in hand: –
G79-78

==== Movement type ====
Following the abbreviation for the piece is a symbol for the type of move. There are 3 different indications:

Notation Symbol	Movement Type
-	simple movement
x	capture (opponent's piece)
* or ’	drop (your own piece)

As examples, P-24 indicates moving one's pawn to the 2d square (without capture), Px24 indicates moving one's pawn to the 24 square and capturing the opponent's piece that was on 24, and P*24 indicates dropping one's pawn in hand to the previously empty 24 square. (Note the x indication is a significant departure from Japanese notation, which has no way of signaling whether a piece was captured.)

There is some variation for the drop symbol. A * (asterisk) is often used, but some books (e.g. Hosking (1996) use a ’ (apostrophe) instead. Thus, Hosking B’56 is equivalent to Hodges B*5f. (Note: For comparison, the chess variant crazyhouse uses yet another symbol for dropped piece notation: the @ symbol.)

The simple movement indication (the hyphen -) is not used by Hosking (1996) who does not use a movement symbol. Thus, Hosking P26 is equivalent to Hodges P-2f.

==== Destination coordinates ====
After the movement piece indication is the square on which the piece lands. This is indicated by a numeral for the file (1–9) and the rank (1–9), with 11 being the top right corner from Black's perspective and 99 being the bottom left corner. This is based on Japanese notation conventions.

Hosking differs from Hodges in that Hosking uses numerals for the rank notation whereas Hodges uses letters (a–i) for the rank.

==== Promotion status ====
If a move entitles the player to promote, then a + is added to the end if the promotion was taken or an = if it was declined. For example, Nx73= indicates an unpromoted knight capturing on 73 without promoting while Nx73+ indicates an unpromoted knight capturing on 73 and promoting. The promotion status is always omitted in situations where promotion is not possible. When promotion is possible, then the promotion status is obligatorily notated.

==== Other conventions ====
Game moves in western notation are always numbered (unlike Japanese game records). Additionally, what is numbered are pairs of two moves – the first move by Black, the second by White – instead of numbering each move by each player. This also differs from the Japanese system. For instance, three pairs of moves (or six individual moves) are numbered as 1.P-76 P-34 2.P-26 P-44 3.S-48 S-32. However, in the British Shogi magazine of the 1970s and 1980s, the pair number convention was not used for tsumeshogi problems, in which case the each player's move is number just as in the Japanese notation conventions.

Following western chess conventions, omitted moves are indicated with an ... ellipsis. As a consequence of the way moves are numbered in the western system, all moves by White are notated with an ellipsis prefix in texts. For example, ...P-55 indicates a move by White while P-55 indicates a move by Black. In handicap games, White plays first, so Black's first move is replaced by an ellipsis. For example, 1...G-32 2.P-76 G-72.

Unlike western chess, game states like check or checkmate are not typically notated. However, the use of question marks and exclamation points to indicate questionable and good moves, respectively, are occasionally used.

=== Japanese notation ===
Japanese notation (shown on the left, listed vertically) accompanying a 15-move checkmate (tsume) problem. Note the lack of numbered moves and the lack of both explicit dropped piece notation and capture notation. From the book 詰むや詰まざるや (Tsumu ya tsumazaru ya) (1975) by 伊藤宗看 (Sōkan Itō) [1706–1761], a shogi Meijin of the Edo period, and 門脇芳雄 (Yoshio Kadowaki).

The earliest way to indicate game records in Japan during the Edo period was to use descriptive sentences such as Open the bishop's diagonal, push the rook's pawn, close the bishop's diagonal and the like. Soon afterward, a notational system was developed which is mostly the same as what is used in the present day in Japan.

==== Current standard ====
In Japanese notation, the notation string has the following five-part format:

1	2	3	4	5
(player side)	destination	piece	(movement)	(promotion)

A typical move is indicated like ８六歩 (equivalent to western P-86). An example that uses all five parts is ☗８三銀引成 (which could be either S72-83+ or S72x83+ in western notation). The player's side information is optional and the movement and promotion indications are only used in order to resolve ambiguity.

===== Player's side =====
It is common for the White (gote) and Black (sente) player to be indicated at the beginning of the notation string with either black and white triangles (▲/△) or shogi-piece-shaped pentagons (☗/☖), such as ▲７六歩△３四歩▲２六歩△３二金 or ☗７六歩☖３四歩☗２六歩☖３二金. However, this is not obligatory: several books notate shogi moves without explicit indication of which player is making the moves. (See the adjacent image for an example.) In such cases, knowing which player the move refers to can be determined by the context in the book. This white/black convention is more common when the moves are not numbered (which is also optional to notate).

===== Destination coordinates =====
For the board's coordinates, the file is indicated with an Arabic numeral followed by the rank indicated with a Japanese numeral (instead of an Arabic number or letter like in the western system). For example, square 23 in Japanese notation is ２三.

Japanese numeral	Japanese pronunciation	Arabic equivalent
一	ichi	１
二	ni	２
三	san	３
四	yon	４
五	go	５
六	roku	６
七	nana	７
八	hachi	８
九	kyū	９
同	dō or onajiku	same

Earlier (for instance, in the Edo period), only Japanese numerals were used for both file and rank coordinate.

There is also an abbreviatory convention: when a piece moves to the same coordinates as the previous move's piece (as in a capture), the position is simply indicated with 同 (which is pronounced dō or onajiku) instead of the file-rank coordinate numbers. For example, if Black's pawn moved to a square in which White's pawn captured Black's pawn and then both players' bishops recaptured followed by a rook recapture, this could be notated as ☗２四歩 ☖同歩 ☗同角 ☖同角 ☗同飛 which would be equivalent to the western notation sequence 1.P-24 Px24 2.Bx24 Bx24 3.Rx24. 同 always implies a capture (although not all captures will use 同, of course). In some cases where the coordinates may be forgotten by the reader (for instance, if its antecedent is separated by a page turn or several paragraphs of text), then the number coordinates will precede 同 to aid the reader like this: ☖２四同歩. An alternate symbol 仝 is used instead of 同 in older books. (Note: The 仝 character is also sometimes used as an abbreviatory symbol for a promoted lance. See Shogi§Equipment.)

It is also possible to encounter Arabic numerals for both the file and rank coordinates, such as ☗２４歩 instead of ☗２四歩.

Also, since Japanese is often written vertically from top to bottom, the notation may be written vertically as well with the top number indicating the file and rank number below the file number. Finally, in older books of the Edo period, the notation may be written from right to left (as is the case with traditional vertical writing) even when the notation is written horizontally. However, this older practice is not used in the modern period, where horizontally writing is read from left to right following European language traditions. (See the 1839 game record image below for such an example.)

===== Piece =====
Pieces are indicated with kanji (instead of letters as in the western system). The piece's kanji follows the piece's board coordinates. The following symbols are used.

Japanese	Western	Japanese	Western
歩	P	と	+P
香	L	成香	+L
桂	N	成桂	+N
銀	S	成銀	+S
角	B	馬	+B
飛	R	龍 or 竜	+R
金	G	玉	K

Promoted pieces are indicated with a 成 prefix except for the promoted pawn, promoted bishop, and promoted rook, which are と, 馬, 龍, respectively.

The character for dragon 龍 can also be encountered as its shinjitai form 竜 as well.

兵 is used instead of 歩 in some older texts.

In tsumeshogi, the character 合 is used essentially as a variable that represents a piece of any value. It is used to indicate to an interposing piece (of any kind) that is placed between the king and the opponent's checking piece.

===== Ambiguity resolution: Movement description =====
When there is ambiguity in piece movement, there is a complex system of movement description using the symbols below. The movement descriptors consist of (a) a dropped piece indicator, (b) movement indicators, and (c) relative piece origin indicators.

Movement notation	Japanese Pronunciation	Meaning
打	utsu	dropped
上	agaru	upward
引	hiku	downward
寄	yoru	horizontally
直	sugu	vertical forward (gold/silver only)
行 or 入		upward (dragon/horse only; rare)

Piece origin notation	Japanese Pronunciation	Meaning
右	migi	right-hand side (going leftwards)
左	hidari	left-hand side (going rightwards)

The symbol for a dropped piece is 打 following the piece's character. In the usual course of a game, most dropped pieces will probably be unambiguous. In these unambiguous cases, explicit notation for the dropped piece is not required and usually omitted (unlike in western notation where the drop notation is obligatory). For example, a western notation such as P*23 will be notated simply as ２三歩 instead of ２三歩打. In other situations, there is a possibility that either a piece that is already in play on the board can move to a certain square or a piece of the same kind that is held in hand can be dropped to that square. In this case, when the piece on the board moves to that square, the notation simply notates the move as usual with no drop indication. However, when the piece in hand is dropped to that location, then the drop indication must be present in the notation in order to resolve the ambiguity. In other words, 打 is only used when the following two conditions are met: (i) a piece is dropped and (ii) there is ambiguity with another piece on the board.

For ambiguity resolution with pieces on the board, the main notation symbols are 引 for downward movement, 寄 for horizontal movement, and 上 for upward movement. Note that these three indicators describe movement toward their destination square.

In the example below, three golds can move to the ７八 square. The gold that originates on ７七 and moves down is notated as ７八金引 (= G77-78). The other two possibilities are notated as ７八金寄 (= G68-78) and ７八金上 (= G79-78).

Ambiguity resolution
☖ pieces in hand: –

9	8	7	6	5	4	3	2	1
									1
									2
									3
									4
									5
									6
		金							7
			金						8
		金							9

☗ pieces in hand: –
start position
Ambiguity resolution: 引
☖ pieces in hand: –

9	8	7	6	5	4	3	2	1
									1
									2
									3
									4
									5
									6
									7
		金	金						8
		金							9

☗ pieces in hand: –
７八金引
Ambiguity resolution: 寄
☖ pieces in hand: –

9	8	7	6	5	4	3	2	1
									1
									2
									3
									4
									5
									6
		金							7
		金							8
		金							9

☗ pieces in hand: –
７八金寄
Ambiguity resolution: 上
☖ pieces in hand: –

9	8	7	6	5	4	3	2	1
									1
									2
									3
									4
									5
									6
		金							7
		金	金						8
									9

☗ pieces in hand: –
７八金上

The 引 and 上 indicate downward and upward movement, respectively, that can be both vertical as well as diagonal.

Ambiguity resolution
☖ pieces in hand: –

9	8	7	6	5	4	3	2	1
									1
									2
									3
					角				4
									5
									6
									7
	角								8
									9

☗ pieces in hand: –
start position
Ambiguity resolution: 引
☖ pieces in hand: –

9	8	7	6	5	4	3	2	1
									1
									2
									3
									4
									5
			角						6
									7
	角								8
									9

☗ pieces in hand: –
６六角引
Ambiguity resolution: 上
☖ pieces in hand: –

9	8	7	6	5	4	3	2	1
									1
									2
									3
					角				4
									5
			角						6
									7
									8
									9

☗ pieces in hand: –
６六角上

Unofficially, in some literature there exist two alternate symbols that are used instead of 上: 行 and 入. However, these alternate symbols are reserved for indicating only the two most powerful promoted dragon 龍 and horse 馬 pieces. Thus, ５五龍行 or ５五龍入 instead of ５五龍上, but not ５五金行 or ５五金入.

In certain situations, an indication of movement toward the destination square (that is, with 引, 寄, 上) is not sufficient to resolve ambiguity. In these cases, the origin square of the piece is notated with a relative positional indicator. These are 右 for a piece moving from the right (and thus moving leftward) and 左 for a piece moving from the left (rightward). For silvers, golds, and promoted pieces with gold-like movements (成銀, 成桂, 成香, と), if there is ambiguity and the pieces are side-by-side, then a piece moving straight forward is indicated by 直.

Ambiguity resolution
☖ pieces in hand: –

9	8	7	6	5	4	3	2	1
									1
			金	金					2
									3
									4
									5
			銀		銀				6
									7
									8
									9

☗ pieces in hand: –
start position
Ambiguity resolution: 右
☖ pieces in hand: –

9	8	7	6	5	4	3	2	1
									1
			金	金					2
									3
									4
									5
			銀						6
				銀					7
									8
									9

☗ pieces in hand: –
５七銀右
Ambiguity resolution: 左
☖ pieces in hand: –

9	8	7	6	5	4	3	2	1
				金					1
				金					2
									3
									4
									5
					銀				6
				銀					7
									8
									9

☗ pieces in hand: –
５七銀左 5一金左
Ambiguity resolution: 直
☖ pieces in hand: –

9	8	7	6	5	4	3	2	1
				金					1
			金						2
									3
									4
									5
			銀		銀				6
									7
									8
									9

☗ pieces in hand: –
5一金直

This positional information is relative to each player's directions. Thus, △５二金右 (literally: "white 5-2 gold right") refers to the gold general on the right from White's perspective (which would be on the left from Black's perspective).

Player's perspective
☖ pieces in hand: –

9	8	7	6	5	4	3	2	1
			金		金				1
									2
									3
									4
									5
									6
									7
									8
			金		金				9

☗ pieces in hand: –
start position
Player's perspective
☖ pieces in hand: –

9	8	7	6	5	4	3	2	1
					金				1
				金					2
									3
									4
									5
									6
									7
				金					8
			金						9

☗ pieces in hand: –
☗５八右 ☖５二右

If there are three or more identical pieces, it is possible that an origin indicator (左 or 右) followed by a movement indicator (上 or 引) will be needed.

Ambiguity resolution
☖ pieces in hand: –

9	8	7	6	5	4	3	2	1
									1
									2
									3
									4
									5
			銀		銀				6
									7
			銀		銀				8
									9

☗ pieces in hand: –
start position
Ambiguity resolution: 左引
☖ pieces in hand: –

9	8	7	6	5	4	3	2	1
									1
									2
									3
									4
									5
					銀				6
				銀					7
			銀		銀				8
									9

☗ pieces in hand: –
５七銀左引
Ambiguity resolution: 左上
☖ pieces in hand: –

9	8	7	6	5	4	3	2	1
									1
									2
									3
									4
									5
			銀		銀				6
				銀					7
					銀				8
									9

☗ pieces in hand: –
５七銀左上
Ambiguity resolution: 右上
☖ pieces in hand: –

9	8	7	6	5	4	3	2	1
									1
									2
									3
									4
									5
			銀		銀				6
				銀					7
			銀						8
									9

☗ pieces in hand: –
５七銀右上

Additionally, the 直 indicator tends to always be used for vertical movement even when simply using 右 ("right") and 左 ("left") would suffice. Relatedly, 直 is not recommended to be used for dragons and horses.

直
☖ pieces in hand: –

9	8	7	6	5	4	3	2	1
									1
									2
									3
			龍	龍					4
									5
									6
			銀	銀					7
									8
									9

☗ pieces in hand: –
start position
直
☖ pieces in hand: –

9	8	7	6	5	4	3	2	1
									1
									2
				龍					3
				龍					4
									5
				銀					6
				銀					7
									8
									9

☗ pieces in hand: –
５六銀左 ５三龍左
直
☖ pieces in hand: –

9	8	7	6	5	4	3	2	1
									1
									2
				龍					3
			龍						4
									5
				銀					6
			銀						7
									8
									9

☗ pieces in hand: –
５六銀直 ５三龍右

===== Promotion =====
A piece that promotes is indicated with 成 (naru) following the piece's character, such as ７三桂成 (N-73+). If a piece does not promote, this is indicated with 不成 (narazu) following the piece's character, such as ７三桂不成 (N-73=).

There is an alternate symbol for non-promotion: 生 is sometimes used instead of 不成 – for instance, ７三桂生 instead of ７三桂不成.

===== Numbering =====
Unlike western notation, numbering Japanese game records is not obligatory. Although players' moves often are not numbered, shogi moves are always counted per player's move. This is commonly seen in checkmate problems where a 3-move (３手) checkmate problem would mean a move sequence of black-white-black. This is unlike western chess which counts each pair of moves as one move. (In western notation for shogi, the move numbering tends to follow western chess notation conventions.)

===== Game end =====
Shogi games are officially over when a player formally resigns. The resignation is notated as 投了 tōryō. Other possible endings include rare 千日手 draw by repetition, 反則手 illegal move, and the very rare 持将棋 draw by impasse.

===== Other conventions =====
Unlike western notation, a capture of a piece is never explicitly notated in the Japanese system since the capture can be understood in the context of the game. However, when 同 is used, it always implies a capture. So, in this sense 同 is a notated capture. But, other captures of pieces that do not have the same coordinates as the preceding move are simply not indicated in the notation system.

===== Shorthand =====
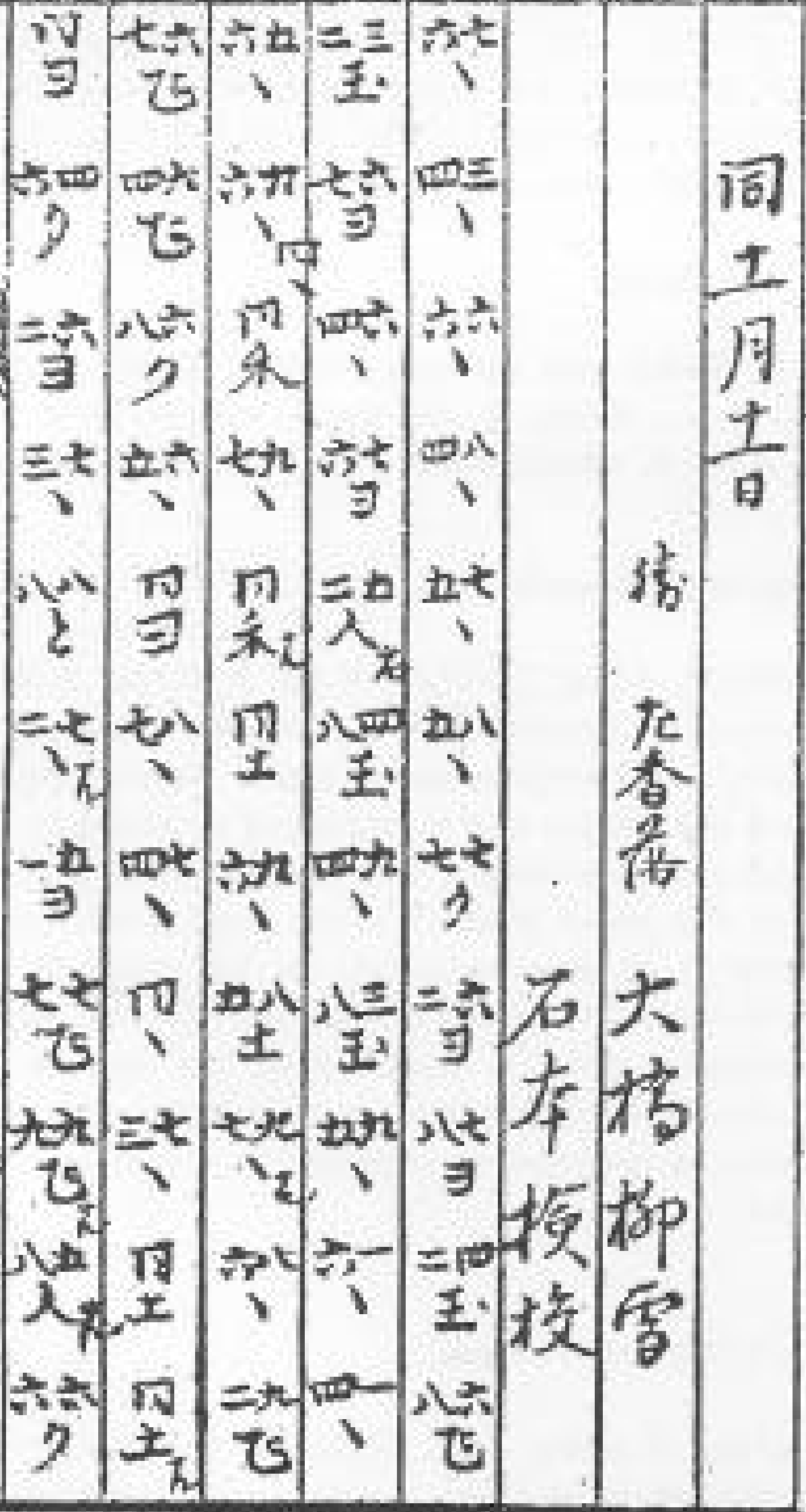
A game record from an 1839 Right Lance handicap game between Kenko Ishimoto (石本検校) who is Black (shitate) and Ryusetsu Ohashi (大橋柳雪) who is White. The game record uses shorthand notation. For example, the first move indicated is 七六丶 with the numerals read from right-to-left. This would be written in the standard notation as ７六歩. However, typically, White is notated as the top player these days, so this would be notated more typically as △３四歩 with the western equivalent as 1. ...P-34.

In addition to the usual kanji symbols, there are also shorthand versions of piece symbols that can be written very quickly. For several of the symbols, there is variation in what shorthand symbol is used – the ones listed here may not be exhaustive of all the alternatives used in Japan.

Regular symbol	Shorthand
歩	丶, フ, ゝ, ・
と	と
香	禾, キ, ↑
桂	土
銀	ヨ
金	人
角	ク
馬	マ, ウ
飛	ヒ, 乙
龍	立, リ
玉	王, 玉, ○
成	ナ
不成	フナ, 不ナ
同	－, 𠔼, ド

==== Iroha notation ====
A notation used in older times was the iroha notation. It used the syllables of the Japanese poem Iroha (いろは歌) (as well as other Japanese characters) to label each square on the shogi board.

Iroha coordinate labels
9	8	7	6	5	4	3	2	1	
谷	柳	万	一	ゆ	ま	つ	ぬ	い	a
川	桜	花	三	め	け	ね	る	ろ	b
海	松	鳥	五	み	ふ	な	を	は	c
里	楓	風	六	し	こ	ら	わ	に	d
村	雨	月	七	ひ	え	む	か	ほ	e
森	露	春	八	も	て	う	よ	へ	f
竹	霜	夏	十	せ	あ	の	た	と	g
草	雪	秋	百	す	さ	く	れ	ち	h
石	山	冬	千	京	き	や	そ	り	i

For example, the 23 square was indicated by the symbol を. Tokugawa Ieharu (the tenth shōgun 1760–1786) favored this notational system. Therefore, it was used for all castle game records during his reign.

=== Kitao–Kawasaki notation ===
The Kitao–Kawasaki notation is a hybrid notation introduced by the Nekomado publishing company in English translations of shogi books by Madoka Kitao and Takashi Kaneko. The system incorporates elements of both the western and the Japanese notation systems.

The order of elements is the same as the western system except that a player's side argument is added.

1	2	3	4	5	6
player's side	piece	(origin)	movement	(destination)	(promotion)

A typical move is indicated like ☗歩-86 (western equivalent: P-86). An example that uses all 6 parts is ☗銀(72)x83+ (S72x83+ in western notation).

1. Player's side. Like the Japanese system, the black and white shogi pieces ☗ and ☖ are used.
2. Piece. Like the Japanese system, the characters for the shogi pieces are used. For promoted pieces, pieces that are notated with 成 in Japanese notation are notated with the western symbol + instead. However, unlike the western system, this convention is not used for the pawn, bishop, or rook. The convention of using kanji overlooks the issue of non-Japanese handwritten records.

Kitao–Kawasaki	English Term	Western	Japanese
と	promoted pawn	+P	と
+香	promoted lance	+L	成香
+桂	promoted knight	+N	成桂
+銀	promoted silver	+S	成銀
馬	promoted bishop	+B	馬
龍	promoted rook	+R	龍

3. Ambiguity resolution: origin coordinates. In cases where the moving piece is ambiguous, the starting square coordinates enclosed in parentheses are added to the string. This is only indicated when needed to resolve ambiguity. Thus, following the example used above, 金(77)-78 is equivalent to western G77-78 and Japanese 7八金引, 金(68)-78 equivalent to G68-78 and 7八金寄, and 金(79)-78 equivalent to G79-78 and 7八金上.
4. Movement type. The three movement types (-, x, *) are the same as in the western system. Thus: 歩-24, 歩x, 歩*24. Like the western system (but unlike the Japanese system), this movement indication is obligatory in all contexts.
5. Destination coordinates. Indicates which square a piece is moved to. Like the Japanese system, rank (row) coordinates are indicated with a numeral (and not a letter). However, Arabic numerals are used instead of Japanese numerals. For example, 76 is equivalent to Japanese 7六. When a piece is moved to the same location as the preceding piece (in a capture), the designation coordinates are omitted. This is similar to the use of 同 in the Japanese system. For example, the sequence ☗歩-24 ☖歩x ☗角x ☖角x ☗飛x would be equivalent to western 1. P-24 Px24, 2. Bx24 Bx24, 3. Rx24 and Japanese ☗2四歩☖同歩☗同角☖同角☗同飛.
6. Other conventions. Like the Japanese system, the numbering of moves is not obligatory. The ellipsis (...) notation for White's moves in the western system is not needed (as ☖ is used instead).

=== Comparison examples ===
Notation Example 1
Board after 44 moves

Gote/White
Pieces-in-hand: 銀歩歩歩歩

	9	8	7	6	5	4	3	2	1
一	91	81	71	61	51	41	31	21	11	a
二	92	82	72	62	52	42	32	22	12	b
三	93	83	73	63	53	43	33	23	13	c
四	94	84	74	64	54	44	34	24	14	d
五	95	85	75	65	55	45	35	25	15	e
六	96	86	76	66	56	46	36	26	16	f
七	97	87	77	67	57	47	37	27	17	g
八	98	88	78	68	58	48	38	28	18	h
九	99	89	79	69	59	49	39	29	19	i

Sente/Black
Pieces-in-hand: 銀歩歩

As an example, a Tempo Loss Bishop Exchange game might proceed and be notated like this: (Note: These are the first 44 moves of an Asahi Trophy Open game by Akira Inaba and Mamoru Hatakeyama on 2008 November 13.)

Notation Example 1
Western-style Notation

1. P-76	P-34
2. P-26	G-32
3. G-78	P-84
4. P-25	Bx88+
5. Sx88	S-22
6. S-38	S-33
7. P-36	S-72
8. K-68	P-64
9. S-37	P-85
10. S-46	P-86
11. Px86	Rx86
12. P-24	Px24
13. N-77	R-82
14. P-35	Px35
15. Sx35	P-74
16. Sx24	Sx24
17. Rx24	P*23
18. R-26	P-75
19. P*83	Sx83
20. B*63	B*74
21. B-18+	Bx47+
22. G-58	+B-14

Japanese-style Notation

1. ７六歩	(7-6 P)	2. ３四歩	(3-4 P)
3. ２六歩	(2-6 P)	4. ３二金	(3-2 G)
5. ７八金	(7-8 G)	6. ８四歩	(8-4 P)
7. ２五歩	(2-5 P)	8. ８八角成	(8-8 B promote)
9. 同 銀	(same S)	10. ２二銀	(2-2 S)
11. ３八銀	(3-8 S)	12. ３三銀	(3-3 S)
13. ３六歩	(3-6 P)	14. ７二銀	(7-2 S)
15. ６八玉	(6-8 K)	16. ６四歩	(6-4 P)
17. ３七銀	(3-7 S)	18. ８五歩	(8-5 P)
19. ４六銀	(4-6 S)	20. ８六歩	(8-6 P)
21. 同歩	(same P)	22. 同飛	(same R)
23. ２四歩	(2-4 P)	24. 同歩	(same P)
25. ７七桂	(7-7 N)	26. ８二飛	(8-2 R)
27. ３五歩	(3-5 P)	28. 同歩	(same P)
29. 同 銀	(same S)	30. ７四歩	(7-4 P)
31. ２四銀	(2-4 S)	32. 同銀	(same S)
33. 同飛	(same R)	34. ２三歩打	(2-3 P drop)
35. ２六飛	(2-6 R)	36. ７五歩	(7-5 P)
37. ８三歩打	(8-3 P drop)	38. 同銀	(same S)
39. ６三角打	(6-3 B drop)	40. ７四角打	(7-4 B drop)
41. １八角成	(1-8 B promote)	42. ４七角成	(4-7 B promote)
43. ５八金	(5-8 G)	44. １四馬	(1-4 +B)

Notation Example 2
Board after 37 moves

Gote/White
Pieces-in-hand: 銀歩

	9	8	7	6	5	4	3	2	1
一	91	81	71	61	51	41	31	21	11	a
二	92	82	72	62	52	42	32	22	12	b
三	93	83	73	63	53	43	33	23	13	c
四	94	84	74	64	54	44	34	24	14	d
五	95	85	75	65	55	45	35	25	15	e
六	96	86	76	66	56	46	36	26	16	f
七	97	87	77	67	57	47	37	27	17	g
八	98	88	78	68	58	48	38	28	18	h
九	99	89	79	69	59	49	39	29	19	i

Sente/Black
Pieces-in-hand: 歩歩

Below is another notated game (Ishida opening) showing the more typical Japanese notation where moves are not numbered, dropped pieces are not indicated, and white/black turns are marked. (Note: These are the first 37 moves of an Mynavi Women's Open by Saori Shimai and Haruko Saida on 2009 October 21.) It also shows an example of ambiguity resolution (G69-58/５八金左) and a piece entering a promotion zone that remains unpromoted (Sx23=/２三銀不成).

Notation Example 2
Western (Hosking)

1. P76	P34
2. P75	P35
3. R78	R32
4. G69-58	G41-52
5. K48	P14
6. P16	K62
7. P46	P64
8. G47	S72
9. S38	K71
10. K39	S42
11. P96	P44
12. S68	S43
13. P66	S54
14. S67	R42
15. S56	P45
16. Px45	Sx45
17. Sx45	Rx45
18. S’34	R41
19. Sx23=

Western (Hodges)

1. P-7f	P-3d
2. P-7e	P-3e
3. R-7h	R-3b
4. G6i-5h	G4a-5b
5. K-4h	P-1d
6. P-1f	K-6b
7. P-4f	P-6d
8. G-4g	S-7b
9. S-3h	K-7a
10. K-3i	S-4b
11. P-9f	P-4d
12. S-6h	S-4c
13. P-6f	S-5d
14. S-6g	R-4b
15. S-5f	P-4e
16. Px4e	Sx4e
17. Sx4e	Rx4e
18. S*3d	R-4a
19. Sx2c=

Japanese

☗７六歩	☖３四歩
☗７五歩	☖３五歩
☗７八飛	☖３二飛
☗５八金左	☖５二金左
☗４八玉	☖１四歩
☗１六歩	☖６二王
☗４六歩	☖６四歩
☗４七金	☖７二銀
☗３八銀	☖７一王
☗３九玉	☖４二銀
☗９六歩	☖４四歩
☗６八銀	☖４三銀
☗６六歩	☖５四銀
☗６七銀	☖４二飛
☗５六銀	☖４五歩
☗同歩	☖同銀
☗同銀	☖同飛
☗３四銀	☖４一飛
☗２三銀不成

Kitao–Kawasaki

☗歩-76	☖歩-34
☗歩-75	☖歩-35
☗飛-78	☖飛-32
☗金(69)-58	☖金(41)-52
☗玉-48	☖歩-14
☗歩-16	☖王-62
☗歩-46	☖歩-64
☗金-47	☖銀-72
☗銀-38	☖玉-71
☗玉-39	☖銀-42
☗歩-96	☖歩-44
☗銀-68	☖銀-43
☗歩-66	☖銀-54
☗銀-67	☖飛-42
☗銀-58	☖歩-45
☗歩x	☖銀x
☗銀x	☖飛x
☗銀*34	☖飛-41
☗銀x23=

== Recording games and positions ==
=== SFEN ===
SFEN is an extension of Forsyth–Edwards Notation (FEN) used for describing board positions of shogi games.

Formally, an SFEN is a text string of ASCII characters. It has four fields that are separated by a space. The fields:

1. Piece placement on the board from Black's perspective
2. Who has the next move
3. Pieces in hand
4. Move count (optional)
Corresponding board
☖ pieces in hand: 角

9	8	7	6	5	4	3	2	1
香	桂	銀	金	王			桂	香	1
	飛					金	銀		2
歩		歩	歩	歩	歩		歩	歩	3
	歩					歩			4
							歩		5
		歩							6
歩	歩		歩	歩	歩	歩		歩	7
	銀	金					飛		8
香	桂			玉	金	銀	桂	香	9

☗ pieces in hand: 角

The following is an example (from a Tempo Loss Bishop Exchange opening)

lnsgk2nl/1r4gs1/p1pppp1pp/1p4p2/7P1/2P6/PP1PPPP1P/1SG4R1/LN2KGSNL b Bb

In this example, the first field is lnsgk2nl/1r4gs1/p1pppp1pp/1p4p2/7P1/2P6/PP1PPPP1P/1SG4R1/LN2KGSNL, the second is b, and the third is Bb. The fourth field is omitted, which is allowed.

For the first field, each piece is represented with a single letter. Gote's pieces are lowercase letters while Sente's pieces are uppercase letters. The set of letters used are the same as the ones used in western notation (p, +p, l, +l, n, +n, s, +s, g, b, +b, r, +r, k). Each rank is separated by a forward slash (/). The listing of ranks is from top (rank 1) to bottom (rank 9), and the order to pieces is from file 9 to file 1 (in other words, from left to right as viewed on typical shogi diagram with gote as the top player and sente as the bottom player). Empty squares are indicated with numeral corresponding to the number of adjacent empty squares on the same rank. In the example, rank 1 is lnsgk2nl which indicates sequence of lance, knight, silver, gold, king followed by two empty squares to the right of the king and a sequence of knight and lance.

The second field can be either b for Black's turn to play or w for White's turn to play. In the example, b indicates that Black has the next move.

The third field contains all of the pieces in hand held by each player. Black's pieces in hand use capital letters while White's pieces in hand use lowercase. In the example, the Bb indicates that Black has one bishop in hand (B), and White also has one bishop in hand (b). In SFEN holdings, if there are more than one piece of a type in hand, it is preceded by the piece count, e.g. 3P for three pawns in hand.

The fourth field is an integer representing the current move of the game. Moves are counted under shogi convention, meaning the move count is incremented with a single player's action. This field is specified as optional, but a program may require it for reading SFENs; for that reason, most programs will include the move count field when exporting positions.

Below is another example showing the board position for Yoshiharu Habu's famous 52 silver drop in an NHK game (Bishop Exchange Climbing Silver opening) with Hifumi Katoh.

Corresponding board
☖ pieces in hand: 桂 歩

9	8	7	6	5	4	3	2	1
香	桂		金						1
	飛			銀		王			2
歩			歩	歩	歩	桂			3
		歩				歩			4
	歩								5
		歩							6
歩	歩	銀	歩	歩	歩	歩	香	歩	7
		金			玉		歩	飛	8
香	桂					金		角	9

☗ pieces in hand: 角 金 銀 香 歩

ln1g5/1r2S1k2/p2pppn2/2ps2p2/1p7/2P6/PPSPPPPLP/2G2K1pr/LN4G1b w BGSLPnp 62

=== FEEN ===
FEEN (Field Expression Encoding Notation) is a notation format designed to represent static board positions in abstract strategy games such as shogi, chess, and their variants.

A FEEN string consists of three space-separated fields: piece placement, pieces in hand, and game style/turn indicator.

Example (shogi starting position):

lnsgk^gsnl/1r5b1/ppppppppp/9/9/9/PPPPPPPPP/1B5R1/LNSGK^GSNL / S/s

The format uses letters for pieces (lowercase for gote, uppercase for sente), with ranks separated by / and consecutive empty squares represented by numbers. Pieces in hand are listed after the board position (empty at game start: /). The final field (S/s) indicates both players use shogi rules, with sente to move.

FEEN is designed to be rule-agnostic, representing board state without encoding game-specific legality rules. It supports promoted pieces using + prefix (e.g., +R for promoted rook).

=== KIF ===
The KIF file format is used for saving full games of shogi. Internally, it uses Japanese notation in the UTF-8 text encoding, and each move is disambiguated with an origin square.

=== KI2 ===
The KI2 file format is similar to the KIF format but more compact. Moves are only disambiguated with the standard Japanese relative direction kanji.

=== CSA ===
Another format for saving positions and games of shogi, which only uses ASCII internally. Mostly used in the computer shogi arena.

=== PSN ===
Portable Shogi Notation is a derivative of the Portable Game Notation used in chess, expanded to specify shogi pieces and drops. It uses the Hodges coordinate system. It has little support outside of GNU Shogi.

GNU Shogi also uses EPD instead of SFEN: the same board description, but with holdings appended in square brackets. Each held piece is listed, e.g. PPP for three pawns in hand. The following field for player to move has colors reversed from SFEN: w for sente, and b for gote.

== See also ==
- Chess notation

== Sources ==
- Fairbairn, John (1980). "Just for the record". Shogi. No. 25. p. 5.
- Fairbairn, John (1981). "Great talents mature late". Shogi. No. 30. pp. 10–13.
- Fairbairn, John (1986). Shogi for beginners (2nd ed.). Ishi Press. ISBN 978-4-8718-720-10.
- Hodges, George F (1976a). "Notation". Shogi. No. 1. p. 4.
- Hodges, George F (1976b). "Editorial". Shogi. No. 2. p. 3.
- Hodges, George F (1978a). "How to read Japanese scores". Shogi. No. 14. p. 2.
- Hodges, George F (1978b). "How to read Japanese scores no. 2". Shogi. No. 16. p. 2.
- Hodges, George F (1979a). "How to read Japanese scores no. 3". Shogi. No. 17. p. 2.
- Hodges, George F (1979b). "How to read Japanese scores no. 4". Shogi. No. 19. p. 2.
- Hodges, George F (1985a). "Read Japanese scores". Shogi. No. 57. p. 9.
- Hodges, George F (1985b). "Notes on the 行 character from Japanese scores page 9". Shogi. No. 57. p. 17.
- Hosking, Tony (1996). The art of shogi. The Shogi Foundation. ISBN 978-0-95310-890-9.
