= Kimura joseki =

Kimura joseki
☖ pieces in hand: 角

9	8	7	6	5	4	3	2	1
香							桂	香	1
	飛			金		金	王		2
		桂		歩		銀	歩		3
歩		歩	歩	銀	歩	歩		歩	4
	歩						歩		5
歩		歩	歩	銀	歩	歩		歩	6
	歩	銀		歩		桂			7
	玉	金		金			飛		8
香	桂							香	9

☗ pieces in hand: 角

In shogi, the Kimura joseki (木村定跡) is a joseki for a Bishop Exchange Reclining Silver (Double Static Rook) opening. It was developed by lifetime Meijin Yoshio Kimura.

== Development ==
=== Basic Diagram ===
Diagram 2. Kimura joseki basic diagram
☖ pieces in hand: 角

9	8	7	6	5	4	3	2	1
香						王	桂	香	1
	飛			金		金			2
		桂		歩		銀	歩		3
歩		歩	歩	銀	歩	歩		歩	4
	歩						歩		5
歩		歩	歩	銀	歩	歩		歩	6
	歩	銀		歩		桂			7
		金		金			飛		8
香	桂	玉						香	9

☗ pieces in hand: 角

From the first move:

1. P-76, P-84; 2. P-26, G-32; 3. G-78, P-85; 4. B-77, P-34;

5. S-88, Bx77+; 6. Sx77, S-42; 7. S-38, S-72; 8. P-46, P-64;

9. S-47, S-63; 10. P-66, G-52; 11. G-58, K-41; 12. K-68, S-54;

13. S-56, K-31; 14. K-79, P-14; 15. P-16, P-94; 16. P-96, P-74;

17. P-36, P-44; 18. N-37, N-73; 19. P-25, S-33 (Diagram 2).

From here, it'll go later with K-88, K-22 (Diagram 1), and hostilities will start with Black's pushing and sacrificing the pawn at the 4th file with P-45.

=== Intermediate Diagram ===
Diagram 3. Kimura joseki intermediate diagram
☖ pieces in hand: 歩 (4)

9	8	7	6	5	4	3	2	1
香							桂		1
	飛			金		金	王		2
		桂	角	歩			歩	香	3
歩			歩	銀	銀	歩			4
	歩	歩			歩	歩	桂	歩	5
歩			歩	銀					6
	歩	銀		歩					7
	玉	金		金			飛		8
香	桂							香	9

☗ pieces in hand: 角

From Diagram 1, following 20. P-45, Px45, the odds fall on Black with the push of the pawn 21. P-35. From there

21... S-44; 22. P-75, Px75; 23. P-15, Px15; P-24, Px24; 24. Rx24, P*23;

25. R-28, B*63; 26. P*13, Lx13; 27. N-25 (Diagram 3), L-14; 28. Px34, P-24;

29. Nx33+, Nx33; 30. Rx24, G-23; 31. B*11, K-32; 32. Px33+, Sx33;

33. N*44, Sx44; 34. Rx23+, Kx23; 35. Bx44+ (Diagram 4)

=== Resign Diagram ===
Diagram 4. Kimura joseki resign diagram
☖ pieces in hand: 飛 桂(2) 歩(5)

9	8	7	6	5	4	3	2	1
香									1
	飛			金					2
		桂	角	歩			王		3
歩			歩	銀	馬			香	4
	歩	歩			歩			歩	5
歩			歩	銀					6
	歩	銀		歩					7
	玉	金		金					8
香	桂							香	9

☗ pieces in hand: 金 銀 歩(5)

== See also ==
- Bishop Exchange
- Bishop Exchange Reclining Silver
- Reclining Silver
- Static Rook

== Bibliography ==
- 『新版 角換わり腰掛け銀研究』 ISBN 4839900663
- Hosking, Tony (1996). The art of shogi. The Shogi Foundation. ISBN 978-0-95310-890-9.
