= Bishop Exchange, Rushing Silver =

Bishop Exchange
Rushing Silver
☖ pieces in hand: 角

9	8	7	6	5	4	3	2	1
香	桂						桂	香	1
	飛		銀	金	王	金			2
歩		桂		歩	歩	銀	歩	歩	3
			歩			歩			4
	歩						歩		5
		歩			銀	歩			6
歩	歩	銀	歩	歩	歩			歩	7
		金					飛		8
香	桂			玉	金		桂	香	9

☗ pieces in hand: 角

In shogi, Bishop Exchange Rushing Silver (角換わり早繰り銀 kakugawari hayakurigin) is a Bishop Exchange opening that uses a Rushing Silver attacking formation with the right silver.

Rushing Silver has the silver positioned above the line of pawn on the fourth file if played by Black or the sixth file if played by White.

The name Rushing Silver was also translated as Rapid Advancing Silver by Tomohide Kawasaki (also known as Hidetchi).

== See also ==
- Bishop Exchange
- Bishop Exchange Reclining Silver
- Bishop Exchange Climbing Silver
- Tempo Loss Bishop Exchange
- Wrong Diagonal Bishop Exchange
- Static Rook

== Bibliography ==
- Hosking, Tony (1996). The art of shogi. The Shogi Foundation. ISBN 978-0-95310-890-9.
- Kitao, Madoka (2011). Joseki at a glance. Translated by Kawasaki, Tomohide. Nekomado. ISBN 978-4-9052-2501-0.
