= Bishop Exchange =

Bishop Exchange
☖ pieces in hand: 角

9	8	7	6	5	4	3	2	1
香	桂		金	王			桂	香	1
	飛	銀			銀	金			2
歩		歩	歩	歩	歩		歩	歩	3
						歩			4
	歩								5
		歩					歩		6
歩	歩	銀	歩	歩	歩	歩		歩	7
		金				銀	飛		8
香	桂			玉	金		桂	香	9

☗ pieces in hand: 角

In shogi, Bishop Exchange (Japanese: 角換わり or 角換り, romanized: kakugawari) is a Double Static Rook opening in which the players exchange their bishops relatively early so as to have bishops in hand. Throughout the game, both players have a bishop drop threat, with which they can exploit any positional weakness that their opponent inadvertently creates.

== Overview ==
Initial Configuration
☖ pieces in hand: –

9	8	7	6	5	4	3	2	1
香	桂	銀	金	王	金	銀	桂	香	1
	飛						角		2
歩		歩	歩	歩	歩	歩	歩	歩	3
									4
	歩								5
		歩					歩		6
歩	歩		歩	歩	歩	歩		歩	7
	角						飛		8
香	桂	銀	金	玉	金	銀	桂	香	9

☗ pieces in hand: –
Before the Exchange
☖ pieces in hand: –

9	8	7	6	5	4	3	2	1
香	桂	銀	金	王		銀	桂	香	1
	飛					金	角		2
歩		歩	歩	歩	歩		歩	歩	3
						歩			4
	歩								5
		歩					歩		6
歩	歩	角	歩	歩	歩	歩		歩	7
		金	銀				飛		8
香	桂			玉	金	銀	桂	香	9

☗ pieces in hand: –

After the Exchange
☖ pieces in hand: 角

9	8	7	6	5	4	3	2	1
香	桂	銀	金	王			桂	香	1
	飛					金	銀		2
歩		歩	歩	歩	歩		歩	歩	3
						歩			4
	歩								5
		歩					歩		6
歩	歩	銀	歩	歩	歩	歩		歩	7
		金					飛		8
香	桂			玉	金	銀	桂	香	9

☗ pieces in hand: 角

The Bishop Exchange opening is a Double Static Rook opening. Black starts with activating both their bishop (P-76) and rook (P-26) while White quickly puts pressure on Black with rook pawn pushes (...P-84, ...P-85). White's aim is to exchange their rook pawn off the board on the eighth file as soon as possible. This has a number of benefits: it gives White a pawn in hand that can be used to drop later in the game, and it frees up the rook so that it can move to any rank above Black's camp (see: Sabaki). However, in this opening, in response, Black wishes to prevent White's early rook pawn exchange by defending the 86 square with the bishop via B-77 (and, later after the bishop exchange with the left silver via S-77).

Generally speaking, there is usually this tension of whether to allow rook pawn exchanges and/or bishop exchanges in the major Double Static Rook openings. In contrast to Double Wing Attack and Side Pawn Capture openings, but like the Double Fortress opening, the Bishop Exchange opening prevents each player from trading off each other's rook pawn. Both players move their left silver to the 77 and 33 squares (Black and White, respectively) in order to accomplish this goal in both Bishop Exchange and Fortress openings. (And, Fortress contrasts with Bishop Exchange by preventing an early bishop exchange as well.)

Because the bishops are off the board, each player is restricted in their development compared to other openings since they must not allow any holes where their opponent can drop a bishop.

Certain positions of Bishop Exchange – particularly, the Reclining Silver variations with identical forms for each player – have had a tendency to be drawish in which White wishes for sennichite and Black is unwilling to break the balance of the position. The Bishop Exchange (角換わり, kakugawari) has been one of the most deeply analyzed double static rook openings in professional shogi due to the long-term strategic impact of having bishops in hand.

=== Castles ===
Helmet Fortress Castle
☖ pieces in hand: –

9	8	7	6	5	4	3	2	1
									1
									2
									3
									4
									5
歩		歩							6
	歩	銀	歩	歩					7
		金	玉	金					8
香	桂								9

☗ pieces in hand: 角
Helmet Castle With G-48
☖ pieces in hand: –

9	8	7	6	5	4	3	2	1
									1
									2
									3
									4
									5
歩		歩							6
	歩	銀	歩	歩					7
		金			金				8
香	桂	玉							9

☗ pieces in hand: 角

Bishop Exchange openings typically use a variant of the Fortress castle known as the Helmet Fortress castle (or just Helmet castle). This castle has the characteristic Fortress form with a silver on 77 and gold on 78. However, unlike the standard Fortress, the Helmet castle keeps the right gold on the 58 square and the sixth file pawn is not necessarily pushed to 66 to make way for the right gold to move to 67. One reason for this difference is that the middlegame fight often starts before this development could be finished. In some situations, when the right offensive knight has jumped to 37 square (or 73 square for White), the gold may need to move from 58 to the 67 square in order to protect the head of the knight (the 36 square) from the opponent's pawn drops.

Another difference is the position of the king initially on the 68 square. Since the bishop is off the board, the king is not restricted in rightward movement to the 69 square like the usual development in the Fortress opening. After the king moves to 68, it may be possible to move the king into the castle to the 88 square via 79. However, again, it often happens that the middlegame will start before the king can make it to 88. Because of this, the king often remains on 68 or on the intermediate 79 square. In some variations, moving to 88 is even not recommended.

The ninth file edge pawn is typically pushed (P-96/...P-14) in this castle since both bishops are in hand and could otherwise be dropped on the ninth or first files. (The standard Fortress often does not have the edge pawn pushed.) However, faster attacking strategies (Climbing Silver, Rushing Silver) may start the offense before the edge pawns are pushed.

Another variation of the castle formation is to have the right gold on the 48 square (62 square for White) where it can defend more area on the right side of the board from the opponent's bishop drop. In the case of a Right King formation in which the king moves rightward away from the Helmet castle, the gold on 48 will be closer to the king, which can rest on the 38 square. This G48/G62 is a form that Lifetime Meijin Yoshio Kimura (now deceased) had experimented with in the first half of the last century and is now experiencing a revival in popularity becoming the most common form found in current (2016–2019) professional shogi.

As for White's Hemlet development, White will often wait for Black to push their rook pawn to the 25 square before moving their castle silver to the 33 square (so that it defends the 24 square preventing a second file pawn exchange). Depending on the game, this may occur fairly late in the opening. Before Black's pawn push, White's silver will usually remain on the 42 square until that time.

Gold Fortress Castle
☖ pieces in hand: –

9	8	7	6	5	4	3	2	1
									1
									2
									3
									4
									5
歩		歩	歩						6
	歩	銀	金	歩					7
	玉	金							8
香	桂								9

☗ pieces in hand: 角
White's Dented Fortress
☖ pieces in hand: –

9	8	7	6	5	4	3	2	1
						王	桂	香	1
					金	金			2
				歩		銀	歩		3
					歩	歩		歩	4
									5
									6
									7
									8
									9

☗ pieces in hand: –

Of course, this Helmet castle may be developed into a regular (Gold) Fortress castle if the opponent aims for an attack on the sixth file (or fourth file for White). White may often choose this castle development if they are playing defensively.

In Double Reclining Silver games, White's castle has often been a variant of the Dented Fortress castle (へこみ矢倉 hekomi yagura) with the king directly under the left gold (on 31) and the right gold adjacent to the left gold (on 42) with the pawn above it pushed to allow for development into a Gold Fortress.

Sōta Fujii vs Masayuki Toyoshima 2019
☖ pieces in hand: 角

9	8	7	6	5	4	3	2	1
香	飛						桂	香	1
			金	玉		金			2
		桂		歩		銀	歩		3
歩		歩	歩	銀	歩	歩		歩	4
	歩						歩		5
歩		歩	歩	銀	歩	歩		歩	6
	歩	銀		歩		桂			7
		金			金				8
香	桂	玉					飛	香	9

☗ pieces in hand: 角
White's king on 52.
After 39 moves.

More recently in 2018, the emphasis on White's king safety has been relaxed, and the king is placed the 52 square or the 42 square instead of moving to 31 or 22. (Note that if the king is on 42, then this implies that White will position their silver on 22 if Black has not already pushed their rook pawn to 25, which differs from the book lines that use the silver on 42.) The adjacent diagram shows an example of such a position from 2019 – a Double Reclining Silver, P25 R29 G48 Identical Formation variation. At the time of this example, there were over 40 games with this same position in the Japan Shogi Association game record database. White (Toyoshima) moved their king from 42 to 52 opting for losing tempo (since he could have played K-52 from the start position) and waiting for a counterattack over deviating from his ideal configuration, in which White is broadly defending against bishop drops.

=== Attacking formations ===
Reclining Silver
☖ pieces in hand:

9	8	7	6	5	4	3	2	1
									1
									2
									3
									4
									5
歩		歩	歩	銀	歩	歩	歩	歩	6
	歩	銀		歩		桂			7
		金		金			飛		8
香	桂	玉						香	9

☗ pieces in hand: 角
Reclining Silver
P-25 · G-48 · R-29 variation
☖ pieces in hand:

9	8	7	6	5	4	3	2	1
									1
									2
									3
									4
							歩		5
歩		歩		銀	歩	歩		歩	6
	歩	銀	歩	歩		桂			7
		金	玉		金				8
香	桂						飛	香	9

☗ pieces in hand: 角

There are a number of attacking strategies used with Bishop Exchange. The three main strategies are classified by the configuration of the right offensive silver: Reclining Silver, Climbing Silver, Rushing Silver.

The most popular strategy among professional players is the Reclining Silver variation where the right silver is advanced to the 56 square (54 square for White) via 47. Typically, the right knight is also advanced to the 37 square for the attack. The rook pawn may be advanced to the 25 square although it is also possible that it is left on the 26 square so that the knight can jump to 25. In some cases, moving the silver to 56 very early can be problematic.

The traditional form of Reclining Silver uses a Helmet castle with the right gold on the 58 square. This position allows a possible attack on the fourth file by having the rook shift to the 48 square. A more recent Reclining Silver position is the P-25 · G-48 · R-29 variation. This positions the right gold on 48 instead of 58 and the rook moves down to the 29 square (if left on 28 then the gold and rook are susceptible to an opponent's fork by dropping their bishop to the 39 square).

Due to its involvement of several pieces, Reclining Silver is the most deliberate out of the three silver strategies and it is balanced with both offensive and defensive characteristics. In comparison, the other two silver strategies have a stronger attacking character. Several entire books have been written on solely Reclining Silver Bishop Exchange variations.

Climbing Silver
☖ pieces in hand:

9	8	7	6	5	4	3	2	1
									1
									2
									3
									4
							歩		5
		歩					銀		6
歩	歩	銀	歩	歩	歩	歩		歩	7
		金					飛		8
香	桂			玉	金		桂	香	9

☗ pieces in hand: 角
Rushing Silver
☖ pieces in hand:

9	8	7	6	5	4	3	2	1
									1
									2
									3
									4
							歩		5
		歩			銀	歩			6
歩	歩	銀	歩	歩	歩			歩	7
		金	玉				飛		8
香	桂				金		桂	香	9

☗ pieces in hand: 角

The Climbing Silver variation places the silver on the second file on 26 (or 84 for White) usually aiming for an attack on the first file followed by the second file but also sometimes aiming for an attack on the third file instead. Castle development in this strategy can often be very minimal even with leaving the king in its start position before attacking. This the quickest attack out of the three silver strategies. The player may also start their attack before pushing edge pawns.

The Rushing Silver variation places the silver on the 46 square (or White's 64 square) after moving through the 37 square, which has been cleared with a P-36 pawn push. The aim is to attack starting on the third file moving diagonally to the second file. An issue with the P-36 configuration is that once the offensive silver has moved for its attack, the rook on 28 becomes susceptible to the opponent's bishop attacks through the 37 square.

Right King
☖ pieces in hand:

9	8	7	6	5	4	3	2	1
									1
									2
									3
									4
							歩		5
		歩			歩	歩		歩	6
歩	歩	銀	歩	歩	銀	桂			7
		金		金		玉			8
香	桂						飛	香	9

☗ pieces in hand: 角
Right King G48 variant
☖ pieces in hand:

9	8	7	6	5	4	3	2	1
									1
									2
									3
									4
							歩		5
		歩			歩	歩		歩	6
歩	歩	銀	歩	歩	銀	桂			7
		金			金	玉			8
香	桂						飛	香	9

☗ pieces in hand: 角

A fourth and less common strategy is the defensive Right King. This strategy flouts the general shogi maxim that the king and rook should be far apart by having the king next to the rook. Here, the rook is used as a defense piece protecting the bottom rank. The left silver may be used for offense. Right King is more commonly played by White but uncommon for Black in the regular Bishop Exchange opening. However, in the Tempo Loss Bishop Exchange opening, it is more frequently played by Black than in regular Bishop Exchange and thought to be effective there.

Either player may choose any combination of these strategies. However, there are recommended strategies for each player in some positions.

=== Admonishment against fifth file pawn pushes ===
In the shogi of the early part of the twentieth century, fifth file pawn pushes – P-56 and ...P-54 – were very common. They were found in Fortress openings as well as many Double Wing Attack (see: §Old Double Wing) and Snowroof games. However, eventually, shogi theory found them problematic in Bishop Exchange openings due to the forking capabilities of the bishops in hand. (They also dropped out of favor in Double Wing Attack openings as well.)

== History ==
The Bishop Exchange, Reclining Silver variation was a popular opening up until the 1950s. However, it became prone to draws due sennichite and lost its popularity. After this, Climbing Silver and Rushing Silver variations became popular in the 1960s and 1970s.

== Main book line: White's bishop trade with ☖...P-85 ==
Bishop Exchange
up to move 2
☖ pieces in hand: –

9	8	7	6	5	4	3	2	1
香	桂	銀	金	王	金	銀	桂	香	1
	飛						角		2
歩		歩	歩	歩	歩	歩	歩	歩	3
	歩								4
									5
		歩							6
歩	歩		歩	歩	歩	歩	歩	歩	7
	角						飛		8
香	桂	銀	金	玉	金	銀	桂	香	9

☗ pieces in hand: –
1.P-76 P-84

The main book line for Bishop Exchange starts with 1.P-76 P-84 2.P-26 P-85 3.B-77 P-34 4.S-88 G-32 5.G-78 Bx77+ 6.Sx77 S-42 7.S-38.

1.P-76. Black chooses the flexible option of activating their bishop. However, Black can start with 1.P-26 as well.

1...P-84. White pushes their rook pawn showing their intent to play Static Rook and gives both players the possibility of a Bishop Exchange opening.

Moreover, 1...P-84 is required for a Bishop Exchange opening. Note that if White had opened their bishop diagonal (1...P-34) instead of 1...P-84, then a regular Bishop Exchange opening would no longer be possible. The Bishop Exchange opening has Black's bishop positioned on 77 which is subsequently replaced by their left silver on the same 77 square after the bishops are exchanged. If White's bishop diagonal is open (via 1...P-34) before the Black's bishop has moved to 77, then Black will not be able to position their silver on 77 in recapturing White's bishop for the following reasons. Firstly, moving the bishop to 77 first before the moving the silver (that is, 1.P-76 P-34 2.B-77) will most likely result in White immediately capturing the bishop with 2...Bx77+ forcing Black to recapture with 3.Nx77 which will eliminate Bishop Exchange as a possible opening and lead to completely different set of lines (namely, Black's variation of the Bishop-33 opening). Alternately, if Black attempts to use the left gold to defend the bishop with 1.P-76 P-34 2.P-26 P-84 3.G-78 in hopes of positioning the silver on 68 and the bishop on 77 later, White can simply push their rook pawn with 3...P-85 and if Black plays 4.B-77 (to defend the 86 square) White can thereafter capture with bishop with 4...Bx77+ again leading to Black to recapture with 5.Gx77 (or 5.Nx77) instead of the required silver recapture, which also disallows a Bishop Exchange opening. Finally, moving their silver to 78 or 68 (that is, 1.P-76 P-34 2.S-68??) is clearly a blunder as this will leave Black's bishop undefended to be captured for free with 2...Bx88+. The only way a Bishop Exchange opening can occur is for Black to delay pushing their rook pawn and instead prioritize developing their left gold and silver with this sequence: 1.P-76 P-34 2.G-78 P-84 3.S-68 after which a bishop exchange with 3...Bx88+ 4.Gx88. However, this sequence is very rare among professional players since it requires Black to lose tempo when moving the gold on 88 back to 78 effectively reversing Black to now play as White, which is undesirable given the slight statistical winning advantage for Black. (Note: To be clear, this sequence requires 5 tempos for Black (S-68, S-77, G-78, Gx88, G-78) compared with 4 tempos for Black (B-77, S-88, Sx77, G-78) in the standard Bishop Exchange line.) Thus, White's 1...P-34 after Black's 1.P-76 essentially rejects a Bishop Exchange possibility and will lead to other Double Static Rook, Static Rook vs Ranging Rook, or Double Ranging Rook games. For instance, 1...P-34 2.P-26 P-84 3.P-25 P-85 can lead to Side Pawn Capture.

Note that this comment about a Bishop Exchange opening being prevented by having both players' bishop diagonals open is true for the regular Bishop Exchange opening discussed here, which requires White's bishop diagonal to remain closed initially. The Japanese term 角換わり kakugawari without modification refers to this class of openings. However, the 1.P-76 P-34 sequence still allows for a possibility of a Tempo Loss Bishop Exchange opening, in which White exchanges bishops with ...Bx88+ before Black moves the bishop to the 77 square. But, this formally distinct opening is not referred to simply with 角換わり kakugawari but rather 一手損角換わり ittezon kakugawari. Although there are similarities between Bishop Exchange openings and Tempo Loss Bishop Exchange openings, the Tempo Loss Bishop Exchange is treated separately in its respective article.

Bishop Exchange
up to move 3
☖ pieces in hand: –

9	8	7	6	5	4	3	2	1
香	桂	銀	金	王	金	銀	桂	香	1
	飛						角		2
歩		歩	歩	歩	歩	歩	歩	歩	3
	歩								4
									5
		歩					歩		6
歩	歩		歩	歩	歩	歩		歩	7
	角						飛		8
香	桂	銀	金	玉	金	銀	桂	香	9

☗ pieces in hand: –
2.P-26

2.P-26. Black mirrors White in activating their rook with a pawn push. The game can now be seen as a Double Static Rook game and is strongly indicative that a Bishop Exchange opening will occur (to the point that some explanations merely say that this will lead Bishop Exchange without mentioning transpositions).

Note that 1.P-76 P-84 2.P-26 freely transposes to 1.P-26 P-84 2.P-76.

Although 2.P-26 is most typical for Bishop Exchange, other moves are possible. For instance, 2.G-78 can develop into Bishop Exchange via 2.G-78 G-32 3.P-26 P-85 4.B-77 P-34 5.S-88 or 2.G-78 P-85 3.B-77 P-34 4.S-88. (Note: 2.G-78 became one of the major second moves in Bishop Exchange by Black when Teruichi Aono played it in his first title match (Ōza) against Makoto Nakahara in 1989.) One reason for playing 2.G-78 first is that it is a measure to discourage White's Climbing Silver. If Black plays the more common 2.P-26, then White can aim to skip playing a future ...G-32 in order to speed up their Climbing Silver development and without Black's G-78 White's attack will be more threatening. However, playing 2.G-78 so early also gives White a possible Feint Ranging Rook option if White wants to try to take advantage of the gold on 78 preventing Black's usual Boat castle development against Ranging Rook strategies.

Yet another possible second move for Black is 2.S-68 (or 2.S-78). While more typical of a Fortress opening, this is also compatible with Bishop Exchange since 2...P-34 can be followed by 3.B-77 so that the silver on 68 can still recapture an exchanged bishop on 77. Nonetheless, this 1.P-76 P-84 2.S-68 P-34 3.B-77 sequence is quite uncommon since Black usually moves their bishop to 77 this early only when White plays the forcing ...P-85 rook pawn push. Moreover, if Black plays 2.S-68 and still wants to play Bishop Exchange, in this situation White is now free to delay the rook pawn push which allows for the possibility of White's ...N-85 knight jump later in the game, which is not possible in a usual Bishop Exchange opening with White's ...P-85 (and, consequently, this knight jump option gives White some formal similarities with the Tempo Loss Bishop Exchange opening). Thus, in order to prevent these other complications, the Bishop Exchange book line for Black is 2.P-26 while 2.S-68 is the book line leading to Fortress.

Additionally, Black is not required to play Bishop Exchange at this point since there are many other possibilities such as playing the aforementioned 2.S-68 for a Fortress opening or 2.P-56 for a Central Rook opening, among others.

Bishop Exchange
up to move 4
☖ pieces in hand: –

9	8	7	6	5	4	3	2	1
香	桂	銀	金	王	金	銀	桂	香	1
	飛						角		2
歩		歩	歩	歩	歩	歩	歩	歩	3
									4
	歩								5
		歩					歩		6
歩	歩		歩	歩	歩	歩		歩	7
	角						飛		8
香	桂	銀	金	玉	金	銀	桂	香	9

☗ pieces in hand: –
2...P-85

2...P-85. After the third move by Black, White has a choice between advancing their rook pawn further (2...P-85) or defending the head of their bishop with a gold (2...G-32) from Black's possible second file pawn attack (which is P-25 aiming for P-24 Px24 Rx24). Among current (2018) professional players, the choice between the two moves is about equal.

The 2...P-85 rook pawn option shown here is more suggestive of a Bishop Exchange opening since White is threatening to exchange eighth file pawns before Black exchanges pawns on the second file which, if allowed by Black, may lead to White gaining the initiative. So, White is forcing Black to decide now on whether to stop the pawn exchange.

White's other option for their second move is 2...G-32. This defensive move is more flexible than 2...P-85 since 2...G-32 does not put pressure on Black to immediately decide on whether to prevent or allow the eighth file pawn exchange leaving the opening still fairly ambiguous. For instance, Black still has time to respond with 3.S-68 (or 3.S-78) for a Fortress opening (meeting 3...P-85 with 4.S-77). And, Black's 3.G-78 response would also still allow for Bishop Exchange (2...G-32 3.G-78 P-85 4.B-77 P-34 5.S-88) and Side Pawn Capture or Double Wing Attack (2...G-32 3.G-78 P-34 4.P-25 P-85 5.P-24 or 2...G-32 3.G-78 P-85 4.P-25 P-86 or 2...G-32 3.P-25 P-85 4.P-24 Px24 5.Rx24 P*23 6.R-26 P-86) openings. More recent authors – such as 長岡 (2015), 小林 (2017), 佐藤 (2017), 塚田 (2018) – have treated 2...G-32 as the main line. At any rate, 2...G-32 easily transposes to the main line shown here.

Note that White can still reject Bishop Exchange by opening their bishop diagonal with 2...P-34 instead of 2...P-85, in which case the opening is likely to become Side Pawn Capture or, possibly, Double Wing Attack (with open bishop diagonals), especially if Black follows 2...P-34 with 3.P-25.

=== Classic (☗3.P-25) vs modern (☗3.B-77) ===
Rook Pawn Push Option
☖ pieces in hand: –

9	8	7	6	5	4	3	2	1
香	桂	銀	金	王	金	銀	桂	香	1
	飛						角		2
歩		歩	歩	歩	歩	歩	歩	歩	3
									4
	歩						歩		5
		歩							6
歩	歩		歩	歩	歩	歩		歩	7
	角						飛		8
香	桂	銀	金	玉	金	銀	桂	香	9

☗ pieces in hand: –
Bishop Defense Option
☖ pieces in hand: –

9	8	7	6	5	4	3	2	1
香	桂	銀	金	王	金	銀	桂	香	1
	飛						角		2
歩		歩	歩	歩	歩	歩	歩	歩	3
									4
	歩								5
		歩					歩		6
歩	歩	角	歩	歩	歩	歩		歩	7
							飛		8
香	桂	銀	金	玉	金	銀	桂	香	9

☗ pieces in hand: –

After 1.P-76 P-84 2.P-26 P-85, Black has two main options for Bishop Exchange: a rook pawn push 3.P-25 and the immediate bishop defense of the eighth file 3.B-77.

3.P-25. The older option found in Classic Bishop Exchange games was to advance Black's rook pawn in response to White's 2...P-85 since White's bishop head (that is, the 23 square) is unprotected. (See §Classic Bishop Exchange below.) However, doing so now is a little more suggestive of a Side Pawn Capture opening (or even Double Wing Attack) in professional play since modern Bishop Exchange openings generally delay another second file pawn push for later in the game.

Nonetheless, although currently not as popular, some professional players have played these positions 2015–2019 aiming for the new P-25 G-48 R-29 Reclining Silver formation.

Another feature of 3.P-25 is that it prevents White from playing Snowroof after declining the Bishop Exchange lines, which has become more popular after 2016. (See: §White's Bishop Exchange Declined.)

3.B-77. This move started to become more popular among professional players in the 1980s and 1990s and is now the main book line. (See: §Delayed rook pawn below.) It immediately prevents White's ...P-86 attack that aims to trade off White's eighth file rook pawn. Moving the bishop while keeping the rook pawn on the 26 square allows for the future possibility of Black jumping their knight to the 25 square (from the 37 square).

Black, of course, is also free to deviate from Bishop Exchange entirely and choose Side Pawn Capture or Double Wing Attack by allowing White to trade off the eighth file pawns, in which case Black will play 3.P-25 followed by 4.G-78.

==== Delayed rook pawn (☗3.B-77) ====
Bishop Exchange
up to move 5
☖ pieces in hand: –

9	8	7	6	5	4	3	2	1
香	桂	銀	金	王	金	銀	桂	香	1
	飛						角		2
歩		歩	歩	歩	歩	歩	歩	歩	3
									4
	歩								5
		歩					歩		6
歩	歩	角	歩	歩	歩	歩		歩	7
							飛		8
香	桂	銀	金	玉	金	銀	桂	香	9

☗ pieces in hand: –
3.B-77

3.B-77. In modern Bishop Exchange openings, Black moves their bishop to the 77 square in order to prevent White from exchanging pawns on the eighth file instead of 3.P-25. This delay of advancing their rook pawn in favor of an immediate defense of the eighth file is known as 飛車先保留 (hisha saki ryūgata) in Japanese. (Note: Note: this delay is also found in modern Double Fortress games as well even to the point of not moving the rook pawn up to 26 early (under the term 飛車先不突き矢倉 hisha saki futsuki yagura).) Additionally, the delay may become an omission (that is, P-25 is never played) in some variations.

N25 Knight Jump Example
☖ pieces in hand: 角

9	8	7	6	5	4	3	2	1
香	桂						桂	香	1
	飛				金	金	王		2
				歩		銀	歩		3
歩		歩	歩	銀	歩	歩		歩	4
	歩						桂		5
歩		歩	歩	銀	歩	歩	歩	歩	6
	歩	銀		歩					7
	玉	金		金	飛				8
香	桂							香	9

☗ pieces in hand: 角
Used with a Reclining Silver (G58) Right Fourth File Rook attack

Waiting to push the rook pawn again is more flexible in that allows Black to position their right knight on the 25 square later in the opening (often with a Reclining Silver attack), which is not possible if the rook pawn is already positioned on that square. An example of a N-25 position is shown in the adjacent diagram. Thus, 2.P-25 narrows the opening possibilities for Black.

Additionally, since 2.P-25 is required in the Climbing Silver and Rushing Silver attacks, it may give White a slight hint that Black is considering these strategies, which might not be desirable so early in the opening. Delaying the rook pawn in favor of making other developments, Black's Reclining Silver formation is able to respond to White's Climbing Silver, Rushing Silver, and Reclining Silver attacks more effectively whereas Black's Reclining Silver may have trouble against White's Climbing Silver (which is a fast attack) when Black spends one tempo for the 2.P-25 variation.

Finally, keeping a pawn on 26 prevents White from dropping a bishop to that square, which could be a possible counterattack should Black's rook leave the second file.

Of course, Black can play P-25 anytime later in the game if desired (which may end up making the delayed rook push merely a transposition of some lines with the early 3.P-25).

One consequence of playing 2.B-77 is that without Black's pressuring P-25 White can decline Bishop Exchange and choose a Snowroof opening.

If Black does not defend the eighth file with the bishop now, then White will likely obtain a pawn in hand. For instance, 3.G-78 is followed by 3...P-86 4.Px86 Rx86 5.P-25 G-32 6.P-24 Px24 7.Rx24 P*23 8.R-26 – a Double Wing Attack opening.

Bishop Exchange
up to move 6
☖ pieces in hand: –

9	8	7	6	5	4	3	2	1
香	桂	銀	金	王	金	銀	桂	香	1
	飛						角		2
歩		歩	歩	歩	歩		歩	歩	3
						歩			4
	歩								5
		歩					歩		6
歩	歩	角	歩	歩	歩	歩		歩	7
							飛		8
香	桂	銀	金	玉	金	銀	桂	香	9

☗ pieces in hand: –
3...P-34

3...P-34. White opens their bishop diagonal attacking Black's bishop on 77, which is in a vulnerable position since Black's bishop diagonal is also open.

This is a forcing move since Black must respond now with their left silver if Black wants to prevent a pawn exchange on the eighth file.

Transposition
☖ pieces in hand: –

9	8	7	6	5	4	3	2	1
香	桂	銀	金	王		銀	桂	香	1
	飛					金	角		2
歩		歩	歩	歩	歩		歩	歩	3
						歩			4
	歩								5
		歩					歩		6
歩	歩	角	歩	歩	歩	歩		歩	7
		金					飛		8
香	桂	銀		玉	金	銀	桂	香	9

☗ pieces in hand: –
3...G-32 4.G-78 5.P-34

Another common move by professionals is for White to delay this forcing move and play 3...G-32 first instead of an immediate 3...P-34. Both White and Black will often move their left golds at some point anyway (although it is also possible that either player will not move their golds forgoing king safety for a quicker attack). Thus, 3...G-32 is usually met with Black's 4.G-78 (although Black could also play an early 4.P-25 or an anticipatory 4.S-88), which may be followed by 4...P-34. This 3...G-32 4.G-78 P-34 transposition sequence is treated as the book line in some Bishop Exchange books (also including the 2...G-32 3.G-78 P-85 4.B-77 P-34 transposition).

Bishop Exchange
up to move 7
☖ pieces in hand: –

9	8	7	6	5	4	3	2	1
香	桂	銀	金	王	金	銀	桂	香	1
	飛						角		2
歩		歩	歩	歩	歩		歩	歩	3
						歩			4
	歩								5
		歩					歩		6
歩	歩	角	歩	歩	歩	歩		歩	7
	銀						飛		8
香	桂		金	玉	金	銀	桂	香	9

☗ pieces in hand: –
4.S-88

4.S-88. Black moves their left silver to defend the bishop. This has been the usual Bishop Exchange move. If the bishop is captured, then the silver can recapture on 77 and still keep White from exchanging pawns on the eighth file as the silver maintains defense of the 86 square.

Before moving the left silver, Black's bishop positioned on 77 is only defended by their left knight. If, for instance, Black were to play 4.P-25 instead, White can now capture the bishop with 4...Bx77+, then Black's knight would be forced to recapture with 5.Nx77. This would leave the eighth file unprotected and allow White to exchange their rook pawn as well (with 5...P-86 6.Px86 Rx86). Therefore, defending the bishop with the silver is important for the defense of the eighth file (as preventing rook pawn exchanges is one of the main points of this opening).

Although Black exchanging the bishops with 4.Bx22+ to get a bishop in hand might seem like a possibility, this would lose tempo causing Black to essentially change to be playing as White. Since the normal development is to allow White to make the exchange, the tempo loss from 4.Bx22+ is unnecessary.

Other Silver Options
☖ pieces in hand: –

9	8	7	6	5	4	3	2	1
香	桂	銀	金	王	金	銀	桂	香	1
	飛						角		2
歩		歩	歩	歩	歩		歩	歩	3
						歩			4
	歩								5
		歩					歩		6
歩	歩	角	歩	歩	歩	歩		歩	7
			銀				飛		8
香	桂		金	玉	金	銀	桂	香	9

☗ pieces in hand: –
4.S-68 (Snowroof)
Other Silver Options
☖ pieces in hand: –

9	8	7	6	5	4	3	2	1
香	桂	銀	金	王	金	銀	桂	香	1
	飛						角		2
歩		歩	歩	歩	歩		歩	歩	3
						歩			4
	歩								5
		歩					歩		6
歩	歩	角	歩	歩	歩	歩		歩	7
		銀					飛		8
香	桂		金	玉	金	銀	桂	香	9

☗ pieces in hand: –
4.S-78 (Fortress/Snowroof/Left Mino)

Although 4.S-88 is the usual move for the left silver, Black has two other choices: 4.S-78 and 4.S-68. When Black chooses 4.S-88 to defend the bishop, this move makes an additional choice of a Fortress opening (which has been a very popular strategy for decades) should White choose to decline the bishop exchange. In this case, Black can develop a Fortress castle by adjusting their configuration although it does prevent a Snowroof castle development. In contrast, 4.S-68 prevents a Fortress development but allows Snowroof. And, 4.S-78 allows for both Fortress and Snowroof castles as well a third Left Mino castle development. If Black aims for a Fortress castle, then 4.S-78 is often not chosen as placing the silver on the seventh file prevents G-78 for a few moves. Of course, if White does make the bishop exchange, then all of 4.S-88/4.S-68/4.S-78 are merely transpositional variants. There is a recent trend to choose 4.S-68 over 4.S-88 since the silver in this position can easily be developed faster if White declines Bishop Exchange and develops a Snowroof position.

Note that Black is not required to play Bishop Exchange at this point. Black also has the choice of closing their bishop diagonal again with 4.P-66 which would prevent White from exchanging the bishops. (However, it is more common to reach this position via other move orders such as 1.P-76 P-34 2.P-26 P-84 3.P-66 P-85 4.B-77.) After this, Black could develop their position into Fortress or into Snowroof.

Bishop Exchange
up to move 9
☖ pieces in hand: –

9	8	7	6	5	4	3	2	1
香	桂	銀	金	王		銀	桂	香	1
	飛					金	角		2
歩		歩	歩	歩	歩		歩	歩	3
						歩			4
	歩								5
		歩					歩		6
歩	歩	角	歩	歩	歩	歩		歩	7
	銀	金					飛		8
香	桂			玉	金	銀	桂	香	9

☗ pieces in hand: –
4...G-32 5.G-78

4...G-32. Although it is possible for White to make a bishop exchange now with 4...Bx77+, usually both players make defensive left gold developments first starting the formation of the Helmet Fortress castle. (Cf. the early 3.P-25 variation where White's ...G-32 is forced and occurs before ...P-34.)

Nonetheless, it is not out of place for White to also make the exchange now with 4...Bx77+, which will then eventually transpose to the main line.

A third option is for White to decline the Bishop Exchange opening by closing their bishop diagonal again with 4...P-44. (See: §White's Bishop Exchange Declined below.) Note that if Black follows with the early 5.P-25 after 4...G-32, then White will no longer be able to decline Bishop Exchange to play Snowroof or Yagura.

5.G-78. Black commonly mirrors White strengthening their defense as well.

Although 5.P-25 is also possible, it would change the variation to the early 3.P-25 line, which had been disfavored for reasons previously stated. (That is, this sequences transposes to 1.P-76 P-84 2.P-26 P-85 3.P-25 G-32 4.B-77 P-34 5.S-88.)

Bishop Exchange
up to move 10
☖ pieces in hand: 角

9	8	7	6	5	4	3	2	1
香	桂	銀	金	王		銀	桂	香	1
	飛					金			2
歩		歩	歩	歩	歩		歩	歩	3
						歩			4
	歩								5
		歩					歩		6
歩	歩	馬	歩	歩	歩	歩		歩	7
	銀	金					飛		8
香	桂			玉	金	銀	桂	香	9

☗ pieces in hand: –
5...Bx77+
Bishop Exchange
up to move 11
☖ pieces in hand: 角

9	8	7	6	5	4	3	2	1
香	桂	銀	金	王		銀	桂	香	1
	飛					金			2
歩		歩	歩	歩	歩		歩	歩	3
						歩			4
	歩								5
		歩					歩		6
歩	歩	銀	歩	歩	歩	歩		歩	7
		金					飛		8
香	桂			玉	金	銀	桂	香	9

☗ pieces in hand:
6.Sx77

5...Bx77+. White makes the bishop trade. This is main point of this opening. It allows both players to gain a bishop in hand early in the game while preventing each player's rook pawn exchange.

Unlike the early 3.P-25 rook pawn push variation, the bishop exchange here is not forced (as there is no immediate threat of Black's rook pawn exchange). However, this is usually the time when White makes the exchange.

There is also a 5...S-42 possibility which usually simply becomes a transposition of the main line. (See: §Black's bishop trade with ☖B22 ☖G32 ☖S42.)

Note that White is recommended to make the bishop exchange (or play 5...S-42) now. The issue that playing another development move like 5...S-62 removes the rook's defense of the gold on 32. Once the rook stops defending the gold, Black can quickly move to the early P-25 lines (5...S-62 6.P-25 Bx77+ 7.Sx77 P-24) where Black is able to trade off their rook pawn but White is not able to do so. (See: §to be written....)

6.Sx77. Black recaptures with the silver maintaining defense of the 86 square (preventing White's pawn exchange). This is the quintessential position of the Bishop Exchange opening.

Although Black has the possibility of recapturing White's 5...Bx77+ with 6.Gx77, professional thought is that having the left gold on the 77 square is a bad shape. With the gold on 77 and the silver still on 88, Black would have no easy way to castle the king. Additionally, a gold on 77 is vulnerable to a future knight fork on ...N-65 forking the 77 and 57 squares and the gold fleeing to 66 to escape the fork would lose much of its defensive features in such a high position and be unable to retreat (unlike a silver on 66 which could retreat/recapture on both 77 and 57).

An important point of this opening is that White has not lost tempo making the exchange. Although the player that initiates a piece exchange in shogi usually has to lose one tempo in order to do so (see: Piece exchange & tempo loss), in this case White's ...P-85 pawn push has forced Black to spend a tempo to defend the eighth file with B-77. Therefore, reaching this position with bishops in hand with White's P85 and Black's S77 has not cost Black or White any tempo compared with the start position. This position can be compared with a similar position reached by 1.P-76 P-84 2.P-26 P-34 3.G-78 Bx88+ 4.Sx88 5.P-85 S-77 G-32. The two positions are identical except that in the book line it is White to play while with the second sequence it is Black to play since White has lost tempo. In this second sequence, White exchanged the bishops on the 88 square before Black moved the 77 square, which caused White to lose tempo but without Black using a tempo for B-77.

Bishop Exchange
up to move 12
☖ pieces in hand: 角

9	8	7	6	5	4	3	2	1
香	桂	銀	金	王			桂	香	1
	飛				銀	金			2
歩		歩	歩	歩	歩		歩	歩	3
						歩			4
	歩								5
		歩					歩		6
歩	歩	銀	歩	歩	歩	歩		歩	7
		金					飛		8
香	桂			玉	金	銀	桂	香	9

☗ pieces in hand:
6...S-42

6...S-42. This move contributes to White's castle development and importantly prepares for ...S-33 to defend the 24 square (preventing the pawn exchange) should Black push P-25. When the silver remains on 42, the king will be castled with ...K-41 and possibly further to ...K-31.

6...S-22 is another possibility. Although S-22 is the required move in the early 3.P-25 variation (so as not to block the rook's defense of the gold on 32), that is not true here since Black's pawn is still on the 26 square (so 7.P-25 is simply met with 7...S-33). Therefore, White has either option.

6...S-42 allows the silver defends more toward the center of White's camp compared with the peripheral ...S-22, which may be favorable when Black does not play P-25. However, 6...S-22 has been played with increasing frequency recently since it protects White's diagonal from Black's future B*55 drop and, thus, allows for White to play P-74 earlier perhaps aiming for a quick Rushing Silver development or even Climbing Silver. (Otherwise, B*55 forks White's rook and left lance when ...S-42 and ...P-74.) When using ...S-22, the king will be placed on the 42 square to protect the center of White's camp in lieu of the silver. The ...S-22 ...K-42 formation has been reevaluated as a good defense when Black's knight jumps early in the opening as is the case in some current developments. (See: §Black's early ☗N-45.)

7.S-38.

7...S-72 or 7...S-62.

===== White's Bishop Exchange Declined (☖...P-44) =====
Closed Diagonal
☖ pieces in hand: –

9	8	7	6	5	4	3	2	1
香	桂	銀	金	王		銀	桂	香	1
	飛					金	角		2
歩		歩	歩	歩			歩	歩	3
					歩	歩			4
	歩								5
		歩					歩		6
歩	歩	角	歩	歩	歩	歩		歩	7
	銀	金					飛		8
香	桂			玉	金	銀	桂	香	9

☗ pieces in hand: –
5...P-44
after 1.P-76 P-84 2.P-26 P-85
3.B-77 G-32 4.G-78 P-34 5.S-88
Closed Diagonal
☖ pieces in hand: –

9	8	7	6	5	4	3	2	1
香	桂	銀	金	王	金	銀	桂	香	1
	飛						角		2
歩		歩	歩	歩			歩	歩	3
					歩	歩			4
	歩								5
		歩					歩		6
歩	歩	角	歩	歩	歩	歩		歩	7
	銀						飛		8
香	桂		金	玉	金	銀	桂	香	9

☗ pieces in hand: –
4...P-44
after 1.P-76 P-84 2.P-26 P-85
3.B-77 P-34 4.S-88

Before making the bishop trade, White has a narrow window during which they can depart from the opening by closing their bishop diagonal with ...P-44 after it has been opened. After they do so, their position can be developed into a Fortress, Snowroof, or Left Mino strategy. Black's position will likely be some form of Fortress since Black's silver is on the 88 square; however, some professional players have also played other unnamed Static Rook positions as Black.

One reason for playing this move is that White may prefer to play Fortress but wishes to play an irregular form of it compared with the standard Fortress lines. Another reason could be that White wishes to avoid the large body of theory associated with Bishop Exchange (or Fortress, which also has a large amount of theory behind it) and so chooses a Snowroof or Left Mino form.

Another note about these positions concerns Black's left silver. 4.S-88 is the most common move in Bishop Exchange. However, as mentioned above, moving the silver to the 88 square will restrict Black to a Fortress position since the silver cannot be moved to 78 for Left Mino or to 67 for Snowroof. (If Black wishes to keep other options open, then either 4.S-78 or 4.S-68 would have needed to be used instead. 4.S-68 is used for Snowroof while 4.S-78 is the most flexible being compatible with Fortress, Snowroof, and Left Mino.)

Bishop Exchange Declined
☖ pieces in hand: –

9	8	7	6	5	4	3	2	1
香	桂	銀	金	王		銀	桂	香	1
	飛					金	角		2
歩		歩	歩	歩			歩	歩	3
					歩	歩			4
	歩						歩		5
		歩							6
歩	歩	角	歩	歩	歩	歩		歩	7
	銀	金					飛		8
香	桂			玉	金	銀	桂	香	9

☗ pieces in hand: –
6.P-25
Bishop Exchange Declined
☖ pieces in hand: –

9	8	7	6	5	4	3	2	1
香	桂	銀	金	王		銀	桂	香	1
	飛					金			2
歩		歩	歩	歩		角	歩	歩	3
					歩	歩			4
	歩						歩		5
		歩							6
歩	歩	角	歩	歩	歩	歩		歩	7
	銀	金					飛		8
香	桂			玉	金	銀	桂	香	9

☗ pieces in hand: –
6...B-33

6.P-25. Once White has declined Bishop Exchange, Black is likely to press forward with a rook pawn aiming to exchange off their second file pawn.

If instead Black chooses another development such as 6.S-48, then White can construct their Fortress castle in the usual fashion with 6...S-42 meeting 7.P-25 with 7...S-33. Since this situation is undesirable, 6.P-25 is played to force White to use the same irregular Fortress construction as Black.

6...B-33. Here White can prevent Black's rook pawn exchange by defending the 24 square with their bishop.

Although 6...G-33 would also prevent the pawn exchange, the gold on 33 is thought to be a bad configuration. (Cf. the comment on the similar G77 form on move 6.Sx77 above.)

====== White's Fortress ======
Fortress
☖ pieces in hand: –

9	8	7	6	5	4	3	2	1
香	桂	銀	金	王		銀	桂	香	1
	飛					金			2
歩		歩	歩	歩		角	歩	歩	3
					歩	歩			4
	歩						歩		5
		歩							6
歩	歩	角	歩	歩	歩	歩		歩	7
	銀	金					飛		8
香	桂			玉	金	銀	桂	香	9

☗ pieces in hand: –
6...B-33

====== Snowroof ======
Snowroof
☖ pieces in hand: –

9	8	7	6	5	4	3	2	1
香	桂	銀	金	王		銀	桂	香	1
	飛					金			2
歩		歩	歩	歩		角	歩	歩	3
					歩	歩			4
	歩						歩		5
		歩							6
歩	歩	角	歩	歩	歩	歩		歩	7
	銀	金					飛		8
香	桂			玉	金	銀	桂	香	9

☗ pieces in hand: –
6...B-33

Here White has closed their bishop diagonal (...P-44) and prevented the second file pawn exchange with 6...B-33.

If White is aiming for Fortress, 6...B-33 is very likely. But, if Snowroof is the aim, White can also play Snowroof lines that do not stop the pawn exchange, in which case White will play 6...S-42 instead. Then, the pawn exchange 7.P-24 Px24 8.Rx24 is met with 8...S-43, in which the silver protects the pawns on the 34 and 44 squares. However, Yasuhiro Masuda suggests that these are difficult lines and recommends 6...B-33 in spite of the fact that computer shogi engines often play 6...S-42.

Snowroof
☖ pieces in hand: –

9	8	7	6	5	4	3	2	1
香	桂	銀	金	王			桂	香	1
	飛				銀	金			2
歩		歩	歩	歩		角	歩	歩	3
					歩	歩			4
	歩						歩		5
		歩							6
歩	歩	角	歩	歩	歩	歩		歩	7
	銀	金			銀		飛		8
香	桂			玉	金		桂	香	9

☗ pieces in hand: –
7.S-48 S-42
Snowroof
☖ pieces in hand: –

9	8	7	6	5	4	3	2	1
香	桂	銀	金	王			桂	香	1
	飛					金			2
歩		歩	歩	歩	銀	角	歩	歩	3
					歩	歩			4
	歩						歩		5
		歩							6
歩	歩	角	歩	歩	歩	歩		歩	7
	銀	金			銀		飛		8
香	桂		玉		金		桂	香	9

☗ pieces in hand: –
8.K-69 S-43

7.S-48. Black develops their right offensive silver.

7...S-42. White develops their left silver up to the fourth file for the castle.

8.K-69. Black starts to castle their king leftward. Since their castle will be a Fortress castle (as their silver is on 88), the king cannot move to the 68 square because this would block the bishop from moving to 68, which is necessary to make way for the silver to move 77 while maintaining defense of the 86 square (to prevent White's rook pawn exchange).

8...S-43. With this White completes the basic shape of the Snowroof castle.

After this Black will need to arrange their pieces to construct the Fortress castle and decide upon an attacking strategy. A common idea is to push the fifth file pawn and aim to exchange off the bishops with their bishop moved back to 68. Another is to push the fourth file pawn for a Reclining Silver formation. Since Fortress requires many moves to construct, Black needs to wary that White may attack first. White can develop their pieces naturally and has various attacking options available to them (e.g. using a traditional Snowroof formation with the right silver on 53 possibly paired with a Right Fourth File Rook attack or a Silver Horns structure with the silver on 63 that could shift to Reclining Silver).

==== Classic Bishop Exchange (☗3.P-25) ====
Classic Bishop Exchange
up to move 5
☖ pieces in hand: –

9	8	7	6	5	4	3	2	1
香	桂	銀	金	王	金	銀	桂	香	1
	飛						角		2
歩		歩	歩	歩	歩	歩	歩	歩	3
									4
	歩						歩		5
		歩							6
歩	歩		歩	歩	歩	歩		歩	7
	角						飛		8
香	桂	銀	金	玉	金	銀	桂	香	9

☗ pieces in hand: –
3.P-25

3.P-25. In Classic Bishop Exchange openings, the natural move after White's P-85 was to likewise advance Black's rook pawn.

This is a forcing move since White must defend their bishop head from this threat (usually by ...G-32). Therefore, Black is not required to immediately protect their eighth file with B-77 making this 3.P-25 possible.

The rook pawn push was considered the correct move at one time due to its forcing nature and it naturally helping develop Black's rook faster. Earlier Bishop Exchange games often used Black's Climbing Silver and Rushing Silver attacks where P-25 will need to be played. However, the rook pawn push at this early juncture began to become disfavored by many professional shogi players since it slows down development of other pieces and eliminates a possible knight jump to the 85 square, which might be used in the Reclining Silver variations, which have become more popular than compared with Bishop Exchange games played before the 1980s.

With the pawn advanced to the middle rank, Black can quickly attack on the second file with P-24 aiming to exchange off the rook pawn. However, the timing of doing so becomes important as there some traps by White if Black attempts to trade off the pawn too early.

With recent revival of Snowroof strategies starting around 2017, 3.P-25 is a new measure by Black to prevent White from playing Snowroof, which is often developed from an initial 3.B-77 Bishop Exchange position when White declines the bishop trade with ...P-44. Thus, 3.P-25 has started to become more common in professional shogi. When Black's rook pawn is already on 25, after 3...G-32 White does not have time to prevent Black's rook pawn exchange with ...B-33 and close the bishop diagonal ...P-44. If White tries to play Snowroof here, then they will be in a situation where Black can trade off their rook pawn but White cannot. Additionally, White does not have time to move their silver to 43 to prevent Black from taking White's side pawn on 44. For example, after 3.P-25 G32 4.B-77 P-34 5.S-88, if 5...P-44 then 6.P-24 Px24 7.Rx24 S-42 8.Rx34; if 5...B-33, then 6.Bx33+; and if 5...S-42, then the game will still be Bishop Exchange with the ☖B22 ☖G32 ☖S42 line.

Classic Bishop Exchange
up to move 5
☖ pieces in hand: –

9	8	7	6	5	4	3	2	1
香	桂	銀	金	王		銀	桂	香	1
	飛					金	角		2
歩		歩	歩	歩	歩	歩	歩	歩	3
									4
	歩						歩		5
		歩							6
歩	歩		歩	歩	歩	歩		歩	7
	角						飛		8
香	桂	銀	金	玉	金	銀	桂	香	9

☗ pieces in hand: –

3...G-32. Since White's bishop diagonal is closed, White must protect their bishop head (the 23 square) from Black's second file pawn attack by moving their gold to the third file.

If White fails to protect 23 and attempts a pawn exchange on the eighth file with 3...P-86 4.Px86 Rx86, then Black would be able to directly attack White's bishop by dropping the pawn in hand with 5.P-24 Px24 6.P*23!. (Cf. the similar case: Double Wing Attack § Blunder: White's failure to defend bishop.)

Of course, White also has another possibility to protect the bishop: 3...P-34 gives the bishop a flight path in the case of Black's P*23 pawn drop. However, the opening could no longer be Bishop Exchange since White now cannot prevent Black's rook pawn exchange with White's silver and instead would transition to Side Pawn Capture or Double Wing Attack (with 3...P-34 4.G-78 G-32).

=== Transpositions ===
The Bishop Exchange position can be reached by several different move orders.

=== Other variations ===
There are also other variations that use different opening move sequences:

- Tempo Loss Bishop Exchange
- Wrong Diagonal Bishop

Other variations:

- Tomioka Bishop Exchange (富岡流 tomioka-ryuu)

==== Black's early ☗N-45 jump ====
Early N-45
☖ pieces in hand: 角

9	8	7	6	5	4	3	2	1
香	桂				王		桂	香	1
	飛			金		金			2
歩		歩	銀	歩	歩	銀	歩		3
			歩			歩		歩	4
	歩				桂		歩		5
		歩			歩	歩		歩	6
歩	歩	銀	歩	歩					7
		金	玉			銀	飛		8
香	桂				金			香	9

☗ pieces in hand: 角
14. N-45
Early N-45
☖ pieces in hand: 角 歩

9	8	7	6	5	4	3	2	1
香	桂				王		桂	香	1
	飛			金		金	銀		2
歩		歩	銀	歩	歩				3
			歩			歩	飛	歩	4
	歩				桂				5
		歩			歩	歩		歩	6
歩	歩	銀	歩	歩					7
		金	玉			銀			8
香	桂				金			香	9

☗ pieces in hand: 角 歩
14... S22

15. P24 Px24

16. Rx24

An early knight attack by Black before developing the usual Reclining, Rushing, or Climbing Silver offense but after seeing White's early Reclining Silver formation.

The attack aims to (i) attack White's silver on 33 forcing it to retreat to 22 or 42 allowing Black to trade off the rook pawn on the second file and (ii) subsequently attack White's undefended rook with a B*71 bishop drop which simultaneously defends the 53 square which is already under attack by Black's knight on 45.

An important point of Black's attack depends on the 53 square being defended by White's single gold on 52 and White's king was castled to 41 since White had played ...S-42 previously.

If White moves their right silver to 62 and keeps it there instead of moving it 72, it defends 53 as well as preventing Black's B*71 drop. Additionally, White could use a ...S-22 form allowing the king to castle to 42 where it also defends 53. (See the discussion of move 6...S-42 in §Delayed rook pawn above.)

== Black's bishop trade with ☖B22 ☖G32 ☖S42 ==
☖B22 ☖G32 ☖S42
☖ pieces in hand: –

9	8	7	6	5	4	3	2	1
香	桂	銀	金	王			桂	香	1
	飛				銀	金	角		2
歩		歩	歩	歩	歩		歩	歩	3
						歩			4
	歩								5
		歩					歩		6
歩	歩	角	歩	歩	歩	歩		歩	7
	銀	金					飛		8
香	桂			玉	金	銀	桂	香	9

☗ pieces in hand: –
Black trades bishops
☖ pieces in hand: –

9	8	7	6	5	4	3	2	1
香	桂	銀	金	王			桂	香	1
	飛				銀	金	馬		2
歩		歩	歩	歩	歩		歩	歩	3
						歩			4
	歩								5
		歩					歩		6
歩	歩		歩	歩	歩	歩		歩	7
	銀	金					飛		8
香	桂			玉	金	銀	桂	香	9

☗ pieces in hand: 角

A less common variation has White move their left silver from the 31 square (where was defending the bishop on 22) to the 42 square instead of making a bishop trade themselves. This positioning leaves the bishop only defended by the gold on 32.

If Black does not respond to this configuration now, White can reject a Bishop Exchange opening with their next move by moving the silver up to 33 where it forms the initial construction of a Fortress castle leading to White's likely Fortress opening where an early bishop trade is no longer possible. Since Black's structure is basically a Bishop Exchange form, transposing to a Fortress position can be awkward. Thus, Black usually initiates the bishop trade at this point. Although this trade losses tempo, White usually must move their gold from 22 back to 32 for proper defense and must, therefore, lose a tempo with this move as well resulting in no overall gain in tempo for White.

== Black's bishop trade with ☗P-25 ==
☗P25
☖ pieces in hand: –

9	8	7	6	5	4	3	2	1
香	桂	銀	金	王	金		桂	香	1
	飛						銀		2
歩		歩	歩	歩	歩	角	歩	歩	3
	歩					歩			4
							歩		5
		歩							6
歩	歩		歩	歩	歩	歩		歩	7
	角				銀		飛		8
香	桂	銀	金	玉	金		桂	香	9

☗ pieces in hand: –
Black trades bishops
☖ pieces in hand: –

9	8	7	6	5	4	3	2	1
香	桂	銀	金	王	金		桂	香	1
	飛						銀		2
歩		歩	歩	歩	歩	馬	歩	歩	3
	歩					歩			4
							歩		5
		歩							6
歩	歩		歩	歩	歩	歩		歩	7
					銀		飛		8
香	桂	銀	金	玉	金		桂	香	9

☗ pieces in hand: 角

Although Bishop Exchange openings are typically characterized by White advancing their rook pawn to the middle rank with P-85, which is the move that triggers Black's B-77 defense in the first place, there is a sort of reverse Bishop Exchange opening where Black advances their rook pawn up the second file to the 25 square, which similarly triggers White to move their bishop to 33. In this case, it is Black (instead of White) that initiates the bishop trade.

== See also ==
- Bishop Exchange Reclining Silver
- Bishop Exchange Climbing Silver
- Bishop Exchange Rushing Silver
- Tempo Loss Bishop Exchange
- Wrong Diagonal Bishop
- Static Rook

== Bibliography ==
- Fairbairn, John (1981). "How to play the reclining silver with bishops off". Shogi (31): 4–6.
- Fairbairn, John (1986). Shogi for beginners (2nd ed.). Ishi Press. ISBN 978-4-8718-720-10.
- Hosking, Tony (1996). "Bishop exchange (kaku kokan): Introduction". The art of shogi. The Shogi Foundation. pp. 123–125. ISBN 978-0-95310-890-9.
- 伊藤, 真吾 [Itō, Shingo] (2019). 角換わり☗４五桂強襲. マイナビ出版.
- 金井, 恒太 [Kanai, Kōta] (2014). "角換わり". ひと目の仕掛け: 相居飛車編. マイナビ. pp. 89–178.
- 勝又, 清和 [Katsumata, Kiyokazu] (2007). "一手損角換わりの話". 最新戦法の話. 浅川書房. pp. 9–32.
- Kitao, Madoka (2011). Joseki at a glance. Translated by Kawasaki, Tomohide. Nekomado. pp. 81–92. ISBN 978-4-9052-2501-0.
- 小林, 裕士 [Kobayashi, Hiroshi] (2017). 角換わりの新常識. マイナビ.
- 小林, 裕士 [Kobayashi, Hiroshi] (2019). とっておきの雁木破り. マイナビ出版. pp. 142–156.
- 長岡, 裕也 [Nagaoka, Yūya] (2015). ひと目の角換わり. マイナビ.
- 佐藤, 慎一 [Satō, Shin'ichi] (2017). "角換わり". 基本戦法まるわかり事典: 居飛車編. マイナビ. pp. 99–134.
- 高橋, 道雄 [Takahashi, Michio] (2018). 将棋の序盤でやってはいけない手. 創元社.
- 塚田, 泰明 [Tsukada, Yasuaki] (2018). 角換わり: 初段の常識. マイナビ出版.
- "ザ・雁木: ▲８八銀 ５六歩型の駒組み". 増田康宏の将棋講座. Episode 2. 2017. 銀河将棋チャンネル – via Niconico.
