= Bishop Exchange, Reclining Silver =

Attacking formation

Bishop Exchange
Double Reclining Silver
☖ pieces in hand: 角

9	8	7	6	5	4	3	2	1
香						王	桂	香	1
	飛			金		金			2
		桂		歩		銀	歩		3
歩		歩	歩	銀	歩	歩		歩	4
	歩						歩		5
歩		歩	歩	銀	歩	歩		歩	6
	歩	銀		歩		桂			7
		金		金			飛		8
香	桂	玉						香	9

☗ pieces in hand: 角

In shogi, Bishop Exchange Reclining Silver or Reclining Silver With Bishops Off or Bishop Exchange Sitting Silver (角換わり腰掛け銀 kakugawari koshikakegin) is a Bishop Exchange (Double Static Rook) opening that uses a Reclining Silver attacking formation.

If both sides play Reclining Silver, then the position is known as Double Reclining Silver or Mutual Reclining Silver or Twin Reclining Silver (相腰掛け銀 aikoshikakegin).

== Overview ==
Reclining Silver configuration
☖ pieces in hand: –

9	8	7	6	5	4	3	2	1
									1
									2
									3
									4
									5
				銀	歩				6
				歩					7
									8
									9

☗ pieces in hand: –
Basic castle form
☖ pieces in hand: –

9	8	7	6	5	4	3	2	1
									1
									2
									3
									4
									5
		歩	歩		歩				6
	歩	銀		歩					7
		金							8
									9

☗ pieces in hand: 角

To defend the left flank against the opponent's rook pawn, Black chooses a Yagura castle form with left silver on the 77 square and the left gold on 78. Then, to avoid the risk of White's bishop drop inside Black's promotion zone, the right gold will be positioned other variously on the 58, 48 or 47 squares.

According to the shogi proverb, "In the Bishop Exchange opening, don't push the central pawn." Following this, the fifth file pawn in Bishop Exchange Reclining Silver must remain on its starting 57 square in order for the right silver to move to 56 by definition. (If the fifth pawn is pushed with P-56, then not only is the shogi proverb violated but also the silver cannot create the Reclining Silver structure.

Insofar as a Rushing Silver strategy by White is less successful against Black's Reclining Silver, White will choose either Climbing Silver or Double Reclining Silver, with the latter being the most common. In turn, White's playing Reclining Silver against Black's Climbing Silver will lose at times. Finally, although Double Rushing Silver occurs sometimes when Black chooses a Rushing Silver strategy, it is more common that White will counter Black's Rushing Silver formation with a Reclining Silver strategy instead.

Although Bishop Exchange positions are similar to Yagura positions in some ways, there is a large difference in how restricted Bishop Exchange position are due to the bishops being in hand. And, since the king safety for both players is not as solid, the backlash for making an attacks can be very serious.

The Kimura joseki is considered the standard joseki for Bishop Exchange, Reclining Silver. Developed in the 1950s and 1960s, following K-88 and K-22 in the accompanying diagram, Black's attacking variations have attained conclusion and it can be said to be a completed joseki, with research ending in Black's victory. In addition, while for Black K-88 is the only option, the reverse version of the Kimura joseki for White exists, and in this one White has the upper hand.

For this reason, Black's king won't enter the castle at K-88, and the Masuda joseki was investigated with the middlegame starting with the king staying at 79. Later on, many Bishop Exchange variations were developed that led to draws by repetition (Sennichite), which ended up in stagnation for a time, until by the end of the 1980s a way out was discovered by deferring the rook pawn in Right Fourth File Rook, and other measures were investigated like pushing White's silver to S-42 to stand by, or sequences to attack the edge with Black's gold at 47. Afterwards, the Masuda style became common once again, and it became a prominent opening for Black, and subsequently Eisaku Tomioka developed the Tomioka variation which ends up in Black's victory (the final position showing White's king in brinkmate, while there's no forced mate for Black's king). Therefore, for White to avoid repetition, N-73 will be put on hold, and the silver will be pushed to 3c before capturing with the pawn at Px25, while Black's bishop at 88 will be exchanged in White's turn, who hence losses one tempo. Because Reclining Silver aims toward this to the end, openings that take advantage of the tempo loss like Climbing Silver and Rushing silver can be used too. Since any variation will end in a total victory for Black in the Tomioka variation, White needs to be on guard.

== Tomioka Bishop Exchange, Reclining Silver ==
Tomioka Bishop Exchange Double Reclining Silver
Initial position
☖ pieces in hand: 歩(4)

9	8	7	6	5	4	3	2	1
香						王	桂	角	1
	飛					金		香	2
		桂	金	歩			歩		3
歩			歩	銀	銀	歩			4
	歩	歩			歩			歩	5
歩			歩	銀					6
	歩	銀		歩		桂			7
		金		金			馬		8
香	桂	玉				飛		香	9

☗ pieces in hand: 歩
Tomioka Bishop Exchange Double Reclining Silver
☖ pieces in hand: 歩(4)

9	8	7	6	5	4	3	2	1
香						王	桂		1
	飛					金	歩	香	2
		桂	金	歩			歩		3
歩			歩	銀	馬	歩			4
	歩	歩			歩			歩	5
歩			歩	銀					6
	歩	銀		歩		桂			7
		金		金					8
香	桂	玉				馬		香	9

☗ pieces in hand: 歩

From the basic diagram, the game can go in many ways. In particular, a number of pawn pushes and sacrifices are possible, namely those pawns in the 4th, 2nd, 1st, 7th, and 3rd files, which the Japanese learn with the acronym ヨニイナサン (yo-ni-i-na-san, after the Japanese name of each number). Eisaku Tomioka developed a variation (角換わり富岡流 kakugawari tomioka-ryū) in which following Black's sacrifices of the fourth, second, first, and seventh file pawns, a final third file pawn is pushed (P-35) with the aim of instigating White to reply with ...Px35, and then jumping the knight to N-45 to break down White's defenses from there. For that reason, following P-35, White plays ...S-44 instead of ...Px35. Next, the joseki continues with Rx24 P*23, R-29, and in order to protect the left knight's head, White defends then by moving the gold to ...G-63.

Then, Black drops a pawn at P*12 Lx12, Px34 B*38, R-39 B-27+, and Black uses Maruyama's new move by dropping the bishop at B*11, after which White will advance the horse to ...+B-28 (see Initial Diagram). From here, Black's rook can escape to R-49 or R-69, but in the Tomioka variation, the Rook is abandoned to capture the silver and promote with Bx44+. Following White's ...+Bx39, Black would attack by dropping the silver at S*33, which generally ends in White's victory. In the Tomioka variation, instead, a pawn is dropped at P*22 (see Diagram), which will be then followed by the silver drop at S*33.

Tomioka won the prestigious Masuda Award in 2016 for the development of this tactic.

== G-48 · R-29 · G-62 · R-81 variation ==
G-48 · R-29 · G-62 · R-81 variation
☖ pieces in hand: 角

9	8	7	6	5	4	3	2	1
香	飛						桂	香	1
			金		王	金			2
		桂		歩	歩	銀	歩		3
歩		歩	歩	銀		歩		歩	4
	歩						歩		5
歩		歩		銀	歩	歩		歩	6
	歩	銀	歩	歩		桂			7
		金	玉		金				8
香	桂						飛	香	9

☗ pieces in hand: 角

== See also ==
- Kimura joseki
- Bishop Exchange
- Reclining Silver
- Bishop Exchange Climbing Silver
- Bishop Exchange Rushing Silver
- Tempo Loss Bishop Exchange
- Wrong Diagonal Bishop Exchange
- Static Rook

== Bibliography ==
- Fairbairn, John (1981). "How to play the reclining silver with bishops off". Shogi (31): 4–6.
- Fairbairn, John (1986). Shogi for beginners (2nd ed.). Ishi Press. ISBN 978-4-8718-720-10.
- Hosking, Tony (1996). The art of shogi. The Shogi Foundation. ISBN 978-0-95310-890-9.
- Kitao, Madoka (2011). Joseki at a glance. Translated by Kawasaki, Tomohide. Nekomado. ISBN 978-4-9052-2501-0.
