= Bishop Exchange, Climbing Silver =

Bishop Exchange
Climbing Silver
☖ pieces in hand: 角

9	8	7	6	5	4	3	2	1
香	桂		金	王			桂	香	1
	飛		銀			金			2
歩			歩	歩	歩	銀	歩	歩	3
		歩				歩			4
	歩						歩		5
		歩					銀		6
歩	歩	銀	歩	歩	歩	歩		歩	7
		金					飛		8
香	桂			玉	金		桂	香	9

☗ pieces in hand: 角

In shogi, Bishop Exchange Climbing Silver (角換わり棒銀 kakugawari bōgin) is a Bishop Exchange (Double Static Rook) opening that uses a Climbing Silver attacking formation with the left silver.

== See also ==
- Bishop Exchange
- Climbing Silver
- Bishop Exchange Reclining Silver
- Bishop Exchange Rushing Silver
- Tempo Loss Bishop Exchange
- Wrong Diagonal Bishop Exchange
- Static Rook

== Bibliography ==
- Hosking, Tony (1996). The art of shogi. The Shogi Foundation. ISBN 978-0-95310-890-9.
- Kitao, Madoka (2011). Joseki at a glance. Translated by Kawasaki, Tomohide. Nekomado. ISBN 978-4-9052-2501-0.
