= Tempo Loss Bishop Exchange =

Tempo Loss Bishop Exchange
up to move 8
☖ pieces in hand: 角

9	8	7	6	5	4	3	2	1
香	桂	銀	金	王		銀	桂	香	1
	飛					金			2
歩		歩	歩	歩	歩		歩	歩	3
	歩					歩			4
							歩		5
		歩							6
歩	歩		歩	歩	歩	歩		歩	7
	馬	金					飛		8
香	桂	銀		玉	金	銀	桂	香	9

☗ pieces in hand: –

In shogi, Tempo Loss Bishop Exchange or One-Move-Loss Bishop Exchange or Bishop Exchange With Tempo Loss (一手損角換わり ittezon kakugawari) is a Bishop Exchange (Static Rook) opening that has White trading the bishops very early in the game before Black's bishop moves up to the 77 square, skipping the usual ...P-85 move. As a result, White loses one tempo, a strategy that used to be thought of as unconceivable, and was only used hesitantly in professional games. In this strategy, the fact that White's pawn remains at 84 instead of moving to P-85 gives White room to jump the knight to 85, which can be used to expand his offensive options or to make it harder for the enemy to target the knight's head at 73, thereby expanding the scope of strategies.

== Overview ==
The Tempo Loss Bishop Exchange opening was developed by retired player Hitoshige Awaji 9-dan for which he was awarded the prestigious Masuda award in 2006. The strategy was popularized by Teruichi Aono, who started playing it after analyzing its use in one of Awaji's matches. This opening became popular among professional players around 2004 and was even played in two of the seven matches for the title of Meijin between Toshiyuki Moriuchi and Yoshiharu Habu in 2005.

Before the emergence of the Tempo Loss Bishop Exchange, some professional players had considered that Bishop Exchange openings led White to be pushed into defensive positions and to be unable to launch more powerful attacks, hence reducing the amount of possibilities available to the White player. Since the Tempo Loss variations of Bishop Exchange prevent White from being pushed to the defensive, this new strategy was quite revolutionary. It was traditionally believed that Black had a slight advantage in professional matches, but in 2008, for the first time since statistics began being recorded, the winning rate of White exceeded that of Black by a small margin of .503 - .497. According to Aono, the most important reason for this was the rise of the Tempo Loss Bishop Exchange strategy.

In the Bishop Exchange opening game, White typically skips pushing their rook pawn to the middle rank (...P-85) and instead trades the bishops off the board early to place them in hand. Before the development of the Tempo Loss variants, no strategy had been developed to follow the tempo loss for White involving the rook file. Specifically, after the tempo loss instead of White advancing the pawn to ...P-85, the strategy developed so as to leave the pawn at P-84, so that the knight can jump to the 85 square if necessary (both for attack purposes and for defense, in case the knight's head on 73 is attacked). This is the gist of the Tempo Loss strategy. Three variants have been developed involving Reclining Silver, Climbing Silver, and Rushing Silver.

== Development ==
There are three conventional methods of Tempo Loss Bishop Exchange: Reclining Silver, Climbing Silver, and Rushing Silver.

=== Reclining Silver ===
Tempo Loss Bishop Exchange, Reclining silver
up to ...N-73
☖ pieces in hand: 角

9	8	7	6	5	4	3	2	1
香						王	桂	香	1
	飛			金		金			2
		桂		歩		銀	歩		3
歩	歩	歩	歩	銀	歩	歩		歩	4
							歩		5
歩		歩	歩	銀	歩	歩		歩	6
	歩	銀		歩		桂			7
		金		金			飛		8
香	桂	玉						香	9

☗ pieces in hand: 角

This position is almost identical to Bishop Exchange, Reclining Silver, but by keeping the pawn at 84 rather than advancing it to 85 a number of attack possibilities involving the knight on 73 are created for White. As is characteristic of Reclining Silver strategies, White's right silver is moved to ...S-54.

Although compared to the traditional P-85 formation White is not actually gaining a tempo in this case, insofar as the possibility of moving expands, this makes it easier to protect against Black's taking unilateral control of the game.

=== Climbing Silver ===
Tempo Loss Bishop Exchange, Climbing Silver
up to ...S-63
☖ pieces in hand: 角

9	8	7	6	5	4	3	2	1
香	桂		金	王			桂	香	1
	飛					金			2
歩		歩	銀	歩	歩	銀	歩		3
	歩		歩			歩		歩	4
							歩		5
		歩					銀	歩	6
歩	歩	銀	歩	歩	歩	歩			7
		金					飛		8
香	桂			玉	金		桂	香	9

☗ pieces in hand: 角

Following the bishop exchange, it is natural for Black to try to take advantage of White's tempo loss with the fast Climbing Silver strategy (which has Black's right silver advanced to the 25 square usually aiming for an edge attack by sacrificing the silver).

=== Rushing Silver ===
Tempo Loss Bishop Exchange, Rushing Silver
up to ...P-85
☖ pieces in hand: 角歩

9	8	7	6	5	4	3	2	1
香	桂		金	王			桂	香	1
	飛					金			2
歩		歩		歩	歩	銀	歩	歩	3
			歩	銀					4
	歩					銀	歩		5
		歩							6
歩	歩		歩	歩	歩			歩	7
	銀	金	玉				飛		8
香	桂				金		桂	香	9

☗ pieces in hand: 角歩

When playing Tempo Loss Bishop Exchange, it used to be the case that both players played Reclining Silver, but since this leaves Black with a small material loss, recently it has been considered that going with a Rushing Silver from a K-78 position is a superior strategy.

== See also ==
- Bishop Exchange
- Bishop Exchange Reclining Silver
- Bishop Exchange Climbing Silver
- Bishop Exchange Rushing Silver
- Wrong Diagonal Bishop Exchange
- Static Rook

== Bibliography ==
- 青野照市 (2009). 後手番一手損角換わり戦法. スーパー将棋講座. 創元社.
- Kitao, Madoka (2011). Joseki at a glance. Translated by Kawasaki, Tomohide. Nekomado. ISBN 978-4-9052-2501-0.
