= Bishop-33 opening =

Shogi opening

Fourth Move B-33
☖ pieces in hand: –

9	8	7	6	5	4	3	2	1
香	桂	銀	金	王	金	銀	桂	香	1
	飛								2
歩	歩	歩	歩	歩	歩	角	歩	歩	3
						歩			4
									5
		歩					歩		6
歩	歩		歩	歩	歩	歩		歩	7
	角						飛		8
香	桂	銀	金	玉	金	銀	桂	香	9

☗ pieces in hand: –
Third Move B-77
☖ pieces in hand: –

9	8	7	6	5	4	3	2	1
香	桂	銀	金	王	金	銀	桂	香	1
	飛						角		2
歩	歩	歩	歩	歩	歩		歩	歩	3
						歩			4
									5
		歩							6
歩	歩	角	歩	歩	歩	歩	歩	歩	7
							飛		8
香	桂	銀	金	玉	金	銀	桂	香	9

☗ pieces in hand: –

In shogi, the Bishop-33 opening (3三角 san-san kaku) is an opening characterized by moving the bishop to the 33 square early while leaving the bishop diagonal opening allowing for an early bishop trade. The opening is flexible in that it can lead to an Opposing Rook (Ranging Rook) position as well as a Static Rook position with or without a bishop trade.

The most common variation and the one used by some professional players is the Fourth Move Bishop-33 opening (4手目3三角戦法 yon-teme san-san kaku senpō). When used by Black, this is known as Third Move Bishop-77 opening (3手目7七角戦法 san-teme nana-nana kaku senpō).

== Fourth Move Bishop-33 ==
Fourth Move B-33
☖ pieces in hand: –

9	8	7	6	5	4	3	2	1
香	桂	銀	金	王	金	銀	桂	香	1
	飛								2
歩	歩	歩	歩	歩	歩	角	歩	歩	3
						歩			4
									5
		歩					歩		6
歩	歩		歩	歩	歩	歩		歩	7
	角						飛		8
香	桂	銀	金	玉	金	銀	桂	香	9

☗ pieces in hand: –
2...B-33

1. P-76 P-34, 2. P-26.

2...B-33. White's bishop moves to the 33 square on the fourth move of the game keeping their bishop diagonal open.

This move invites Black to capture the bishop which is only defended by White's left knight.

=== Black capturing the bishop ===
Fourth Move B-33
☖ pieces in hand: –

9	8	7	6	5	4	3	2	1
香	桂	銀	金	王	金	銀	桂	香	1
	飛								2
歩	歩	歩	歩	歩	歩	馬	歩	歩	3
						歩			4
									5
		歩					歩		6
歩	歩		歩	歩	歩	歩		歩	7
							飛		8
香	桂	銀	金	玉	金	銀	桂	香	9

☗ pieces in hand: 角
3. Bx33+
Fourth Move B-33
☖ pieces in hand: 角

9	8	7	6	5	4	3	2	1
香	桂	銀	金	王	金	銀		香	1
	飛								2
歩	歩	歩	歩	歩	歩	桂	歩	歩	3
						歩			4
									5
		歩					歩		6
歩	歩		歩	歩	歩	歩		歩	7
							飛		8
香	桂	銀	金	玉	金	銀	桂	香	9

☗ pieces in hand: 角
3...Nx33

Fourth Move B-33
☖ pieces in hand: 角

9	8	7	6	5	4	3	2	1
香	桂	銀	金	王	金	銀		香	1
	飛								2
歩	歩	歩	歩	歩	歩	桂	歩	歩	3
						歩			4
							歩		5
		歩							6
歩	歩		歩	歩	歩	歩		歩	7
							飛		8
香	桂	銀	金	玉	金	銀	桂	香	9

☗ pieces in hand: 角
4. P-25
Fourth Move B-33
☖ pieces in hand: 角

9	8	7	6	5	4	3	2	1
香	桂	銀	金	王	金	銀		香	1
							飛		2
歩	歩	歩	歩	歩	歩	桂	歩	歩	3
						歩			4
							歩		5
		歩							6
歩	歩		歩	歩	歩	歩		歩	7
							飛		8
香	桂	銀	金	玉	金	銀	桂	香	9

☗ pieces in hand: 角
4...R-22

== See also ==
- Opposing Rook
- Ranging Rook

== Bibliography ==
- 藤井, 猛. 2008. 相振り飛車を指しこなす本 (Vol. 3). 浅川書房.
- 藤井, 猛. 2008. 相振り飛車を指しこなす本 (Vol. 4). 浅川書房.
- 窪田, 義行. 2008. 変幻自在!!: 窪田流3三角戦法. 毎日コミュニケーションズ.
