= Rushing Silver =

Shogi attacking strategy

Rushing Silver configuration
☖ pieces in hand: –

9	8	7	6	5	4	3	2	1
									1
									2
									3
									4
							歩		5
					銀	歩			6
				歩	歩				7
							飛		8
									9

☗ pieces in hand: –

Rushing Silver (早繰り銀 hayakuri gin, also Rapid Advancing Silver) is a shogi attacking strategy.

Rushing Silver involves advancing the right offensive silver upward through an opening in the pawn line created by a pushed pawn on the third file to rest on the fourth file and subsequently moving the silver diagonally to attack the opponent either on the third file or across the third file to attack on the second file (in which case it appears to be similar formally to the Diagonal Climbing Silver attack used by Static Rook positions against Ranging Rook opponents).

Different Static Rook shogi openings may include a Rushing Silver attack. It is particularly popular to use with the Bishop Exchange opening.

== Example ==
Rushing Silver attack
☖ pieces in hand: –

9	8	7	6	5	4	3	2	1
						王	桂	香	1
				金		金			2
				歩		銀	歩	歩	3
					歩	歩			4
							歩		5
					銀	歩			6
			歩	歩	歩			歩	7
							飛		8
							桂	香	9

☗ pieces in hand: –
Position of Rushing Silver

Rushing Silver attack
☖ pieces in hand: –

9	8	7	6	5	4	3	2	1
						王	桂	香	1
				金		金			2
				歩		銀	歩	歩	3
					歩	歩			4
						歩	歩		5
					銀				6
			歩	歩	歩			歩	7
							飛		8
							桂	香	9

☗ pieces in hand: –
1. P-35

The adjacent diagrams show a possible Rushing Silver attack for Black through the third file and aim to trade off the pawns and silvers on the second file. The opponent (White) has their king partially castled on the 31 square with a variant of the Helmut Yagura castle which is typical of Bishop Exchange positions.

Rushing Silver attack
☖ pieces in hand: 歩

9	8	7	6	5	4	3	2	1
						王	桂	香	1
				金		金			2
				歩		銀	歩	歩	3
					歩				4
						歩	歩		5
					銀				6
			歩	歩	歩			歩	7
							飛		8
							桂	香	9

☗ pieces in hand: –
1...Px35

Rushing Silver attack
☖ pieces in hand: 歩

9	8	7	6	5	4	3	2	1
						王	桂	香	1
				金		金			2
				歩		銀	歩	歩	3
					歩				4
						銀	歩		5
									6
			歩	歩	歩			歩	7
							飛		8
							桂	香	9

☗ pieces in hand: 歩
2. Sx35

Rushing Silver attack
☖ pieces in hand: –

9	8	7	6	5	4	3	2	1
						王	桂	香	1
				金		金			2
				歩		銀	歩	歩	3
					歩	歩			4
						銀	歩		5
									6
			歩	歩	歩			歩	7
							飛		8
							桂	香	9

☗ pieces in hand: 歩
2...P*35

Rushing Silver attack
☖ pieces in hand: –

9	8	7	6	5	4	3	2	1
						王	桂	香	1
				金		金			2
				歩		銀	歩	歩	3
					歩	歩	歩		4
						銀			5
									6
			歩	歩	歩			歩	7
							飛		8
							桂	香	9

☗ pieces in hand: 歩
3. P-24

Rushing Silver attack
☖ pieces in hand: 歩

9	8	7	6	5	4	3	2	1
						王	桂	香	1
				金		金			2
				歩		銀		歩	3
					歩	歩	歩		4
						銀			5
									6
			歩	歩	歩			歩	7
							飛		8
							桂	香	9

☗ pieces in hand: 歩
3...Px24

Rushing Silver attack
☖ pieces in hand: 歩

9	8	7	6	5	4	3	2	1
						王	桂	香	1
				金		金			2
				歩		銀		歩	3
					歩	歩	銀		4
									5
									6
			歩	歩	歩			歩	7
							飛		8
							桂	香	9

☗ pieces in hand: 歩歩
4. Sx24

Rushing Silver attack
☖ pieces in hand: 銀 歩

9	8	7	6	5	4	3	2	1
						王	桂	香	1
				金		金			2
				歩				歩	3
					歩	歩	銀		4
									5
									6
			歩	歩	歩			歩	7
							飛		8
							桂	香	9

☗ pieces in hand: 歩歩
4...Sx24

Rushing Silver attack
☖ pieces in hand: 銀 歩

9	8	7	6	5	4	3	2	1
						王	桂	香	1
				金		金			2
				歩				歩	3
					歩	歩	飛		4
									5
									6
			歩	歩	歩			歩	7
									8
							桂	香	9

☗ pieces in hand: 銀 歩歩
5. Rx24

== Extreme Rushing Silver ==
Professional shogi player, Shin'ichi Satō has developed a set of related strategies known as the Extreme Rushing Silver (極限早繰り銀) opening.

== See also ==
- Bishop Exchange, Rushing Silver
- Climbing Silver
- Reclining Silver
- Shogi opening
- Shogi strategy

== Bibliography ==
- Hosking, Tony (1996). The art of shogi. The Shogi Foundation. ISBN 978-0-95310-890-9.
- Kitao, Madoka (2011). Joseki at a glance. Translated by Kawasaki, Tomohide. Nekomado. ISBN 978-4-9052-2501-0.
- 佐藤, 慎一 [Satō, Shin'ichi]. 2018. 極限早繰り銀. マイナビ出版.
