= Wrong Diagonal Bishop =

Wrong Diagonal Bishop
☖ pieces in hand: 角

9	8	7	6	5	4	3	2	1
香	桂	銀	金	王	金		桂	香	1
	飛						銀		2
歩	歩	歩	歩	歩	歩		歩	歩	3
						歩			4
					角				5
		歩							6
歩	歩		歩	歩	歩	歩	歩	歩	7
							飛		8
香	桂	銀	金	玉	金	銀	桂	香	9

☗ pieces in hand: –

The Wrong Diagonal Bishop or Parallel-Diagonal Bishop (筋違い角 or 筋違角 sujichigai kaku) is a shogi opening characterized by a bishop trade followed by dropping the bishop in hand on the 45 square if played by Black or the 65 square if played by White.

== Introduction ==
Bishop not on usual squares
☖ pieces in hand: 角

9	8	7	6	5	4	3	2	1
	桂		金		金		桂		1
									2
	歩		歩		歩		歩		3
						歩			4
					角				5
		歩							6
	歩		歩		歩		歩		7
									8
	桂		金		金		桂		9

☗ pieces in hand: –
Pawn Fork
☖ pieces in hand:

9	8	7	6	5	4	3	2	1
									1
									2
			歩						3
						歩			4
					角				5
									6
									7
									8
									9

☗ pieces in hand:

The Wrong Diagonal Bishop opening is one of the oldest shogi openings appearing around the same time as the Black's Static Rook vs White's Traditional Ranging Rook type of openings (thus predating other old openings such as Fortress, etc.). The Wrong Diagonal Bishop frequently appears in the recorded handicap games from the Edo period.

The name comes from the bishop being only able to move to squares that are not available from the bishop's start position – thus, the wrong diagonal.

The main point of dropping the bishop is to fork two opponent pawns. Since the opponent is most likely to defend the pawn in their camp, the player can get a material advantage of one pawn. Furthermore, adopting such an early attack can put pressure on their opponent and disturb their normal development in other openings.

After the bishop drop and pawn capture, the player must then contend with whether they will retreat their bishop to the left or right side.

Bishop Exchange Variation
☖ pieces in hand: 角

9	8	7	6	5	4	3	2	1
香	桂	銀	金	王			桂	香	1
	飛					金	銀		2
歩		歩	歩	歩	歩		歩	歩	3
						歩			4
	歩				角		歩		5
		歩							6
歩	歩	銀	歩	歩	歩	歩		歩	7
							飛		8
香	桂		金	玉	金	銀	桂	香	9

☗ pieces in hand: –
Primitive Variation
☖ pieces in hand: 角

9	8	7	6	5	4	3	2	1
香	桂	銀	金	王	金		桂	香	1
	飛						銀		2
歩	歩	歩	歩	歩	歩		歩	歩	3
						歩			4
					角				5
		歩							6
歩	歩		歩	歩	歩	歩	歩	歩	7
							飛		8
香	桂	銀	金	玉	金	銀	桂	香	9

☗ pieces in hand: –

There are two main types of Wrong Diagonal Bishop openings. One variation stems from the Bishop Exchange opening, which is a Double Static Rook opening where both players advance their rook pawns and develop their left silvers to prevent each other from trading off their rook pawns. Here the Wrong Diagonal Bishop drop occurs immediately after the bishop trade off.

The other variation – Primitive Wrong Diagonal Bishop (原始筋違い角) – has a very early bishop trade off and subsequent bishop drop. This occurs directly after the players' bishop diagonals are opened after the third move (or the fourth move if played by White). This set of variations leads to more unusual formations in which either player could play alternately a Static Rook or Ranging Rook position. Unlike the first Bishop Exchange variation, this Primitive variation has Black losing tempo.

== Primitive Wrong Diagonal Bishop ==
One of the aims of Primitive Wrong Diagonal Bishop as played by Black is to make it difficult for White to play a standard Ranging Rook strategy as in order to do White's rook must be moved twice (first to the sixth file, then to the fourth file) losing tempo. Otherwise, a Ranging Rook player must spend several moves developing their generals in order to keep their line of pawns defended while also clearing a path on rank 2 for the rook to be swung over to a Ranging Rook file. Needless to say, this second option often leaves White with more limited castle options.

=== Black's variations ===
Most Common First Moves
☖ pieces in hand: –

9	8	7	6	5	4	3	2	1
香	桂	銀	金	王	金	銀	桂	香	1
	飛						角		2
歩	歩	歩	歩	歩	歩		歩	歩	3
						歩			4
									5
		歩							6
歩	歩		歩	歩	歩	歩	歩	歩	7
	角						飛		8
香	桂	銀	金	玉	金	銀	桂	香	9

☗ pieces in hand: –
Early Bishop Trade
☖ pieces in hand: –

9	8	7	6	5	4	3	2	1
香	桂	銀	金	王	金	銀	桂	香	1
	飛						馬		2
歩	歩	歩	歩	歩	歩		歩	歩	3
						歩			4
									5
		歩							6
歩	歩		歩	歩	歩	歩	歩	歩	7
							飛		8
香	桂	銀	金	玉	金	銀	桂	香	9

☗ pieces in hand: 角

Early Bishop Trade
☖ pieces in hand: 角

9	8	7	6	5	4	3	2	1
香	桂	銀	金	王	金		桂	香	1
	飛						銀		2
歩	歩	歩	歩	歩	歩		歩	歩	3
						歩			4
									5
		歩							6
歩	歩		歩	歩	歩	歩	歩	歩	7
							飛		8
香	桂	銀	金	玉	金	銀	桂	香	9

☗ pieces in hand: 角
Bishop Drop
☖ pieces in hand: 角

9	8	7	6	5	4	3	2	1
香	桂	銀	金	王	金		桂	香	1
	飛						銀		2
歩	歩	歩	歩	歩	歩		歩	歩	3
						歩			4
					角				5
		歩							6
歩	歩		歩	歩	歩	歩	歩	歩	7
							飛		8
香	桂	銀	金	玉	金	銀	桂	香	9

☗ pieces in hand: –

After Black's bishop drop, White has several options to defend their central pawn. Three are listed here. Other options are listed in the Double Wrong Diagonal Bishop section below.

Gold Defense
☖ pieces in hand: 角

9	8	7	6	5	4	3	2	1
香	桂	銀		王	金		桂	香	1
	飛			金			銀		2
歩	歩	歩	歩	歩	歩		歩	歩	3
						歩			4
					角				5
		歩							6
歩	歩		歩	歩	歩	歩	歩	歩	7
							飛		8
香	桂	銀	金	玉	金	銀	桂	香	9

☗ pieces in hand: –
Silver Defense
☖ pieces in hand: 角

9	8	7	6	5	4	3	2	1
香	桂		金	王	金		桂	香	1
	飛		銀				銀		2
歩	歩	歩	歩	歩	歩		歩	歩	3
						歩			4
					角				5
		歩							6
歩	歩		歩	歩	歩	歩	歩	歩	7
							飛		8
香	桂	銀	金	玉	金	銀	桂	香	9

☗ pieces in hand: –
Ranging Rook Defense
☖ pieces in hand: 角

9	8	7	6	5	4	3	2	1
香	桂	銀	金	王	金		桂	香	1
			飛				銀		2
歩	歩	歩	歩	歩	歩		歩	歩	3
						歩			4
					角				5
		歩							6
歩	歩		歩	歩	歩	歩	歩	歩	7
							飛		8
香	桂	銀	金	玉	金	銀	桂	香	9

☗ pieces in hand: –

==== Takeichi variation ====
The Takeichi Wrong Diagonal Bishop (武市流 takeichi-ryū) is a variation developed by Saburō Takeichi (武市三郎).

==== Double Wrong Diagonal Bishop ====
B*65 variation
☖ pieces in hand: –

9	8	7	6	5	4	3	2	1
香	桂	銀		王	金		桂	香	1
	飛			金			銀		2
歩	歩	歩	歩	歩	歩		歩	歩	3
						角			4
			角						5
		歩							6
歩	歩		歩	歩	歩	歩	歩	歩	7
							飛		8
香	桂	銀	金	玉	金	銀	桂	香	9

☗ pieces in hand: 歩
B*54 variation
☖ pieces in hand: –

9	8	7	6	5	4	3	2	1
香	桂	銀	金	王	金		桂	香	1
	飛						銀		2
歩	歩	歩	歩	歩	歩		歩	歩	3
				角		歩			4
					角				5
		歩							6
歩	歩		歩	歩	歩	歩	歩	歩	7
							飛		8
香	桂	銀	金	玉	金	銀	桂	香	9

☗ pieces in hand: –
B*85 variation
☖ pieces in hand: –

9	8	7	6	5	4	3	2	1
香	桂	銀	金	王	金		桂	香	1
	飛						銀		2
歩	歩	歩	歩	歩	歩		歩	歩	3
						歩			4
	角				角				5
		歩							6
歩	歩		歩	歩	歩	歩	歩	歩	7
							飛		8
香	桂	銀	金	玉	金	銀	桂	香	9

☗ pieces in hand: –

There are three main variations of Double Wrong Diagonal Bishop.

Takeichi vs Senzaki 1990
☖ pieces in hand: 歩

9	8	7	6	5	4	3	2	1
香	桂	銀		王			桂	香	1
	飛			金		金			2
歩	歩	歩	歩	歩	歩	銀	歩	歩	3
									4
									5
		角		角					6
歩	歩		歩	歩	歩	歩	歩	歩	7
	飛		銀						8
香	桂		金	玉	金	銀	桂	香	9

☗ pieces in hand: 歩

The Double Wrong Diagonal Bishop B*65 variation appears in the Saburō Takeichi vs Manabu Senzaki Meijin ranking tournament on 1990 June 18. After rejecting a bishop trade, Senzaki also captured Takeichi's pawn on the seventh file. Takeichi played an Opposing Rook position with his bishop on the central file.

==== Black's Wrong Diagonal Bishop after White's bishop exchange ====
Uncommon Variant for Black
☖ pieces in hand: –

9	8	7	6	5	4	3	2	1
香	桂	銀	金	王	金		桂	香	1
	飛						銀		2
歩	歩	歩	歩	歩	歩		歩	歩	3
						歩			4
					角				5
		歩					歩		6
歩	歩		歩	歩	歩	歩		歩	7
	銀						飛		8
香	桂		金	玉	金	銀	桂	香	9

☗ pieces in hand: –

It's also possible to play a Wrong Bishop Diagonal opening if White trades off the bishops first. This opening was played by Ryō Shimamoto against Hiroshi Kobayashi in 2016. Presumably, Kobayashi made the bishop trade in order to play a Tempo Loss Bishop Exchange opening. However, Shimamoto foiled Kobayashi's preparation by dropping the bishop to 45 after Kobayashi moved his silver up to 22. This move sequence was 1.P-76 P-34 2.P-26 Bx88+ 3.Sx88 S-22 4.B*45.

=== White's variations ===
Black Plays Static Rook
☖ pieces in hand: –

9	8	7	6	5	4	3	2	1
香	桂	銀	金	王	金	銀	桂	香	1
	飛						角		2
歩	歩	歩	歩	歩	歩		歩	歩	3
						歩			4
									5
		歩					歩		6
歩	歩		歩	歩	歩	歩		歩	7
	角						飛		8
香	桂	銀	金	玉	金	銀	桂	香	9

☗ pieces in hand: –
1. P-76 P-34
2. P-26

==== Bishop trade by White ====
Early Bishop Trade
☖ pieces in hand: 角

9	8	7	6	5	4	3	2	1
香	桂	銀	金	王	金	銀	桂	香	1
	飛								2
歩	歩	歩	歩	歩	歩		歩	歩	3
						歩			4
									5
		歩					歩		6
歩	歩		歩	歩	歩	歩		歩	7
	馬						飛		8
香	桂	銀	金	玉	金	銀	桂	香	9

☗ pieces in hand: –
2...Bx88+
Bishop Fork
☖ pieces in hand: –

9	8	7	6	5	4	3	2	1
香	桂	銀	金	王	金	銀	桂	香	1
	飛								2
歩	歩	歩	歩	歩	歩		歩	歩	3
						歩			4
			角						5
		歩					歩		6
歩	歩		歩	歩	歩	歩		歩	7
	銀						飛		8
香	桂		金	玉	金	銀	桂	香	9

☗ pieces in hand: 角
3. Sx88 B*65

Gold Defense
☖ pieces in hand: –

9	8	7	6	5	4	3	2	1
香	桂	銀	金	王	金	銀	桂	香	1
	飛								2
歩	歩	歩	歩	歩	歩		歩	歩	3
						歩			4
			角						5
		歩					歩		6
歩	歩		歩	歩	歩	歩		歩	7
	銀			金			飛		8
香	桂		金	玉		銀	桂	香	9

☗ pieces in hand: 角
4. G49-58
Pawn Material Gain
☖ pieces in hand: 歩

9	8	7	6	5	4	3	2	1
香	桂	銀	金	王	金	銀	桂	香	1
	飛								2
歩	歩	歩	歩	歩	歩		歩	歩	3
						歩			4
									5
		角					歩		6
歩	歩		歩	歩	歩	歩		歩	7
	銀			金			飛		8
香	桂		金	玉		銀	桂	香	9

☗ pieces in hand: 角
4...Bx76

===== Central pawn push variation =====
☖ pieces in hand: 歩

9	8	7	6	5	4	3	2	1
香	桂	銀	金	王	金		桂	香	1
	飛						銀		2
歩	歩	歩	歩	歩	歩		歩	歩	3
						歩			4
									5
		角		歩			歩		6
歩	歩		歩		歩	歩		歩	7
	銀			金	銀		飛		8
香	桂		金	玉			桂	香	9

☗ pieces in hand: 角

===== Rook pawn push, Opposing Rook variation =====
☗P-25
☖ pieces in hand: 歩

9	8	7	6	5	4	3	2	1
香	桂	銀	金	王	金	銀	桂	香	1
							飛		2
歩	歩	歩	歩	歩	歩		歩	歩	3
						歩			4
							歩		5
		角							6
歩	歩		歩	歩	歩	歩		歩	7
	銀			金			飛		8
香	桂		金	玉		銀	桂	香	9

☗ pieces in hand: 角

==== Bishop trade by Black ====
Ōwaku variation
☖ pieces in hand: –

9	8	7	6	5	4	3	2	1
香	桂	銀	金	王		銀	桂	香	1
	飛					金	角		2
歩	歩	歩	歩	歩	歩		歩	歩	3
						歩			4
									5
		歩					歩		6
歩	歩		歩	歩	歩	歩		歩	7
	角						飛		8
香	桂	銀	金	玉	金	銀	桂	香	9

☗ pieces in hand: –
2...G-32
Ōwaku variation
☖ pieces in hand: –

9	8	7	6	5	4	3	2	1
香	桂	銀	金	王		銀	桂	香	1
	飛					金			2
歩	歩	歩	歩	歩	歩	角	歩	歩	3
						歩			4
							歩		5
		歩							6
歩	歩		歩	歩	歩	歩		歩	7
	角						飛		8
香	桂	銀	金	玉	金	銀	桂	香	9

☗ pieces in hand: –
3. P-25 B-33

This is a variation introduced by professional shogi player Takeshi Ōwaku (大和久彪) in 1937. In contrast to the above, White encourages Black to make the bishop trade instead, which results in White not losing tempo.

Ōwaku variation
☖ pieces in hand: –

9	8	7	6	5	4	3	2	1
香	桂	銀	金	王		銀	桂	香	1
	飛					金			2
歩	歩	歩	歩	歩	歩	馬	歩	歩	3
						歩			4
							歩		5
		歩							6
歩	歩		歩	歩	歩	歩		歩	7
							飛		8
香	桂	銀	金	玉	金	銀	桂	香	9

☗ pieces in hand: 角
4. Bx33+
Ōwaku variation
☖ pieces in hand: 角

9	8	7	6	5	4	3	2	1
香	桂	銀	金	王		銀	桂	香	1
	飛								2
歩	歩	歩	歩	歩	歩	金	歩	歩	3
						歩			4
							歩		5
		歩							6
歩	歩		歩	歩	歩	歩		歩	7
							飛		8
香	桂	銀	金	玉	金	銀	桂	香	9

☗ pieces in hand: 角
4...Gx33

Ōwaku variation
☖ pieces in hand: 角

9	8	7	6	5	4	3	2	1
香	桂	銀	金	王		銀	桂	香	1
	飛								2
歩	歩	歩	歩	歩	歩	金	歩	歩	3
						歩			4
							歩		5
		歩							6
歩	歩		歩	歩	歩	歩		歩	7
	銀						飛		8
香	桂		金	玉	金	銀	桂	香	9

☗ pieces in hand: 角
5. S-88
Ōwaku variation
☖ pieces in hand: –

9	8	7	6	5	4	3	2	1
香	桂	銀	金	王		銀	桂	香	1
	飛								2
歩	歩	歩	歩	歩	歩	金	歩	歩	3
						歩			4
			角				歩		5
		歩							6
歩	歩		歩	歩	歩	歩		歩	7
	銀						飛		8
香	桂		金	玉	金	銀	桂	香	9

☗ pieces in hand: 角
5...B*65

Ōwaku variation
☖ pieces in hand: 歩

9	8	7	6	5	4	3	2	1
香	桂	銀	金	王		銀	桂	香	1
	飛								2
歩	歩	歩	歩	歩	歩	金	歩	歩	3
						歩			4
							歩		5
		角							6
歩	歩		歩	歩	歩	歩		歩	7
	銀					銀	飛		8
香	桂		金	玉	金		桂	香	9

☗ pieces in hand: 角
6. S-38 Bx76

== Wrong Diagonal Bishop Bishop Exchange ==
Bishop Exchange variation
☖ pieces in hand: 角

9	8	7	6	5	4	3	2	1
香	桂	銀	金	王			桂	香	1
	飛					金	銀		2
歩		歩	歩	歩	歩		歩	歩	3
						歩			4
	歩				角		歩		5
		歩							6
歩	歩	銀	歩	歩	歩	歩		歩	7
							飛		8
香	桂		金	玉	金	銀	桂	香	9

☗ pieces in hand: –

The Wrong Diagonal Bishop variation of the Bishop Exchange opening was most popular during the 1950s and was often played by Yasuharu Ōyama and Masao Tsukada.

Unlike the Primitive variations discussed in the earlier sections, the Bishop Exchange variation proceeds like all other Bishop Exchange variations until just after White trades off the bishops. It is at this point that the bishop in hand can be dropped to the wrong diagonal.

Thus, this opening is quite different from the Primitive Wrong Diagonal Bishop in that there is much more piece development preceding the bishop drop. Also, the Wrong Diagonal bishop drop can only be made by Black since Black's pawn on 76 is already defended by the silver on the 77 square, which, needless to say, eliminates the possibility of Double Wrong Diagonal Bishop variations.

== See also ==
- Bishop Exchange

== Bibliography ==
- Fairbairn, John (1980). "The wrong-diagonal bishop". Shogi (23): 18.
- Hodges, George, ed. (1977). "Shogi openings". Shogi (10): 9, 12–13.
- Hodges, George (ed.). "The wrong diagonal 角 part one". Shogi (57): 6–8.
- Hodges, George, ed. (1986). "The wrong diagonal 角 part four". Shogi (60). Translated by Murphy, David: 13–15.
- Hodges, George, ed. (1986). "The wrong diagonal 角 part five". Shogi (61): 16–17, 7.
- Hodges, George, ed. (1986). "The wrong diagonal 角 part six". Shogi (62). Translated by Murphy, David: 13–14, 16.
- Hosking, Tony (1996). The art of shogi. The Shogi Foundation. ISBN 978-0-95310-890-9.
- Kimura, Yoshio (1986). "The wrong diagonal 角 part seven". Shogi (63): 6–7.
- Kitao, Madoka (2011). Joseki at a glance. Translated by Kawasaki, Tomohide. Nekomado. ISBN 978-4-9052-2501-0.
- Naito, Kunio (1985). "The wrong diagonal 角 part two". Shogi (58). Translated by Fairbairn, John: 7–9.
- Naito, Kunio (1986). "The wrong diagonal 角 part three". Shogi (59). Translated by Murphy, David: 15–17.
- 武市 [Takeichi], 三郎 [Saburō] (2003). 武市流力戦筋違い角の極意. 毎日コミュニケーションズ. ISBN 4-8399-1093-6.
