= Hiroshi Kobayashi (shogi, born 1976) =

Japanese shogi player, born 1976

- Native name: 小林裕士
- Born: September 29, 1976 (age 49)
- Hometown: Kyoto Prefecture

Career
- Achieved professional status: April 1, 1997 (aged 20)
- Badge Number: 223
- Rank: 8-dan
- Teacher: Kaishū Tanaka (9-dan)
- Meijin class: C2
- Ryūō class: 5

Websites
- JSA profile page

Hiroshi Kobayashi (小林 裕士, Kobayashi Hiroshi; born September 29, 1976) is a Japanese professional shogi player ranked 8-dan.

== Shogi professional ==
=== Promotion history ===
Kobayashi's promotion history is as follows:

- 6-kyū: 1990
- 1-dan: 1993
- 4-dan: April 1, 1997
- 5-dan: April 1, 2001
- 6-dan: April 5, 2006
- 7-dan: October 12, 2011
- 8-dan: December 12, 2023
