= Bishop Exchange Fourth File Rook =

Bishop Exchange 4th Rook (Black)
☖ pieces in hand: –

9	8	7	6	5	4	3	2	1
香	桂		金		金	銀	桂	香	1
	飛		銀		王		馬		2
歩		歩	歩	歩	歩		歩	歩	3
	歩					歩			4
									5
		歩							6
歩	歩		歩	歩	歩	歩	歩	歩	7
			飛			玉			8
香	桂	銀	金		金	銀	桂	香	9

☗ pieces in hand: 角
Bishop Exchange 4th Rook (White)
☗ pieces in hand: 角

1	2	3	4	5	6	7	8	9
香	桂	銀	金		金	銀	桂	香	9
			玉		飛				8
歩	歩	歩	歩	歩	歩		歩	歩	7
						歩			6
							歩		5
		歩							4
歩	歩		歩	歩	歩	歩		歩	3
	馬		王		銀		飛		2
香	桂	銀	金		金		桂	香	1

☖ pieces in hand: –

In shogi, the Bishop Exchange Fourth File Rook (角交換四間飛車 kaku kōkan shikenbisha) or Open Bishop Diagonal Fourth File Rook (角道オープン四間飛車 kaku michi ōpun shikenbisha) is a Fourth File Rook (Ranging Rook) opening in which the player's bishop diagonal remains open allowing for a bishop exchange to occur early in the opening. Following the bishop exchange, the rook is moved to the Fourth File.

This contrasts with the defensive so-called normal or standard Fourth File Rook that keeps the bishop diagonal closed until the player is ready for a counterattack so that they may avoid rough and tumble battles initiated by their opponent. (See: Types of Ranging Rook.)

Although it is labelled a Fourth File Rook opening, thanks to the bishop exchange the rook can easily switch to the 8th file (for Black) or to the 2nd file (for White), and hence it also keeps some strong elements of Opposing Rook openings.

== Overview ==
In a typical static rook vs. ranging rook game, ranging rook defends from static rook's rook pawn by way of the power of the bishop. In this situation then, with a bishop exchange the rook's pawn can break through and in consequence ranging rook will be at a disadvantage (hence the proverb, "Aim for a bishop exchange against ranging rook"). For this reason ranging rook will attempt to block the bishop's diagonal early, and will enter battle as soon as the king is castled. In Bishop Exchange Fourth File Rook, instead, the bishop's diagonal remains open and the development of the opening occurs following the bishop exchange.

When White (gote) is the one playing ranging rook, the rook moves to 42 without closing the bishop's diagonal. After that, of course, the bishops will be exchanged, and it's possible that the rook will move to the second file, aiming to counterattack against Black's rook pawn.

According to professional player Hirokazu Ueno, this opening has three characteristics. First, thanks to the bishop exchange Black doesn't need to worry for an attack on the bishop's head. Second, the tendency to go for a slow game is strong. Finally, it can be used when playing Black or White. In addition, since ranging rook's natural enemy at large is Static Rook's Bear-in-the-hole castle, with the bishop exchange the horse has to be taken by the silver, which means that static rook won't be able to build Bear-in-the-hole without losing one tempo. Furthermore, even if Bear-in-the-hole is built up, since it makes the silver and golds to lean heavily on one side it becomes really easy for ranging rook to find good places to drop the bishop in hand, and even against the solidness of a Mino castle it becomes easy to wage battle, hence the ranging rook is at advantage.

Moreover, since White's R-42 places the rook temporarily in the fourth file, it becomes a preparation for a powerful counterattack against Black's B*6e. However, this results of course in the waste of one move, and this isn't necessarily satisfactory. Nevertheless, research has shown that there is no problem even if the Black's bishop is dropped at B*6e, thanks to a development by which rook can then move to the 2nd file and hence turn into a Direct Opposing Rook, which became really popular between 2011 and 2013.

An opening to build Bear-in-the-hole from Bishop Exchange Fourth File Rook has also been created, the so called Leghorn Special (白色レグホン・スペシャル hakushoku reguhon supesharu or, most commonly, the abbreviation レグスペ regusupe).

== Craze and Kōzō Masuda Award ==
Chikako Nagasawa had been playing Bishop Exchange Fourth File Rook in female tournaments since 2000, and Nagasawa's fellow countryman Kōichi Kinoshita played it frequently in male tournaments since around 2002. Later on, it started attracting attention when Yoshiyuki Ueyama won against Hiroyuki Miura by using this opening. In addition, according to Ueno, Takeshi Fujii had been exploring novel countermeasures against Anaguma to replace the Fujii System when this opening made its appearance in the world of professional shogi after being popular among college players, and his adoption of the opening caught a lot of attention and produced a craze for the strategy in the subsequent years. Fujii went on to receive the Kōzō Masuda Award for his use of this strategy in 2013.

== Development ==
Bishop Exchange Fourth Rook
☖ pieces in hand: –

9	8	7	6	5	4	3	2	1
香	桂	銀	金	王	金	銀	桂	香	1
	飛						角		2
歩	歩	歩	歩	歩	歩		歩	歩	3
						歩			4
									5
		歩							6
歩	歩		歩	歩	歩	歩	歩	歩	7
	角						飛		8
香	桂	銀	金	玉	金	銀	桂	香	9

☗ pieces in hand: –
Bishop Exchange Fourth Rook
☖ pieces in hand: –

9	8	7	6	5	4	3	2	1
香	桂	銀	金	王	金	銀	桂	香	1
	飛						角		2
歩	歩	歩	歩	歩	歩		歩	歩	3
						歩			4
									5
		歩							6
歩	歩		歩	歩	歩	歩	歩	歩	7
	角		飛						8
香	桂	銀	金	玉	金	銀	桂	香	9

☗ pieces in hand: –

1. P-76 P-34. The most common first two moves in shogi: bishop diagonals are opened.

2. R-68. Black swings their rook to the sixth file on their second turn. This is the characteristic of Bishop Exchange Fourth File Rook.

Traditional Fourth File Rook Instead would have closed their bishop diagonal (2. P-66) in order to prevent White from trading bishops at an inopportune time.

Bishop Exchange Fourth Rook
☖ pieces in hand: –

9	8	7	6	5	4	3	2	1
香	桂	銀	金	王	金	銀	桂	香	1
	飛						角		2
歩		歩	歩	歩	歩		歩	歩	3
						歩			4
	歩								5
		歩							6
歩	歩		歩	歩	歩	歩	歩	歩	7
	角		飛		玉				8
香	桂	銀	金		金	銀	桂	香	9

☗ pieces in hand: –
Bishop Exchange Fourth Rook
☖ pieces in hand: –

9	8	7	6	5	4	3	2	1
香	桂		金	王	金	銀	桂	香	1
	飛		銀				角		2
歩		歩	歩	歩	歩		歩	歩	3
						歩			4
	歩								5
		歩							6
歩	歩		歩	歩	歩	歩	歩	歩	7
	角		飛				玉		8
香	桂	銀	金		金	銀	桂	香	9

☗ pieces in hand: –

White exchanging pawns on the eighth file immediately is a blunder (see below).

Bishop Exchange Fourth Rook
☖ pieces in hand: –

9	8	7	6	5	4	3	2	1
香	桂		金		金	銀	桂	香	1
	飛		銀		王		馬		2
歩		歩	歩	歩	歩		歩	歩	3
						歩			4
	歩								5
		歩							6
歩	歩		歩	歩	歩	歩	歩	歩	7
			飛				玉		8
香	桂	銀	金		金	銀	桂	香	9

☗ pieces in hand: 角
Bishop Exchange Fourth Rook
☖ pieces in hand: 角

9	8	7	6	5	4	3	2	1
香	桂		金		金		桂	香	1
	飛		銀		王		銀		2
歩		歩	歩	歩	歩		歩	歩	3
						歩			4
	歩								5
		歩							6
歩	歩		歩	歩	歩	歩	歩	歩	7
	銀		飛				玉		8
香	桂		金		金	銀	桂	香	9

☗ pieces in hand: 角

=== Blunder: Static Rook's early rook pawn exchange ===
Early Pawn Exchange
☖ pieces in hand: 角

9	8	7	6	5	4	3	2	1
香	桂		金		金		桂	香	1
	飛		銀		王		銀		2
歩		歩	歩	歩	歩		歩	歩	3
						歩			4
									5
	歩	歩							6
歩			歩	歩	歩	歩	歩	歩	7
	銀		飛				玉		8
香	桂		金		金	銀	桂	香	9

☗ pieces in hand: 角 歩
Early Pawn Exchange
☖ pieces in hand: 角 歩

9	8	7	6	5	4	3	2	1
香	桂		金		金		桂	香	1
			銀		王		銀		2
歩		歩	歩	歩	歩		歩	歩	3
						歩			4
									5
	飛	歩							6
歩			歩	歩	歩	歩	歩	歩	7
	銀		飛				玉		8
香	桂		金		金	銀	桂	香	9

☗ pieces in hand: 角 歩

White may opt for an immediate exchange of the eighth-file pawns, but this is a blunder, as Black can place a bishop on 77, forking the rook on 86 and the silver on 22.

Early Pawn Exchange
☖ pieces in hand: 角 歩

9	8	7	6	5	4	3	2	1
香	桂		金		金		桂	香	1
			銀		王		銀		2
歩		歩	歩	歩	歩		歩	歩	3
						歩			4
									5
	飛	歩							6
歩		角	歩	歩	歩	歩	歩	歩	7
	銀		飛				玉		8
香	桂		金		金	銀	桂	香	9

☗ pieces in hand: 歩

== See also ==
- Fourth File Rook
- Quick Ishida
- Cheerful Central Rook

== Bibliography ==
- 上野裕和 (2014), NHK将棋講座 2014年9月号 別冊付録 上野裕和のNHK杯の序盤がわかる! (2) 角交換四間飛車 / ダイレクト向かい飛車, NHK出版
