= Shogi opening sequences =

Below is a list of the more common initial opening move sequences found in professional shogi games.

== First move ==
1.P-76
☖ pieces in hand: –

9	8	7	6	5	4	3	2	1
香	桂	銀	金	王	金	銀	桂	香	1
	飛						角		2
歩	歩	歩	歩	歩	歩	歩	歩	歩	3
									4
									5
		歩							6
歩	歩		歩	歩	歩	歩	歩	歩	7
	角						飛		8
香	桂	銀	金	玉	金	銀	桂	香	9

☗ pieces in hand: –
77.2%
1.P-26
☖ pieces in hand: –

9	8	7	6	5	4	3	2	1
香	桂	銀	金	王	金	銀	桂	香	1
	飛						角		2
歩	歩	歩	歩	歩	歩	歩	歩	歩	3
									4
									5
							歩		6
歩	歩	歩	歩	歩	歩	歩		歩	7
	角						飛		8
香	桂	銀	金	玉	金	銀	桂	香	9

☗ pieces in hand: –
20.8%
1.P-56
☖ pieces in hand: –

9	8	7	6	5	4	3	2	1
香	桂	銀	金	王	金	銀	桂	香	1
	飛						角		2
歩	歩	歩	歩	歩	歩	歩	歩	歩	3
									4
									5
				歩					6
歩	歩	歩	歩		歩	歩	歩	歩	7
	角						飛		8
香	桂	銀	金	玉	金	銀	桂	香	9

☗ pieces in hand: –
1.6%

Out of the 64,046 recorded (mostly) professional games on Kyokumenpedia (局面ペヂィア) as of 2019 Jan 23 spanning the timeframe from the 1600s to 2018, 77.2% started with a bishop pawn opening (P-76) and 20.8% started with a rook pawn opening (P-26). The rook pawn push naturally leads to Static Rook openings; however, it is possible to play a Feint Ranging Rook as well. The bishop pawn push is more flexible and thus more ambiguous about the planned opening information given to White.

A less common first move (1.6% of Kyokumenpedia games) is the king's pawn (P-56). This move often suggests a Ranging Rook opening (Central Rook or Opposing Rook) for Black.

1.P-96
☖ pieces in hand: –

9	8	7	6	5	4	3	2	1
香	桂	銀	金	王	金	銀	桂	香	1
	飛						角		2
歩	歩	歩	歩	歩	歩	歩	歩	歩	3
									4
									5
歩									6
	歩	歩	歩	歩	歩	歩	歩	歩	7
	角						飛		8
香	桂	銀	金	玉	金	銀	桂	香	9

☗ pieces in hand: –
0.08%
1.R-78
☖ pieces in hand: –

9	8	7	6	5	4	3	2	1
香	桂	銀	金	王	金	銀	桂	香	1
	飛						角		2
歩	歩	歩	歩	歩	歩	歩	歩	歩	3
									4
									5
									6
歩	歩	歩	歩	歩	歩	歩	歩	歩	7
	角	飛							8
香	桂	銀	金	玉	金	銀	桂	香	9

☗ pieces in hand: –
0.08%
1.P-16
☖ pieces in hand: –

9	8	7	6	5	4	3	2	1
香	桂	銀	金	王	金	銀	桂	香	1
	飛						角		2
歩	歩	歩	歩	歩	歩	歩	歩	歩	3
									4
									5
								歩	6
歩	歩	歩	歩	歩	歩	歩	歩		7
	角						飛		8
香	桂	銀	金	玉	金	銀	桂	香	9

☗ pieces in hand: –
0.05%

Other first moves are relatively rare and occur less than 0.5% of the time. For instance, the fourth most frequent move is the left edge pawn (P-96), but this only occurs less than 0.1% of the time.

== Second move ==
Just as the most common first moves are 1.P-76 and 1.P-26, the most common first move responses by White are also the rook pawn and bishop pawn pushes.

=== 1. P-76 ===
1.P-76 P-34
☖ pieces in hand: –

9	8	7	6	5	4	3	2	1
香	桂	銀	金	王	金	銀	桂	香	1
	飛						角		2
歩	歩	歩	歩	歩	歩		歩	歩	3
						歩			4
									5
		歩							6
歩	歩		歩	歩	歩	歩	歩	歩	7
	角						飛		8
香	桂	銀	金	玉	金	銀	桂	香	9

☗ pieces in hand: –
56.4%
1.P-76 P-84
☖ pieces in hand: –

9	8	7	6	5	4	3	2	1
香	桂	銀	金	王	金	銀	桂	香	1
	飛						角		2
歩		歩	歩	歩	歩	歩	歩	歩	3
	歩								4
									5
		歩							6
歩	歩		歩	歩	歩	歩	歩	歩	7
	角						飛		8
香	桂	銀	金	玉	金	銀	桂	香	9

☗ pieces in hand: –
42.5%

1.P-76 G-32
☖ pieces in hand: –

9	8	7	6	5	4	3	2	1
香	桂	銀	金	王		銀	桂	香	1
	飛					金	角		2
歩	歩	歩	歩	歩	歩	歩	歩	歩	3
									4
									5
		歩							6
歩	歩		歩	歩	歩	歩	歩	歩	7
	角						飛		8
香	桂	銀	金	玉	金	銀	桂	香	9

☗ pieces in hand: –
0.4%

Out of professional games with the bishop pawn push as the first move (1.P-76), 56.4% had White respond by advancing their bishop pawn (...P-34) and 42.5% responded by advancing their rook pawn (...P-84).

All other second moves (e.g. ...G-32) occur less than 1.1% of the time.

The ...G-32 choice prevents White from making a Boat castle, which is a standard castle used for a Static Rook position against a Ranging Rook opponent, since the Boat castle requires the king to the 32 square while the left gold remains on its starting 41 square. Thus, this move seems to invite Black to play a Ranging Rook position in order to exploit White's more limited piece development. Nonetheless, if Black chooses a Ranging Rook opening, White's gold on 32 can still be used to develop a Silver Crown castle or if Black plays a Bishop-Exchange Ranging Rook opening White can develop a Fortress castle in response with the gold in this position.

=== 1.P-26 ===
1.P-26 P-84
☖ pieces in hand: –

9	8	7	6	5	4	3	2	1
香	桂	銀	金	王	金	銀	桂	香	1
	飛						角		2
歩		歩	歩	歩	歩	歩	歩	歩	3
	歩								4
									5
							歩		6
歩	歩	歩	歩	歩	歩	歩		歩	7
	角						飛		8
香	桂	銀	金	玉	金	銀	桂	香	9

☗ pieces in hand: –
50.8%
1.P-26 P-34
☖ pieces in hand: –

9	8	7	6	5	4	3	2	1
香	桂	銀	金	王	金	銀	桂	香	1
	飛						角		2
歩	歩	歩	歩	歩	歩		歩	歩	3
						歩			4
									5
							歩		6
歩	歩	歩	歩	歩	歩	歩		歩	7
	角						飛		8
香	桂	銀	金	玉	金	銀	桂	香	9

☗ pieces in hand: –
48.7%

1.P-26 G-32
☖ pieces in hand: –

9	8	7	6	5	4	3	2	1
香	桂	銀	金	王		銀	桂	香	1
	飛					金	角		2
歩	歩	歩	歩	歩	歩	歩	歩	歩	3
									4
									5
							歩		6
歩	歩	歩	歩	歩	歩	歩		歩	7
	角						飛		8
香	桂	銀	金	玉	金	銀	桂	香	9

☗ pieces in hand: –
0.3%

Out of the rook pawn (1.P-26) first move games, 50.8% had a rook pawn advance as White's response and 48.7% had a bishop pawn response.

All other second moves (e.g. ...G-32) occur less than 0.5% of the time.

=== 1.P-56 ===
1.P-56 P-34
☖ pieces in hand: –

9	8	7	6	5	4	3	2	1
香	桂	銀	金	王	金	銀	桂	香	1
	飛						角		2
歩	歩	歩	歩	歩	歩		歩	歩	3
						歩			4
									5
				歩					6
歩	歩	歩	歩		歩	歩	歩	歩	7
	角						飛		8
香	桂	銀	金	玉	金	銀	桂	香	9

☗ pieces in hand: –
65.5%
1.P-56 P-84
☖ pieces in hand: –

9	8	7	6	5	4	3	2	1
香	桂	銀	金	王	金	銀	桂	香	1
	飛						角		2
歩		歩	歩	歩	歩	歩	歩	歩	3
	歩								4
									5
				歩					6
歩	歩	歩	歩		歩	歩	歩	歩	7
	角						飛		8
香	桂	銀	金	玉	金	銀	桂	香	9

☗ pieces in hand: –
30.2%

1.P-56 S-62
☖ pieces in hand: –

9	8	7	6	5	4	3	2	1
香	桂		金	王	金	銀	桂	香	1
	飛		銀				角		2
歩	歩	歩	歩	歩	歩	歩	歩	歩	3
									4
									5
				歩					6
歩	歩	歩	歩		歩	歩	歩	歩	7
	角						飛		8
香	桂	銀	金	玉	金	銀	桂	香	9

☗ pieces in hand: –
2.5%
1.P-56 P-54
☖ pieces in hand: –

9	8	7	6	5	4	3	2	1
香	桂	銀	金	王	金	銀	桂	香	1
	飛						角		2
歩	歩	歩	歩		歩	歩	歩	歩	3
				歩					4
									5
				歩					6
歩	歩	歩	歩		歩	歩	歩	歩	7
	角						飛		8
香	桂	銀	金	玉	金	銀	桂	香	9

☗ pieces in hand: –
1.2%

Out of the central pawn (1.P-56) first move games, 65.5% had a bishop pawn advance as White's response, 30.2% had a rook pawn response, 2.5% have silver to 62, and 1.2% advance the central pawn.

All other second moves occur less than 0.6% of the time.

=== 1.P-96 ===
1.P-96 P-34
☖ pieces in hand: –

9	8	7	6	5	4	3	2	1
香	桂	銀	金	王	金	銀	桂	香	1
	飛						角		2
歩	歩	歩	歩	歩	歩		歩	歩	3
						歩			4
									5
歩									6
	歩	歩	歩	歩	歩	歩	歩	歩	7
	角						飛		8
香	桂	銀	金	玉	金	銀	桂	香	9

☗ pieces in hand: –
64.2%
1.P-96 P-84
☖ pieces in hand: –

9	8	7	6	5	4	3	2	1
香	桂	銀	金	王	金	銀	桂	香	1
	飛						角		2
歩		歩	歩	歩	歩	歩	歩	歩	3
	歩								4
									5
歩									6
	歩	歩	歩	歩	歩	歩	歩	歩	7
	角						飛		8
香	桂	銀	金	玉	金	銀	桂	香	9

☗ pieces in hand: –
17.0%

1.P-96 P-94
☖ pieces in hand: –

9	8	7	6	5	4	3	2	1
香	桂	銀	金	王	金	銀	桂	香	1
	飛						角		2
	歩	歩	歩	歩	歩	歩	歩	歩	3
歩									4
									5
歩									6
	歩	歩	歩	歩	歩	歩	歩	歩	7
	角						飛		8
香	桂	銀	金	玉	金	銀	桂	香	9

☗ pieces in hand: –
9.4%
1.P-96 P-14
☖ pieces in hand: –

9	8	7	6	5	4	3	2	1
香	桂	銀	金	王	金	銀	桂	香	1
	飛						角		2
歩	歩	歩	歩	歩	歩	歩	歩		3
								歩	4
									5
歩									6
	歩	歩	歩	歩	歩	歩	歩	歩	7
	角						飛		8
香	桂	銀	金	玉	金	銀	桂	香	9

☗ pieces in hand: –
3.8%

Advancing the left edge pawn is an uncommon first move that like other more common first moves is usually followed by a bishop pawn (64.2%) or rook pawn (17.0%) push.

Less common responses include advancing either edge pawn.

=== First 2-move probabilities ===
Most Common Position
☖ pieces in hand: –

9	8	7	6	5	4	3	2	1
香	桂	銀	金	王	金	銀	桂	香	1
	飛						角		2
歩	歩	歩	歩	歩	歩		歩	歩	3
						歩			4
									5
		歩							6
歩	歩		歩	歩	歩	歩	歩	歩	7
	角						飛		8
香	桂	銀	金	玉	金	銀	桂	香	9

☗ pieces in hand: –
1.P-76 P-34
Second Most Common Position
☖ pieces in hand: –

9	8	7	6	5	4	3	2	1
香	桂	銀	金	王	金	銀	桂	香	1
	飛						角		2
歩		歩	歩	歩	歩	歩	歩	歩	3
	歩								4
									5
		歩							6
歩	歩		歩	歩	歩	歩	歩	歩	7
	角						飛		8
香	桂	銀	金	玉	金	銀	桂	香	9

☗ pieces in hand: –
1.P-76 P-84

Third Most Common Position
☖ pieces in hand: –

9	8	7	6	5	4	3	2	1
香	桂	銀	金	王	金	銀	桂	香	1
	飛						角		2
歩	歩	歩	歩	歩	歩		歩	歩	3
						歩			4
									5
							歩		6
歩	歩	歩	歩	歩	歩	歩		歩	7
	角						飛		8
香	桂	銀	金	玉	金	銀	桂	香	9

☗ pieces in hand: –
1.P-26 P-34
Fourth Most Common Position
☖ pieces in hand: –

9	8	7	6	5	4	3	2	1
香	桂	銀	金	王	金	銀	桂	香	1
	飛						角		2
歩		歩	歩	歩	歩	歩	歩	歩	3
	歩								4
									5
							歩		6
歩	歩	歩	歩	歩	歩	歩		歩	7
	角						飛		8
香	桂	銀	金	玉	金	銀	桂	香	9

☗ pieces in hand: –
1.P-26 P-84

Fifth Most Common Position
☖ pieces in hand: –

9	8	7	6	5	4	3	2	1
香	桂	銀	金	王	金	銀	桂	香	1
	飛						角		2
歩	歩	歩	歩	歩	歩		歩	歩	3
						歩			4
									5
				歩					6
歩	歩	歩	歩		歩	歩	歩	歩	7
	角						飛		8
香	桂	銀	金	玉	金	銀	桂	香	9

☗ pieces in hand: –
1.P-56 P-34
Sixth Most Common Position
☖ pieces in hand: –

9	8	7	6	5	4	3	2	1
香	桂	銀	金	王	金	銀	桂	香	1
	飛						角		2
歩		歩	歩	歩	歩	歩	歩	歩	3
	歩								4
									5
				歩					6
歩	歩	歩	歩		歩	歩	歩	歩	7
	角						飛		8
香	桂	銀	金	玉	金	銀	桂	香	9

☗ pieces in hand: –
1.P-56 P-84

To state it in a different way, the probabilities of these first two-move sequences are shown below along with their log probability. In the adjacent diagrams are the six most common two-move positions.

Sequence	p	ln(p)
1.P-76 P-34	0.4357	–0.831
1.P-76 P-84	0.3283	–1.114
1.P-76 G-32	0.0029	–5.847
1.P-76 P-54	0.0018	–6.331
1.P-76 R-32	0.0015	–6.482
1.P-76 S-62	0.0015	–6.524
1.P-76 R-52	0.0001	–8.870
1.P-76 P-14	0.0001	–8.988
1.P-76 P-74	0.0001	–9.275
1.P-76 P-94	0.0001	–9.275
1.P-76 R-42	0.0001	–9.969
1.P-26 P-34	0.1056	–2.248
1.P-26 P-84	0.1012	–2.290
1.P-26 G-32	0.0007	–7.260
1.P-26 S-62	0.0001	–8.870
1.P-26 R-52	0.0001	–9.121
1.P-56 P-34	0.0103	–4.573
1.P-56 P-84	0.0048	–5.347
1.P-56 S-62	0.0004	–7.848
1.P-56 P-54	0.0002	–8.582
1.P-96 P-34	0.0005	–7.541
1.P-96 P-84	0.0001	–8.870
1.P-96 P-94	0.0001	–9.458
1.R-78 P-84	0.0005	–7.571
1.R-78 P-34	0.0002	–8.502
1.P-16 P-34	0.0004	–7.889
1.P-16 P-84	0.0001	–9.969
1.P-16 P-14	0.0001	–9.969
1.G-78 P-34	0.0003	–8.295
1.G-78 P-84	0.0001	–9.458
1.P-66 P-34	0.0002	–8.428
1.P-36 P-34	0.0002	–8.669
1.P-36 P-84	0.0001	–8.988
1.R-68 P-34	0.0001	–8.988
1.R-68 S-62	0.0001	–9.969
1.R-68 P-84	0.0001	–9.969
1.R-68 P-54	0.0001	–9.969
1.S-48 P-34	0.0002	–8.359
1.R-58 P-34	0.0002	–8.669
1.R-58 P-84	0.0001	–9.681
1.K-68 P-34	0.0001	–9.681

These probabilities highlight how the most common first move from either side are the bishop and rook pawn pushes accounting for over 97% of all games.

== Third move ==
=== 1.P-76 P-34 ===
2.P-26
☖ pieces in hand: –

9	8	7	6	5	4	3	2	1
香	桂	銀	金	王	金	銀	桂	香	1
	飛						角		2
歩	歩	歩	歩	歩	歩		歩	歩	3
						歩			4
									5
		歩					歩		6
歩	歩		歩	歩	歩	歩		歩	7
	角						飛		8
香	桂	銀	金	玉	金	銀	桂	香	9

☗ pieces in hand: –
64.2%
2.P-66
☖ pieces in hand: –

9	8	7	6	5	4	3	2	1
香	桂	銀	金	王	金	銀	桂	香	1
	飛						角		2
歩	歩	歩	歩	歩	歩		歩	歩	3
						歩			4
									5
		歩	歩						6
歩	歩			歩	歩	歩	歩	歩	7
	角						飛		8
香	桂	銀	金	玉	金	銀	桂	香	9

☗ pieces in hand: –
20.1%

2.P-75
☖ pieces in hand: –

9	8	7	6	5	4	3	2	1
香	桂	銀	金	王	金	銀	桂	香	1
	飛						角		2
歩	歩	歩	歩	歩	歩		歩	歩	3
						歩			4
		歩							5
									6
歩	歩		歩	歩	歩	歩	歩	歩	7
	角						飛		8
香	桂	銀	金	玉	金	銀	桂	香	9

☗ pieces in hand: –
5.1%
2.P-96
☖ pieces in hand: –

9	8	7	6	5	4	3	2	1
香	桂	銀	金	王	金	銀	桂	香	1
	飛						角		2
歩	歩	歩	歩	歩	歩		歩	歩	3
						歩			4
									5
歩		歩							6
	歩		歩	歩	歩	歩	歩	歩	7
	角						飛		8
香	桂	銀	金	玉	金	銀	桂	香	9

☗ pieces in hand: –
3.2%

2.P-16
☖ pieces in hand: –

9	8	7	6	5	4	3	2	1
香	桂	銀	金	王	金	銀	桂	香	1
	飛						角		2
歩	歩	歩	歩	歩	歩		歩	歩	3
						歩			4
									5
		歩						歩	6
歩	歩		歩	歩	歩	歩	歩		7
	角						飛		8
香	桂	銀	金	玉	金	銀	桂	香	9

☗ pieces in hand: –
2.5%
2.S-48
☖ pieces in hand: –

9	8	7	6	5	4	3	2	1
香	桂	銀	金	王	金	銀	桂	香	1
	飛						角		2
歩	歩	歩	歩	歩	歩		歩	歩	3
						歩			4
									5
		歩							6
歩	歩		歩	歩	歩	歩	歩	歩	7
	角				銀		飛		8
香	桂	銀	金	玉	金		桂	香	9

☗ pieces in hand: –
1.2%

2.R-68
☖ pieces in hand: –

9	8	7	6	5	4	3	2	1
香	桂	銀	金	王	金	銀	桂	香	1
	飛						角		2
歩	歩	歩	歩	歩	歩		歩	歩	3
						歩			4
									5
		歩							6
歩	歩		歩	歩	歩	歩	歩	歩	7
	角		飛						8
香	桂	銀	金	玉	金	銀	桂	香	9

☗ pieces in hand: –
1.0%
2.P-56
☖ pieces in hand: –

9	8	7	6	5	4	3	2	1
香	桂	銀	金	王	金	銀	桂	香	1
	飛						角		2
歩	歩	歩	歩	歩	歩		歩	歩	3
						歩			4
									5
		歩		歩					6
歩	歩		歩		歩	歩	歩	歩	7
	角						飛		8
香	桂	銀	金	玉	金	銀	桂	香	9

☗ pieces in hand: –
0.9%

Out of the 1.P-76 P-34 professional games, for the third move, Black:

- advances their rook pawn (P-26) 64.2% of the time,
- advances their sixth file pawn (P-66) 20.1% of the time,
- continues pushing their seventh file pawn (P-75) 5.1% of the time,
- advances their left edge pawn (P-96) 3.2% of the time,
- advances their right edge pawn (P-16) 2.5% of the time,
- advances their right silver to the fourth file (S-48) 1.2% of the time,
- moves their rook to the fourth file (R-68) 1.0% of the time, and
- advances their central pawn (P-56) 0.9% of the time.

All other third moves occur 1.7% of the time.

Playing 1.P-76 P-34 2.P-26 results in the same board position as a 1.P-26 P-34 2.P-76 sequence. (See: Transposition (chess).) This is the most commonly encountered 3-move sequence in shogi.

The 1.P-76 P-34 2.P-66 sequence suggests that Black may play a Ranging Rook opening (Opposing, Third File, or Fourth File). (Note: 1.P-76 P-34 2.P-66 can transpose to 1.P-66 P-34 2.P-76, but an opening move of 1.P-66 is rare and 1.P-76 P-34 2. P-66 is 1400 times more common than the transposition. Moreover, 1.P-66 P-34 is more likely to be followed by 2.R-68 instead of 2.P-76.)

However, Fortress or Snowroof are also possible.

The 1.P-76 P-34 2.P-75 sequence strongly suggests that Black will play an Ishida opening (Third File Ranging Rook).

Both the 1.P-76 P-34 2.P-96 and 1.P-76 P-34 2.P-1f sequences with the edge pawn push are relatively noncommittal initial moves by Black. Here, it is as if Black is asking White to determine which opening to play. (These moves also recall the shogi aphorism (将棋の格言 shōgi no kakugen): 手のない時には端歩を突け te no nai toki wa hashifu o tsuke "When there's no (good) move, push an edge pawn".)

1.P-76 P-34 2.P-96 can transpose to 1.P-96 P-34 2.P-76. However, 1.P-96 is an uncommon first move, and 1.P-76 P-34 2.P-96 is 38 times more likely than the transposition.

=== 1.P-76 P-84 ===
2.S-68
☖ pieces in hand: –

9	8	7	6	5	4	3	2	1
香	桂	銀	金	王	金	銀	桂	香	1
	飛						角		2
歩		歩	歩	歩	歩	歩	歩	歩	3
	歩								4
									5
		歩							6
歩	歩		歩	歩	歩	歩	歩	歩	7
	角		銀				飛		8
香	桂		金	玉	金	銀	桂	香	9

☗ pieces in hand: –
52.3%
2.P-26
☖ pieces in hand: –

9	8	7	6	5	4	3	2	1
香	桂	銀	金	王	金	銀	桂	香	1
	飛						角		2
歩		歩	歩	歩	歩	歩	歩	歩	3
	歩								4
									5
		歩					歩		6
歩	歩		歩	歩	歩	歩		歩	7
	角						飛		8
香	桂	銀	金	玉	金	銀	桂	香	9

☗ pieces in hand: –
16.4%

2.P-56
☖ pieces in hand: –

9	8	7	6	5	4	3	2	1
香	桂	銀	金	王	金	銀	桂	香	1
	飛						角		2
歩		歩	歩	歩	歩	歩	歩	歩	3
	歩								4
									5
		歩		歩					6
歩	歩		歩		歩	歩	歩	歩	7
	角						飛		8
香	桂	銀	金	玉	金	銀	桂	香	9

☗ pieces in hand: –
11.7%
2.S-78
☖ pieces in hand: –

9	8	7	6	5	4	3	2	1
香	桂	銀	金	王	金	銀	桂	香	1
	飛						角		2
歩		歩	歩	歩	歩	歩	歩	歩	3
	歩								4
									5
		歩							6
歩	歩		歩	歩	歩	歩	歩	歩	7
	角	銀					飛		8
香	桂		金	玉	金	銀	桂	香	9

☗ pieces in hand: –
7.4%

2.R-78
☖ pieces in hand: –

9	8	7	6	5	4	3	2	1
香	桂	銀	金	王	金	銀	桂	香	1
	飛						角		2
歩		歩	歩	歩	歩	歩	歩	歩	3
	歩								4
									5
		歩							6
歩	歩		歩	歩	歩	歩	歩	歩	7
	角	飛							8
香	桂	銀	金	玉	金	銀	桂	香	9

☗ pieces in hand: –
4.1%
2.G-78
☖ pieces in hand: –

9	8	7	6	5	4	3	2	1
香	桂	銀	金	王	金	銀	桂	香	1
	飛						角		2
歩		歩	歩	歩	歩	歩	歩	歩	3
	歩								4
									5
		歩							6
歩	歩		歩	歩	歩	歩	歩	歩	7
	角	金					飛		8
香	桂	銀		玉	金	銀	桂	香	9

☗ pieces in hand: –
2.6%

2.P-16
☖ pieces in hand: –

9	8	7	6	5	4	3	2	1
香	桂	銀	金	王	金	銀	桂	香	1
	飛						角		2
歩		歩	歩	歩	歩	歩	歩	歩	3
	歩								4
									5
		歩						歩	6
歩	歩		歩	歩	歩	歩	歩		7
	角						飛		8
香	桂	銀	金	玉	金	銀	桂	香	9

☗ pieces in hand: –
1.8%
2.R-68
☖ pieces in hand: –

9	8	7	6	5	4	3	2	1
香	桂	銀	金	王	金	銀	桂	香	1
	飛						角		2
歩		歩	歩	歩	歩	歩	歩	歩	3
	歩								4
									5
		歩							6
歩	歩		歩	歩	歩	歩	歩	歩	7
	角		飛						8
香	桂	銀	金	玉	金	銀	桂	香	9

☗ pieces in hand: –
1.8%

2.P-66
☖ pieces in hand: –

9	8	7	6	5	4	3	2	1
香	桂	銀	金	王	金	銀	桂	香	1
	飛						角		2
歩		歩	歩	歩	歩	歩	歩	歩	3
	歩								4
									5
		歩	歩						6
歩	歩			歩	歩	歩	歩	歩	7
	角						飛		8
香	桂	銀	金	玉	金	銀	桂	香	9

☗ pieces in hand: –
1.4%

Out of 1.P-76 P-84 games, common third moves for Black include:

- (S-68) advancing their left silver to the sixth file (52.3%),
- (P-26) advancing their rook pawn (16.4%),
- (P-56) advancing their central pawn (11.7%),
- (S-78) advancing their left silver to the seventh file (7.4%),
- (R-78) moving their rook to the seventh file (4.1%),
- (G-78) moving their left gold up the seventh file (2.6%),
- (P-16) advancing their right edge pawn (1.8%),
- (R-68) moving their rook to the sixth file (1.8%), and
- (P-66) advancing their sixth file pawn (1.4%).

All other third moves occur 0.5% of the time.

Playing 1.P-76 P-84 2.P-26 results in the same board position as the uncommon 1.P-26 P-84 2.P-76 sequence.

The 1.P-76 P-84 2.S-68 sequence suggests that Black might play a Fortress opening (Static Rook). Although Fortress is very common, the moves could also transition to other Static Rook openings like Bishop Exchange or Snowroof as well as to several Ranging Rook openings. This 3-move sequence is the second most common found in shogi.

=== 1.P-76 G-32 ===
2.P-26
☖ pieces in hand: –

9	8	7	6	5	4	3	2	1
香	桂	銀	金	王		銀	桂	香	1
	飛					金	角		2
歩	歩	歩	歩	歩	歩	歩	歩	歩	3
									4
									5
		歩					歩		6
歩	歩		歩	歩	歩	歩		歩	7
	角						飛		8
香	桂	銀	金	玉	金	銀	桂	香	9

☗ pieces in hand: –
29.1%
2.P-56
☖ pieces in hand: –

9	8	7	6	5	4	3	2	1
香	桂	銀	金	王		銀	桂	香	1
	飛					金	角		2
歩	歩	歩	歩	歩	歩	歩	歩	歩	3
									4
									5
		歩		歩					6
歩	歩		歩		歩	歩	歩	歩	7
	角						飛		8
香	桂	銀	金	玉	金	銀	桂	香	9

☗ pieces in hand: –
20.6%

2.G-78
☖ pieces in hand: –

9	8	7	6	5	4	3	2	1
香	桂	銀	金	王		銀	桂	香	1
	飛					金	角		2
歩	歩	歩	歩	歩	歩	歩	歩	歩	3
									4
									5
		歩							6
歩	歩		歩	歩	歩	歩	歩	歩	7
	角	金					飛		8
香	桂	銀		玉	金	銀	桂	香	9

☗ pieces in hand: –
16.6%
2.R-78
☖ pieces in hand: –

9	8	7	6	5	4	3	2	1
香	桂	銀	金	王		銀	桂	香	1
	飛					金	角		2
歩	歩	歩	歩	歩	歩	歩	歩	歩	3
									4
									5
		歩							6
歩	歩		歩	歩	歩	歩	歩	歩	7
	角	飛							8
香	桂	銀	金	玉	金	銀	桂	香	9

☗ pieces in hand: –
13.1%

White's G-32 is an uncommon second move. Out of 1.P-76 G-32 games, common third moves for Black include:

- (P-26) pushing their rook pawn push (29.1%),
- (P-56) advancing their central pawn (20.6%),
- (G-78) advancing their left gold up the seventh file (16.6%), and
- (R-78) swinging their rook to the seventh file (13.1%).

All other third moves occur 20.6% of the time.

=== 1.P-26 P-84 ===
2.P-25
☖ pieces in hand: –

9	8	7	6	5	4	3	2	1
香	桂	銀	金	王	金	銀	桂	香	1
	飛						角		2
歩		歩	歩	歩	歩	歩	歩	歩	3
	歩								4
							歩		5
									6
歩	歩	歩	歩	歩	歩	歩		歩	7
	角						飛		8
香	桂	銀	金	玉	金	銀	桂	香	9

☗ pieces in hand: –
2.P-76
☖ pieces in hand: –

9	8	7	6	5	4	3	2	1
香	桂	銀	金	王	金	銀	桂	香	1
	飛						角		2
歩		歩	歩	歩	歩	歩	歩	歩	3
	歩								4
									5
		歩					歩		6
歩	歩		歩	歩	歩	歩		歩	7
	角						飛		8
香	桂	銀	金	玉	金	銀	桂	香	9

☗ pieces in hand: –

Out of 1.P-26 P-84 games, common third moves for Black include:

- (P-25) further advancing their rook pawn (93%) and
- (P-76) advancing their bishop pawn (6%).

Other third moves occur less 0.5% of the time.

Playing the uncommon 1.P-26 P-84 2.P-76 sequence results in the same board position as the more common 1.P-76 P-84 2.P-26 sequence.

=== 1.P-26 P-34 ===
2.P-76
☖ pieces in hand: –

9	8	7	6	5	4	3	2	1
香	桂	銀	金	王	金	銀	桂	香	1
	飛						角		2
歩	歩	歩	歩	歩	歩		歩	歩	3
						歩			4
									5
		歩					歩		6
歩	歩		歩	歩	歩	歩		歩	7
	角						飛		8
香	桂	銀	金	玉	金	銀	桂	香	9

☗ pieces in hand: –
85.4%
2.P-25
☖ pieces in hand: –

9	8	7	6	5	4	3	2	1
香	桂	銀	金	王	金	銀	桂	香	1
	飛						角		2
歩	歩	歩	歩	歩	歩		歩	歩	3
						歩			4
							歩		5
									6
歩	歩	歩	歩	歩	歩	歩		歩	7
	角						飛		8
香	桂	銀	金	玉	金	銀	桂	香	9

☗ pieces in hand: –
13.1%

2.S-48
☖ pieces in hand: –

9	8	7	6	5	4	3	2	1
香	桂	銀	金	王	金	銀	桂	香	1
	飛						角		2
歩	歩	歩	歩	歩	歩		歩	歩	3
						歩			4
									5
							歩		6
歩	歩	歩	歩	歩	歩	歩		歩	7
	角				銀		飛		8
香	桂	銀	金	玉	金		桂	香	9

☗ pieces in hand: –
1.2%

Out of 1.P-26 P-34 games, common third moves for Black include:

- (P-76) advancing their bishop pawn (85.4%),
- (P-25) further advancing their rook pawn (13.1%), and
- (S-48) moving their right silver to the fourth file (1.2%).

Other third moves occur 0.3% of the time.

Playing 1.P-26 P-34 2.P-76 transposes to the 1.P-76 P-34 2.P-26 sequence.

=== 1.P-56 P-34 ===
2.R-58
☖ pieces in hand: –

9	8	7	6	5	4	3	2	1
香	桂	銀	金	王	金	銀	桂	香	1
	飛						角		2
歩	歩	歩	歩	歩	歩		歩	歩	3
						歩			4
									5
				歩					6
歩	歩	歩	歩		歩	歩	歩	歩	7
	角			飛					8
香	桂	銀	金	玉	金	銀	桂	香	9

☗ pieces in hand: –
97.6%
2.P-76
☖ pieces in hand: –

9	8	7	6	5	4	3	2	1
香	桂	銀	金	王	金	銀	桂	香	1
	飛						角		2
歩	歩	歩	歩	歩	歩		歩	歩	3
						歩			4
									5
		歩		歩					6
歩	歩		歩		歩	歩	歩	歩	7
	角						飛		8
香	桂	銀	金	玉	金	銀	桂	香	9

☗ pieces in hand: –
0.9%

Out of 1.P-56 P-34 games, the most common third moves for Black include:

- (R-58) moving their rook to the central file (97.6%) and
- (P-76) opening their bishop diagonal (0.9%)

All other third moves occur 1.4% of the time.

=== 1.P-96 P-34 ===
2.P-76
☖ pieces in hand: –

9	8	7	6	5	4	3	2	1
香	桂	銀	金	王	金	銀	桂	香	1
	飛						角		2
歩	歩	歩	歩	歩	歩		歩	歩	3
						歩			4
									5
歩		歩							6
	歩		歩	歩	歩	歩	歩	歩	7
	角						飛		8
香	桂	銀	金	玉	金	銀	桂	香	9

☗ pieces in hand: –
76.5%
2.S-48
☖ pieces in hand: –

9	8	7	6	5	4	3	2	1
香	桂	銀	金	王	金	銀	桂	香	1
	飛						角		2
歩	歩	歩	歩	歩	歩		歩	歩	3
						歩			4
									5
歩									6
	歩	歩	歩	歩	歩	歩	歩	歩	7
	角				銀		飛		8
香	桂	銀	金	玉	金		桂	香	9

☗ pieces in hand: –
11.8%

Out of 1.P-96 P-34 games, the most common third moves for Black include:

- (P-76) opening their bishop diagonal (76.5%) and
- (S-48) moving their right silver to the fourth file (11.8%).

=== First 3-move probabilities ===
Most Common Position
☖ pieces in hand: –

9	8	7	6	5	4	3	2	1
香	桂	銀	金	王	金	銀	桂	香	1
	飛						角		2
歩	歩	歩	歩	歩	歩		歩	歩	3
						歩			4
									5
		歩					歩		6
歩	歩		歩	歩	歩	歩		歩	7
	角						飛		8
香	桂	銀	金	玉	金	銀	桂	香	9

☗ pieces in hand: –
1.P-76 P-34 2.P-26
Second Most Common Position
☖ pieces in hand: –

9	8	7	6	5	4	3	2	1
香	桂	銀	金	王	金	銀	桂	香	1
	飛						角		2
歩		歩	歩	歩	歩	歩	歩	歩	3
	歩								4
									5
		歩							6
歩	歩		歩	歩	歩	歩	歩	歩	7
	角		銀				飛		8
香	桂		金	玉	金	銀	桂	香	9

☗ pieces in hand: –
1.P-76 P-84 2.S-68

Third Most Common Position
☖ pieces in hand: –

9	8	7	6	5	4	3	2	1
香	桂	銀	金	王	金	銀	桂	香	1
	飛						角		2
歩		歩	歩	歩	歩	歩	歩	歩	3
	歩								4
							歩		5
									6
歩	歩	歩	歩	歩	歩	歩		歩	7
	角						飛		8
香	桂	銀	金	玉	金	銀	桂	香	9

☗ pieces in hand: –
1.P-26 P-84 2.P-25
Fourth Most Common Position
☖ pieces in hand: –

9	8	7	6	5	4	3	2	1
香	桂	銀	金	王	金	銀	桂	香	1
	飛						角		2
歩	歩	歩	歩	歩	歩		歩	歩	3
						歩			4
									5
		歩	歩						6
歩	歩			歩	歩	歩	歩	歩	7
	角						飛		8
香	桂	銀	金	玉	金	銀	桂	香	9

☗ pieces in hand: –
1.P-76 P-34 2.P-66

Fifth Most Common Position
☖ pieces in hand: –

9	8	7	6	5	4	3	2	1
香	桂	銀	金	王	金	銀	桂	香	1
	飛						角		2
歩		歩	歩	歩	歩	歩	歩	歩	3
	歩								4
									5
		歩					歩		6
歩	歩		歩	歩	歩	歩		歩	7
	角						飛		8
香	桂	銀	金	玉	金	銀	桂	香	9

☗ pieces in hand: –
1.P-76 P-84 2.P-26
Sixth Most Common Position
☖ pieces in hand: –

9	8	7	6	5	4	3	2	1
香	桂	銀	金	王	金	銀	桂	香	1
	飛						角		2
歩		歩	歩	歩	歩	歩	歩	歩	3
	歩								4
									5
		歩		歩					6
歩	歩		歩		歩	歩	歩	歩	7
	角						飛		8
香	桂	銀	金	玉	金	銀	桂	香	9

☗ pieces in hand: –
1.P-76 P-84 2.P-56

Seventh Most Common Position
☖ pieces in hand: –

9	8	7	6	5	4	3	2	1
香	桂	銀	金	王	金	銀	桂	香	1
	飛						角		2
歩		歩	歩	歩	歩	歩	歩	歩	3
	歩								4
									5
		歩							6
歩	歩		歩	歩	歩	歩	歩	歩	7
	角	銀					飛		8
香	桂		金	玉	金	銀	桂	香	9

☗ pieces in hand: –
1.P-76 P-84 2.S-78
Eighth Most Common Position
☖ pieces in hand: –

9	8	7	6	5	4	3	2	1
香	桂	銀	金	王	金	銀	桂	香	1
	飛						角		2
歩	歩	歩	歩	歩	歩		歩	歩	3
						歩			4
		歩							5
									6
歩	歩		歩	歩	歩	歩	歩	歩	7
	角						飛		8
香	桂	銀	金	玉	金	銀	桂	香	9

☗ pieces in hand: –
1.P-76 P-34 2.P-75

Below are the joint probabilities of these common 3 move sequences along with their log probability. The following table collapses different sequences that result in the same board position. The adjacent diagrams show the eight most common positions found in the game records.

Sequence	p	ln(p)
1.P-76 P-34 2.P-26 / 1.P-26 P-34 2.P-76	0.3699	–00.995
1.P-76 P-34 2.P-66	0.0878	–02.433
1.P-76 P-34 2.P-75	0.0224	–03.801
1.P-76 P-34 2.P-96 / 1.P-96 P-34 2.P-76	0.0145	–04.235
1.P-76 P-34 2.P-16 / 1.P-16 P-34 2.P-76	0.0112	–04.493
1.P-76 P-34 2.S-48 / 1.S-48 P-34 2.P-76	0.0053	–05.235
1.P-76 P-34 2.R-68	0.0046	–05.387
1.P-76 P-34 2.P-56 / 1.P-56 P-34 2.P-76	0.0040	–05.530
1.P-76 P-34 2.Bx22+	0.0022	–06.125
1.P-76 P-34 2.G49-58	0.0017	–06.404
1.P-76 P-34 2.K-68 / 1.K-68 P-34 2.P-76	0.0016	–06.432
1.P-76 P-34 2.B-77	0.0008	–07.116
1.P-76 P-34 2.G-78 / 1.G-78 P-34 P-76	0.0011	–06.848
1.P-76 P-34 2.P-86 / 1.P-86 P-34 2.P-76	0.0003	–08.234
1.P-76 P-34 2.N-77	0.0001	–09.968
1.P-76 P-84 2.S-68	0.1716	–01.763
1.P-76 P-84 2.P-56 / 1.P-56 P-84 2.P-76	0.0433	–03.141
1.P-76 P-84 2.S-78	0.0243	–03.718
1.P-76 P-84 2.R-78 / 1.R-78 P-84 2.P-76	0.0141	–04.259
1.P-76 P-84 2.G-78 / 1.G-78 P-84 2.P-76	0.0085	–04.771
1.P-76 P-84 2.P-16 / 1.P-16 P-84 2.P-76	0.0061	–05.101
1.P-76 P-84 2.R-68 / 1.R-68 P-84 2.P-76	0.0058	–05.151
1.P-76 P-84 2.P-66	0.0046	–05.380
1.P-76 P-84 2.B-77	0.0013	–06.685
1.P-76 P-84 2.P-75	0.0002	–08.428
1.P-76 P-84 2.S-48	0.0001	–09.457
1.P-76 G-32 2.P-26	0.0011	–06.859
1.P-76 G-32 2.P-56	0.0006	–07.462
1.P-76 G-32 2.G-78	0.0005	–07.678
1.P-76 G-32 2.R-78	0.0004	–07.910
1.P-76 P-54 2.P-26	0.0011	–06.862
1.P-76 R-32 2.P-26	0.0005	–07.560
1.P-76 S-62 2.P-26	0.0008	–07.086
1.P-76 R-52 2.P-26	0.0001	–09.313
1.P-76 P-14 2.P-26	0.0001	–09.458
1.P-76 P-74 2.P-26	0.0001	–09.458
1.P-76 P-94 2.P-26	0.0001	–09.969
1.P-76 R-42 2.P-26	<0.0001	–11.067
1.P-26 P-84 2.P-25	0.0915	–02.392
1.P-76 P-84 2.P-26 / 1.P-26 P-84 2.P-76	0.0634	–02.759
1.P-26 P-84 2.G-78 / 1.G-78 P-84 2.P-26	0.0001	–08.870
1.P-26 P-34 2.P-25	0.0138	–04.283
1.P-26 P-34 2.S-48	0.0013	–06.612
1.P-26 P-34 2.P-96	0.0001	–08.869
1.P-26 P-34 2.G49-58	<0.0001	–11.066
1.P-26 G-32 2.P-25	0.0006	–07.511
1.P-26 S-62 2.P-25	0.0001	–08.987
1.P-26 R-52 2.P-25	0.0001	–09.239
1.P-56 P-34 2.R-58 / 1.P-58 P-34 2.P-56	0.0102	–04.587
1.P-56 P-34 2.P-96 / 1.P-96 P-34 2.P-56	0.0001	–09.458
1.P-56 P-84 2.R-58	<0.0001	–10.374
1.P-56 P-84 2.P-96 / 1.P-96 P-84 2.P-56	0.0000	–undefined
1.P-56 S-62 2.P-76 / 1.P-76 S-62 2.P-56	0.0003	–08.068
1.P-56 P-54 2.P-76	0.0003	–08.295
1.P-96 P-34 2.S-48	0.0001	–09.681
1.P-96 P-84 2.P-76 / 1.P-76 P-84 2.P-96	0.0005	–07.601
1.P-96 P-84 2.P-26	0.0001	–09.458
1.P-96 P-94 2.S-48	0.0001	–09.681
1.P-16 P-34 2.P-26	0.0001	–09.457
1.P-16 P-34 2.P-15	0.0000	–undefined
1.P-16 P-84 2.P-26	0.0001	–09.681
1.P-16 P-14 2.P-76	<0.0001	–10.374
1.P-16 P-14 2.P-96	<0.0001	–11.067
1.G-78 P-34 2.P-26	0.0001	–09.457
1.R-78 P-34 2.K-48	0.0001	–08.988
1.P-66 P-34 2.R-68 / 1.R-68 P-34 2.P-66	0.0003	–08.234
1.P-36 P-34 2.R-38	0.0001	–08.867
1.P-36 P-34 2.P-76	<0.0001	–10.374
1.P-36 P-84 2.P-35	0.0001	–08.988
1.R-68 S-62 2.P-66	<0.0001	–10.374
1.R-68 P-54 2.P-76	<0.0001	–10.374
1.S-48 P-34 2.P-56	0.0001	–08.988
1.S-48 P-34 2.P-46	0.0001	–09.681
1.S-48 P-84 2.P-26	<0.0001	–11.067
1.S-48 P-84 2.G-78 / 1.G-78 P-84 2.S-48	0.0000	–undefined
1.R-58 P-84 2.P-76	0.0001	–09.681
1.K-68 P-34 2.K-78	0.0000	–undefined
1.K-68 P-84 2.G-78	0.0000	–undefined
1.P-86 P-84 2.G-78	0.0000	–undefined

== Fourth move ==
=== 1.P-76 P-34 2.P-26 / 1.P-26 P-34 2.P-76 ===
Out of the 1.P-76 P-34 2.P-26 / 1.P-26 P-34 2.P-76 professional games, for the fourth move, White

- advances their fourth file pawn (P-44) 54% of the time,
- advances their rook pawn (P-84) 19% of the time,
- advances their central pawn (P-54) 12% of the time, and
- moves their left gold toward the bishop (G-32) 9% of the time.

Other fourth moves occur 6% of the time.

The 1.P-76 P-34 2.P-26 P-44 and 1.P-26 P-34 2.P-76 P-44 sequences suggest that White will play a Ranging Rook opening.

The 1.P-76 P-34 2.P-26 P-84 and 1.P-26 P-34 2.P-76 P-84 sequences suggest a Side Pawn Capture opening (Double Static Rook).

The 1.P-76 P-34 2.P-26 P-54 and 1.P-26 P-34 2.P-76 P-54 sequences suggest White will play a Central Rook opening (Ranging Rook).

The 1.P-76 P-34 2.P-26 G-32 and 1.P-26 P-34 2.P-76 G-32 sequences suggest White wants to play a Bishop Exchange opening (Double Static Rook).

=== 1.P-76 P-34 2.P-66 ===
Out of 1.P-76 P-34 2.P-66 games, common fourth moves for White include:

- (P-84) advancing their rook pawn (40%),
- (S-62) moving their right silver toward the center (23%),
- (R-32) ranging their rook to the third file (9%), and
- (P-35) further advancing their bishop pawn (8%).

Other fourth moves occur 19% of the time.

The first three moves already suggest that Black will play a Ranging Rook opening.

The 1.P-76 P-34 2.P-66 S-62 sequence suggests that White will play a Static Rook opening.

Both the 1.P-76 P-34 2.P-66 R-32 and 1.P-76 P-34 2.P-66 P-35 sequences suggest that White will also play a Ranging Rook opening (Double Ranging Rook), in particular Third File Rook.

=== 1.P-76 P-34 2.P-75 ===
Out of 1.P-76 P-34 2.P-75 games, common fourth moves for White include:

- (K-42) castling their king toward the bishop (21%),
- (P-84) advancing their rook pawn (17%),
- (P-54) advancing their central pawn (14%), and
- (S-62) advancing their silver up (14%).

Other fourth moves occur 35% of the time.

=== 1.P-76 P-84 2.S-68 ===
Out of 1.P-76 P-84 2.S-68 games, White usually (99%) advances their bishop pawn (P-34).

Other fourth moves occur less than 0.5% of the time.

This 4-move 1.P-76 P-84 2.S-68 P-34 sequence will usually lead to a Fortress opening (just like the first 3 moves) with White threatening Black's bishop. However, it's still possible that Black could transition to a Bishop Exchange or Snowroof opening or a Ranging Rook openings like Central Rook or Opposing Rook. (Third File Rook or Fourth File Rook are less likely here as the silver is blocking the rook from moving to these files.)

=== 1.P-76 P-84 2.P-26 / 1.P-26 P-84 2.P-76 ===
Out of 1.P-76 P-84 2.P-26 / 1.P-26 P-84 2.P-76 games, common fourth moves for White include:

- (P-85) further advancing their rook pawn (62%),
- (G-32) moving their left gold toward the bishop (32%), and
- (P-34) advancing their bishop pawn (5%).

The 1.P-76 P-84 2.P-26 P-34 sequence results in the same board position as the 1.P-76 P-34 2.P-26 P-84, 1.P-26 P-34 2.P-76 P-84, and 1.P-26 P-84 2.P-76 P-34 sequences – all of which suggest a Side Pawn Capture opening (Static Rook).

The 1.P-76 P-84 2.P-26 G-32 and 1.P-26 P-84 2.P-76 G-32 sequences suggest the possibility of a Bishop Exchange opening (Double Static Rook).

=== 1.P-76 P-84 2.P-56 ===
Out of 1.P-76 P-84 2.P-56 games, common fourth moves for White include:

- (P-85) further advancing their rook pawn (59%),
- (P-54) advancing their central pawn (22%), and
- (P-34) advancing their bishop pawn (18%).

Other fourth moves occur 2% of the time.

=== 1.P-76 P-84 2.S-78 ===
Out of 1.P-76 P-84 2.S-78 games, White usually (98% of the time) advances their bishop pawn (P-34).

Other fourth moves occur 2% of the time.

=== 1.P-26 P-84 2.P-25 ===
Out of 1.P-26 P-84 2.P-25 games, White usually (96% of the time) further advances their rook pawn (P-85).

Other fourth moves occur 4% of the time.

This sequence suggests a Double Wing Attack opening (Static Rook). (It's possible that this could also transition to other Static Rook openings.)

=== 1.P-26 P-34 2.P-25 ===
Out of 1.P-26 P-34 2.P-25 games, White usually (97% of the time) moves their bishop to the third file (B-33).

Other fourth moves occur 3% of the time.

=== First 4-move probabilities ===
Below are the joint probabilities for these 4-move sequences.

Sequence	p
1.P-76 P-34 2.P-26 P-44 / 1.P-26 P-34 2.P-76 P-44	0.1990
1.P-76 P-34 2.P-26 P-84 / 1.P-26 P-34 2.P-76 P-84 / 1.P-76 P-84 2.P-26 P-34 / 1.P-26 P-84 2.P-76 P-34	0.1084
1.P-76 P-34 2.P-26 P-54 / 1.P-26 P-34 2.P-76 P-54	0.0430
1.P-76 P-34 2.P-26 G-32 / 1.P-26 P-34 2.P-76 G-32	0.0341
1.P-76 P-34 2.P-66 P-84	0.0372
1.P-76 P-34 2.P-66 S-62	0.0213
1.P-76 P-34 2.P-66 R-32	0.0087
1.P-76 P-34 2.P-66 P-35	0.0075
1.P-76 P-34 2.P-75 K-42	0.0042
1.P-76 P-34 2.P-75 P-84	0.0034
1.P-76 P-34 2.P-75 P-54	0.0028
1.P-76 P-34 2.P-75 P-62	0.0027
1.P-76 P-84 2.S-68 P-34	0.1771
1.P-76 P-84 2.P-26 P-85 / 1.P-26 P-84 2.P-76 P-85	0.0350
1.P-76 P-84 2.P-26 G-32 / 1.P-26 P-84 2.P-76 G-32	0.0182
1.P-76 P-84 2.P-56 P-85	0.0216
1.P-76 P-84 2.P-56 G-32	0.0079
1.P-76 P-84 2.P-56 P-34	0.0064
1.P-76 P-84 2.S-78 P-34	0.0255
1.P-26 P-84 2.P-25 P-85	0.0913
1.P-26 P-84 2.P-76 P-85	0.0041
1.P-26 P-84 2.P-76 G-32	0.0021
1.P-26 P-34 2.P-25 B-33	0.0107

== Bibliography ==
- "Kyokumenpedia" 局面ペディア [Kyokumenpedia]. Kyokumenpedia (in Japanese). Team ISCube. 2016.: Many shogi games (professional, online, AI) put into a decision tree structure with user-generated commentary and references and some opening classifications.
