= Lady Killer Wham-Bam Rook =

Lady Killer Wham-Bam Rook
☖ pieces in hand: –

9	8	7	6	5	4	3	2	1
香	桂		金		金	銀	桂	香	1
	飛		銀			王	角		2
歩		歩	歩	歩	歩		歩	歩	3
						歩			4
	歩								5
		歩							6
歩	歩		歩	歩	歩	歩	歩	歩	7
	角			飛	銀	金	玉		8
香	桂	銀	金				桂	香	9

☗ pieces in hand: –

In the Japanese strategy board game shogi, the Lady Killer Wham-Bam Rook or Lady Killer Rushing Rook (女殺しドッカン飛車 onnagoroshi dokkan hisha) or Oniroku Dan Dokkan Rook (鬼六流ドッカン飛車 or 鬼六流どっかん飛車 dan oniroku-ryuu dokkan hisha) is a surprise opening that was used by BDSM pornography author Oniroku Dan to defeat a woman professional shogi player.

The opening is basically a Ranging Rook opening played against a Static Rook opponent, which plans for an Opposing Rook position with the threat of a bishop trade.

== Initial positioning ==
Lady Killer Wham-Bam Rook
☖ pieces in hand: –

9	8	7	6	5	4	3	2	1
香	桂	銀	金	王	金	銀	桂	香	1
	飛						角		2
歩	歩	歩	歩	歩	歩	歩	歩	歩	3
									4
									5
									6
歩	歩	歩	歩	歩	歩	歩	歩	歩	7
	角			飛					8
香	桂	銀	金	玉	金	銀	桂	香	9

☗ pieces in hand: –
Lady Killer Wham-Bam Rook
☖ pieces in hand: –

9	8	7	6	5	4	3	2	1
香	桂	銀	金	王	金	銀	桂	香	1
	飛						角		2
歩	歩	歩	歩	歩	歩		歩	歩	3
						歩			4
									5
									6
歩	歩	歩	歩	歩	歩	歩	歩	歩	7
	角			飛		金			8
香	桂	銀	金	玉		銀	桂	香	9

☗ pieces in hand: –

1. R-58. The opening starts with an uncommon first move of the rook to the central file.

1. ...P-34. If White opens their bishop diagonal by advancing their third file pawn, then Black may attempt the Lady Killer Wham-Bam Rook opening.

2. G-38. Black's second move is a rare move of the right gold to the third file.

== Further development ==
Lady Killer Wham-Bam Rook
☖ pieces in hand: –

9	8	7	6	5	4	3	2	1
香	桂	銀	金	王	金	銀	桂	香	1
	飛						角		2
歩		歩	歩	歩	歩		歩	歩	3
	歩					歩			4
									5
									6
歩	歩	歩	歩	歩	歩	歩	歩	歩	7
	角			飛		金			8
香	桂	銀	金		玉	銀	桂	香	9

☗ pieces in hand: –
Gold Mino castle
☖ pieces in hand: –

9	8	7	6	5	4	3	2	1
									1
									2
									3
									4
									5
									6
				歩	歩	歩	歩	歩	7
					銀	金	玉		8
							桂	香	9

☗ pieces in hand: –

2. ...P-84. White starts to activate their rook as well by pushing their rook pawn – thus selecting a Static Rook position.

3. K-49. Black starts moving their king away from left side of the board.

The aim here is to quickly position the king into a Gold Mino castle.

Lady Killer Wham-Bam Rook
☖ pieces in hand: –

9	8	7	6	5	4	3	2	1
香	桂	銀	金	王	金	銀	桂	香	1
	飛						角		2
歩		歩	歩	歩	歩		歩	歩	3
						歩			4
	歩								5
		歩							6
歩	歩		歩	歩	歩	歩	歩	歩	7
	角			飛		金			8
香	桂	銀	金		玉	銀	桂	香	9

☗ pieces in hand: –
Lady Killer Wham-Bam Rook
☖ pieces in hand: –

9	8	7	6	5	4	3	2	1
香	桂		金	王	金	銀	桂	香	1
	飛		銀				角		2
歩		歩	歩	歩	歩		歩	歩	3
						歩			4
	歩								5
		歩							6
歩	歩		歩	歩	歩	歩	歩	歩	7
	角			飛	銀	金			8
香	桂	銀	金		玉		桂	香	9

☗ pieces in hand: –

3. ...P-85. White advances their rook pawn aiming for a pawn exchange.

4. P-76. In response to White's pawn push, Black opens their bishop diagonal to allow their bishop an escape route.

4. ...S-62, 5. S-48. White moves their right silver up toward the center – a typical response to a Ranging Rook opponent. Black does likewise.

Lady Killer Wham-Bam Rook
☖ pieces in hand: –

9	8	7	6	5	4	3	2	1
香	桂		金		金	銀	桂	香	1
	飛		銀		王		角		2
歩		歩	歩	歩	歩		歩	歩	3
						歩			4
	歩								5
		歩							6
歩	歩		歩	歩	歩	歩	歩	歩	7
	角			飛	銀	金			8
香	桂	銀	金			玉	桂	香	9

☗ pieces in hand: –
Lady Killer Wham-Bam Rook
☖ pieces in hand: –

9	8	7	6	5	4	3	2	1
香	桂		金		金	銀	桂	香	1
	飛		銀			王	角		2
歩		歩	歩	歩	歩		歩	歩	3
						歩			4
	歩								5
		歩							6
歩	歩		歩	歩	歩	歩	歩	歩	7
	角			飛	銀	金	玉		8
香	桂	銀	金				桂	香	9

☗ pieces in hand: –

5. ...K-42, 6. K-39 K-32. Both players shift their kings to the right side of the board for castle development.

White is developing a Boat castle, which is typical for a Static Rook player positioned against a Ranging Rook opponent.

7. K-28. By move 13, Black has finished moving their king into the Gold Mino.

Here is the basic position of Lady Killer Wham-Bam Rook before the rook is moved to the eighth file.

=== Variant orderings ===
The above position can be reached via other transpositions.

== Attack sequences ==
Lady Killer Wham-Bam Rook
☖ pieces in hand: –

9	8	7	6	5	4	3	2	1
香	桂		金		金	銀	桂	香	1
	飛		銀			王	角		2
歩		歩	歩	歩	歩		歩	歩	3
						歩			4
									5
	歩	歩							6
歩	歩		歩	歩	歩	歩	歩	歩	7
	角			飛	銀	金	玉		8
香	桂	銀	金				桂	香	9

☗ pieces in hand: –
Lady Killer Wham-Bam Rook
☖ pieces in hand: 歩

9	8	7	6	5	4	3	2	1
香	桂		金		金	銀	桂	香	1
			銀			王	角		2
歩		歩	歩	歩	歩		歩	歩	3
						歩			4
									5
	飛	歩							6
歩			歩	歩	歩	歩	歩	歩	7
	角			飛	銀	金	玉		8
香	桂	銀	金				桂	香	9

☗ pieces in hand: 歩

7. ...P-86. White initiates the pawn exchange on the eighth file.

8. Px86 Rx86. Pawn exchange.

Lady Killer Wham-Bam Rook
☖ pieces in hand: 歩

9	8	7	6	5	4	3	2	1
香	桂		金		金	銀	桂	香	1
			銀			王	馬		2
歩		歩	歩	歩	歩		歩	歩	3
						歩			4
									5
	飛	歩							6
歩			歩	歩	歩	歩	歩	歩	7
				飛	銀	金	玉		8
香	桂	銀	金				桂	香	9

☗ pieces in hand: 角 歩
Lady Killer Wham-Bam Rook
☖ pieces in hand: 角 歩

9	8	7	6	5	4	3	2	1
香	桂		金		金		桂	香	1
			銀			王	銀		2
歩		歩	歩	歩	歩		歩	歩	3
						歩			4
									5
	飛	歩							6
歩			歩	歩	歩	歩	歩	歩	7
				飛	銀	金	玉		8
香	桂	銀	金				桂	香	9

☗ pieces in hand: 角 歩

9. Bx22 Sx22. An early bishop exchange initiated by Black.

With the bishops off the board, Black can now play Opposing Rook.

Lady Killer Wham-Bam Rook
☖ pieces in hand: 角 歩

9	8	7	6	5	4	3	2	1
香	桂		金		金		桂	香	1
			銀			王	銀		2
歩		歩	歩	歩	歩		歩	歩	3
						歩			4
									5
	飛	歩							6
歩			歩	歩	歩	歩	歩	歩	7
	飛				銀	金	玉		8
香	桂	銀	金				桂	香	9

☗ pieces in hand: 角 歩
Lady Killer Wham-Bam Rook
☖ pieces in hand: 角

9	8	7	6	5	4	3	2	1
香	桂		金		金		桂	香	1
			銀			王	銀		2
歩		歩	歩	歩	歩		歩	歩	3
						歩			4
									5
	飛	歩							6
歩	歩		歩	歩	歩	歩	歩	歩	7
	飛				銀	金	玉		8
香	桂	銀	金				桂	香	9

☗ pieces in hand: 角 歩

10. R-88. Black swings their rook over to the eighth file for an Opposing Rook position.

Since White's rook is unprotected on the 86 square, White must respond to Black's threat.

10. ...P*87. White continues their attack by dropping a dangling pawn above Black's rook threatening to capture it.

Lady Killer Wham-Bam Rook
☖ pieces in hand: 角

9	8	7	6	5	4	3	2	1
香	桂		金		金		桂	香	1
			銀			王	銀		2
歩		歩	歩	歩	歩		歩	歩	3
						歩			4
									5
	飛	歩							6
歩	歩		歩	歩	歩	歩	歩	歩	7
飛					銀	金	玉		8
香	桂	銀	金				桂	香	9

☗ pieces in hand: 角 歩
Lady Killer Wham-Bam Rook
☖ pieces in hand: –

9	8	7	6	5	4	3	2	1
香	桂		金		金		桂	香	1
			銀			王	銀		2
歩		歩	歩	歩	歩		歩	歩	3
						歩			4
									5
	飛	歩							6
歩	歩		歩	歩	歩	歩	歩	歩	7
飛	角				銀	金	玉		8
香	桂	銀	金				桂	香	9

☗ pieces in hand: 角 歩

== See also ==
- Ranging Rook
- Shogi opening

== Bibliography ==
- 湯川, 博士 [Hiroshi Yukawa] [in Japanese] (1989). 奇襲大全. マイナビ出版. ISBN 978-4-83995-787-2.
