= Cheerful Central Rook =

Shogi strategy

Cheerful Central Rook (White)
☗ pieces in hand: –

1	2	3	4	5	6	7	8	9
香	桂	銀	金	玉	金	銀	桂	香	9
				飛			角		8
歩	歩	歩	歩		歩		歩	歩	7
				歩		歩			6
							歩		5
		歩							4
歩	歩		歩	歩	歩	歩		歩	3
	角						飛		2
香	桂	銀	金	王	金	銀	桂	香	1

☖ pieces in hand: –

In shogi, Cheerful Central Rook (ゴキゲン中飛車 gokigen nakabisha, also Gokigen Central Rook or Go-As-You-Please Central Rook) is a type of Central Rook opening in which the Central Rook player's bishop diagonal remains open.

This is a more aggressive strategy since the bishops may be exchanged at any time during the opening. (See: Ranging Rook#Types of Ranging Rook.)

Cheerful Central Rook is played against a Static Rook opponent.

== White's variation ==
Cheerful Central Rook
☖ pieces in hand: –

9	8	7	6	5	4	3	2	1
香	桂	銀	金	王	金	銀	桂	香	1
	飛						角		2
歩	歩	歩	歩	歩	歩		歩	歩	3
						歩			4
									5
		歩					歩		6
歩	歩		歩	歩	歩	歩		歩	7
	角						飛		8
香	桂	銀	金	玉	金	銀	桂	香	9

☗ pieces in hand: –
Cheerful Central Rook
☖ pieces in hand: –

9	8	7	6	5	4	3	2	1
香	桂	銀	金	王	金	銀	桂	香	1
	飛						角		2
歩	歩	歩	歩		歩		歩	歩	3
				歩		歩			4
									5
		歩					歩		6
歩	歩		歩	歩	歩	歩		歩	7
	角						飛		8
香	桂	銀	金	玉	金	銀	桂	香	9

☗ pieces in hand: –

1.P-76 P-34 2.P-26. Open bishop diagonals. Black plays Static Rook.

2...P-54. White pushes the central pawn – the signature move of Cheerful Central Rook.

Cheerful Central Rook
☖ pieces in hand: –

9	8	7	6	5	4	3	2	1
香	桂	銀	金	王	金	銀	桂	香	1
	飛						角		2
歩	歩	歩	歩		歩		歩	歩	3
				歩		歩			4
							歩		5
		歩							6
歩	歩		歩	歩	歩	歩		歩	7
	角						飛		8
香	桂	銀	金	玉	金	銀	桂	香	9

☗ pieces in hand: –
Cheerful Central Rook
☖ pieces in hand: –

9	8	7	6	5	4	3	2	1
香	桂	銀	金	王	金	銀	桂	香	1
				飛			角		2
歩	歩	歩	歩		歩		歩	歩	3
				歩		歩			4
							歩		5
		歩							6
歩	歩		歩	歩	歩	歩		歩	7
	角						飛		8
香	桂	銀	金	玉	金	銀	桂	香	9

☗ pieces in hand: –

3.P-25. Rook pawn advance.

3...R-52. Central Rook move.

=== Early pawn push ===
Early rook pawn
☖ pieces in hand: –

9	8	7	6	5	4	3	2	1
香	桂	銀	金	王	金	銀	桂	香	1
							角		2
歩	歩	歩	歩		歩		歩	歩	3
				歩		歩	歩		4
									5
		歩							6
歩	歩		歩	歩	歩	歩		歩	7
	角						飛		8
香	桂	銀	金	玉	金	銀	桂	香	9

☗ pieces in hand: –

After White swings their rook to the central file, pushing the second file pawn by Black (4.P-24) in order to trade the pawns off and get a pawn in hand is thought to be a mistake (although not quite a blunder) here since it will result in a position judged to be better for White. (Note the similarity of these lines with the old Central Rook vs Side Pawn joseki.)

Early rook pawn
☖ pieces in hand: 歩

9	8	7	6	5	4	3	2	1
香	桂	銀	金	王	金	銀	桂	香	1
							角		2
歩	歩	歩	歩		歩			歩	3
				歩		歩	飛		4
									5
		歩							6
歩	歩		歩	歩	歩	歩		歩	7
	角								8
香	桂	銀	金	玉	金	銀	桂	香	9

☗ pieces in hand: 歩
Early rook pawn
☖ pieces in hand: 角 歩

9	8	7	6	5	4	3	2	1
香	桂	銀	金	王	金	銀	桂	香	1
									2
歩	歩	歩	歩		歩			歩	3
				歩		歩	飛		4
									5
		歩							6
歩	歩		歩	歩	歩	歩		歩	7
	馬								8
香	桂	銀	金	玉	金	銀	桂	香	9

☗ pieces in hand: 歩

Early rook pawn
☖ pieces in hand: 角 歩

9	8	7	6	5	4	3	2	1
香	桂	銀	金	王	金	銀	桂	香	1
									2
歩	歩	歩	歩		歩			歩	3
				歩		歩	飛		4
									5
		歩							6
歩	歩		歩	歩	歩	歩		歩	7
	銀								8
香	桂		金	玉	金	銀	桂	香	9

☗ pieces in hand: 角 歩
Cheerful Central Rook (White)
☖ pieces in hand: 歩

9	8	7	6	5	4	3	2	1
香	桂	銀	金	王	金	銀	桂	香	1
				飛					2
歩	歩	歩	歩		歩	角		歩	3
				歩		歩	飛		4
									5
		歩							6
歩	歩		歩	歩	歩	歩		歩	7
	銀								8
香	桂		金	玉	金	銀	桂	香	9

☗ pieces in hand: 角 歩

After the pawn push and pawn trade off (4...Px24 5.Rx24), since the bishop diagonals are both open, White will trade off the bishops (5...Bx88+ 6.Sx88) and drop their bishop forking Black's rook and left silver (6...B*33).

Early rook pawn
☖ pieces in hand: 角 歩

9	8	7	6	5	4	3	2	1
香	桂	銀	金	王	金	銀	龍	香	1
									2
歩	歩	歩	歩		歩	角		歩	3
				歩		歩			4
									5
		歩							6
歩	歩		歩	歩	歩	歩		歩	7
	銀								8
香	桂		金	玉	金	銀	桂	香	9

☗ pieces in hand: 角 桂 歩
Early rook pawn
☖ pieces in hand: 角 銀 歩

9	8	7	6	5	4	3	2	1
香	桂	銀	金	王	金	銀	龍	香	1
									2
歩	歩	歩	歩		歩			歩	3
				歩		歩			4
									5
		歩							6
歩	歩		歩	歩	歩	歩		歩	7
	馬								8
香	桂		金	玉	金	銀	桂	香	9

☗ pieces in hand: 角 桂 歩

If Black plays 7.Rx21+ aggressively capturing White's knight, White replies with 7...Bx88+ capturing Black's silver and aiming to bring the promoted bishop back to the 22 square in order to capture Black's promoted rook.

This continuation is believed to be better for White.

In case Black retreats the rook with 7.R-28 after 6...B*33, White can play the move 7...P*26 aiming for P-27+ to push Black's rook off the second file.

Cheerful Central Rook (White)
☖ pieces in hand:

9	8	7	6	5	4	3	2	1
香	桂	銀	金	王	金	銀	桂	香	1
				飛					2
歩	歩	歩	歩		歩	角		歩	3
				歩		歩			4
									5
		歩					歩		6
歩	歩		歩	歩	歩	歩		歩	7
	銀						飛		8
香	桂		金	玉	金	銀	桂	香	9

☗ pieces in hand: 角 歩

== Castling ==
Cheerful Central Rook (White) - Incomplete Mino Castle
☖ pieces in hand:

9	8	7	6	5	4	3	2	1
香	桂		金		金	銀	桂	香	1
	王	銀		飛					2
	歩	歩	歩		歩	角		歩	3
歩				歩		歩			4
									5
									6
									7
									8
									9

☗ pieces in hand:

White usually aims for an Incomplete Mino castle:

However, there is always the option of a Bear-in-the-hole castle as well.

== Countermeasures ==
=== Maruyama Vaccine ===
Maruyama Vaccine
☖ pieces in hand: 角

9	8	7	6	5	4	3	2	1
香	桂	銀	金	王	金		桂	香	1
				飛			銀		2
歩	歩	歩	歩		歩		歩	歩	3
				歩		歩			4
							歩		5
		歩							6
歩	歩		歩	歩	歩	歩		歩	7
							飛		8
香	桂	銀	金	玉	金	銀	桂	香	9

☗ pieces in hand: 角

One of the most popular countermeasures against Cheerful Central Rook is the so-called Maruyama's Vaccine (丸山ワクチン, maruyama wakuchin). Tadahisa Maruyama started playing it by 2002, and it received that name thanks to the actual Maruyama vaccine (also known as Specific substance of Maruyama), a Mycobacterium tuberculosis-derived vaccine developed in Japan in the 1970s against some types of cancer.

In the opening, before White can move P-55, Black will go for a bishop exchange with 4.Bx22 Sx22 (see Diagram), with the aim of gaining a bishop in hand and turning the game into a slow game. In reaction to this move, the strategy developed so that the Ranging Rook side would switch from a Mino castle to an Opposing Rook.

==== The New Maruyama Vaccine ====
The New Maruyama Vaccine
☖ pieces in hand: 角

9	8	7	6	5	4	3	2	1
香	桂	銀	金	王	金		桂	香	1
				飛			銀		2
歩	歩	歩	歩		歩		歩	歩	3
				歩		歩			4
							歩		5
		歩							6
歩	歩		歩	歩	歩	歩		歩	7
		銀					飛		8
香	桂		金	玉	金	銀	桂	香	9

☗ pieces in hand: 角

Once the position in the Maruyama vaccine's diagram was arrived at, Black's king would castle at 5.K-68. However, White would reply then by dropping the bishop with ...B*33, from which Black would go with 6.N-77, and White would push a pawn to ...P-74 aiming at the head of the knight, and dropping a bishop at 7.B*88 would be pointless following ...P-55. To avoid this situation, then, from the previous diagram the king will not move to 5.K-68, but instead the silver would move to 5.S-78 (see Diagram), a move that is called the New Maruyama Vaccine. By moving the silver there, Black will be fully prepared for White's bishop drop at 33.

==== 5.P-96 ====
Satō's New 5.P-96 move
☖ pieces in hand: 角

9	8	7	6	5	4	3	2	1
香	桂	銀	金	王	金		桂	香	1
				飛			銀		2
歩	歩	歩	歩		歩		歩	歩	3
				歩		歩			4
							歩		5
歩		歩							6
	歩		歩	歩	歩	歩		歩	7
							飛		8
香	桂	銀	金	玉	金	銀	桂	香	9

☗ pieces in hand: 角

From the New Maruyama Vaccine diagram, the game will go next with 5...K-62 6.S-48 P-55, and a bishop drop at 7.B*65, and from there 7...G-32 8.Bx83+ P-56 9.+Bx56 Rx56 10.Px56, and White will have the advantage following 10...B*88. Yasumitsu Satō developed a new move to prevent this situation, where instead of 5.S-78, the pawn is pushed with 5.P-96 (see Diagram).

Following 5.P-96, if White goes with 5...P-94 Black will switch over to the New Maruyama Vaccine with 6.S-78. If then White goes ahead and pushes the central pawn with 6...P-55, then 7.B*65 G-32 8.Bx83+ P-56 9.Px56 B*88, and with 10.L-97 Black is in a good position. This move became popular after Satō defeated Yoshiharu Habu in an official game using this strategy in July 2005.

=== Super Quick Attack G49-58 ===
Super Quick Attack
☖ pieces in hand: 銀 歩

9	8	7	6	5	4	3	2	1
香	桂	銀	金		金	銀		龍	1
			王	飛					2
歩	歩	歩	歩		歩			歩	3
						歩			4
				桂					5
		歩		歩					6
歩	歩		歩		歩	歩		歩	7
	馬			金					8
香	桂		金	玉		銀	桂	香	9

☗ pieces in hand: 角 香 歩(2)
Tonari's New Move
☖ pieces in hand: 銀 香 歩

9	8	7	6	5	4	3	2	1
香	桂	銀	金		金	銀		龍	1
			王	飛					2
歩	歩	歩	歩		歩	香		歩	3
						歩			4
				桂					5
		歩		歩					6
歩	歩		歩		歩	歩		歩	7
				金					8
馬	桂		金	玉		銀	桂	香	9

☗ pieces in hand: 角 歩(2)

Rather than a countermeasure, the Super Quick Attack G49-58 (☗5八金右超急戦, go-hachi kin migi chou kyuusen) strategy can be called a strategy of mutual attack. From the basic position (i.e., 1.P-76 P-34 2.P-26 P-54 3.P-25 R-52), Black pushes the right gold with 4.G49-58, and White decides to go for an attacking race. This strategy was devised hurriedly by Takeshi Fujii in the middle of the 12th Ryuo title matches against Daisuke Suzuki, for which the latter had declared he would be using Ranging Rook as a general strategy. The strategy started being played in that very same tournament.

Following 4.G49-58, the game will continue with 4...P-55 5.P-24 Px24 6.Rx24. White can then respond with either 6...P-56 or 6...G-32, and it will turn into a super quick attack if the choice is 6...P-56 (Suzuki decided to go for a slow development by playing 6...G-32). From 6...P-56, the joseki continues 6...P-56 7.Px56 Bx88+ 8.Sx88 B*33 9.Rx21+ Bx88+ 10.N*55 K-62. While White has the advantage in terms of pieces, the knight drop at 10.N*55 is a powerful move. If White decides to defend from the fork by dropping 10...S*54, then Black will check with the powerful 11.B*33, and no matter how White defends, Black will get a promoted bishop by checking with the knight and capturing the horse on 88, winning the position. Hence, White must move 10...K-62 instead, at which point 11.+Rx11 will follow (see accompanying diagram).

In the past, from the diagram, it was frequent to play 11...+Bx99. Against the lance capture at +Bx99 it was concluded by way of research that White will be at an advantage even after the powerful 12.L*66 and 13.B*33, but then Ryūma Tonari (3-dan at the time) discovered the 12.L*33 move (see diagram).

Whatever the case, in a super quick attack strategy the game will frequently reach its end in few moves, and as research shows, it will easily turn into a win-or-lose game. Moreover, against 4.G49-58 White can opt instead for castling the king, starting with 4...K-62, and there are other ways of preventing a decisive showdown. For this reason, with the exception of Toshiaki Kubo and Kōji Tanigawa, it is rare to see this strategy played in title matches.

=== Super High Speed Silver-37 ===
Super High Speed Silver-37
☖ pieces in hand:

9	8	7	6	5	4	3	2	1
香	桂	銀	金		金	銀	桂	香	1
		王		飛					2
歩	歩	歩	歩		歩	角	歩	歩	3
						歩			4
				歩			歩		5
		歩			銀	歩			6
歩	歩		歩	歩	歩			歩	7
	角		玉				飛		8
香	桂	銀	金		金		桂	香	9

☗ pieces in hand:

In 2010, a strategy called Super High Speed Silver-37 (超速☗3七銀, chōsoku san-nana gin) started gaining popularity among professionals as a countermeasure for Black against White's Cheerful Central Rook. The strategy was named by Kiyokazu Katsumata, and appeared first in a match for the Asahi Cup Shogi Open in December, 2009. It was further developed by Yoshitaka Hoshino, who was awarded the Kōzō Masuda Award for it in 2010.

The basic position occurs as follows: From the basic diagram at the start of this article, the game proceeds with 4.S-48 P-55 5.K-68 B-33 6.P-36 K-62 7.S-37 K-72, followed by 8.S-46 with the aim of launching a quick attack (see Figure).

From there, White can play 8...S-32, 8...S-42, or 8...G-32. Also, if White pushes the fourth file pawn with ...P-44, Black's moving skillfully the right silver as in the Sugai variation is also effective.

Because Black was successful in this variation, White has developed a countermeasure by delaying castling and facing Black's silver with their own left-hand silver: 6...S-42 (instead of 6...K-62) 7.S-37 S-53 8.S-46 S-44.

==== Super High Speed Sword Drawing ====
Taking advantage of the pushed pawn
☖ pieces in hand:

9	8	7	6	5	4	3	2	1
香	桂		金		金	銀	桂	香	1
	飛				王		角		2
歩			歩	歩	歩	歩	歩	歩	3
		歩	銀						4
	歩			歩					5
		歩	銀						6
歩	歩	角	歩		歩	歩	歩	歩	7
				飛					8
香	桂		金	玉	金	銀	桂	香	9

☗ pieces in hand:
Delaying the pawn push
☖ pieces in hand:

9	8	7	6	5	4	3	2	1
香	桂		金		金	銀	桂	香	1
	飛				王		角		2
歩			歩	歩	歩	歩	歩	歩	3
		歩	銀						4
	歩								5
		歩	歩	歩					6
歩	歩	角		銀	歩	歩	歩	歩	7
				飛	玉				8
香	桂		金		金	銀	桂	香	9

☗ pieces in hand:

A countermeasure against Black's Central Rook appeared around 2016. Following 1.P-56, instead of 1...P-34, White would push the rook pawn with 1...P-84, and from there the game would develop with 2.P-76 P-54 3.R-58 S-62 4.K-48 K-42 5.K-38 K-32 6.K-28 S-42 without opening the bishop's diagonal. From there, a novel measure to open the bishop's diagonal was researched (Yasuaki Murayama gave it the name of Super High Speed Sword Drawing (居合抜き超速, iainuki chōsoku).

By delaying ...P-34, a super high speed strategy like Black's becomes effective, too, and as soon as the opponent's left silver veers away White will open the bishop's diagonal, with the aim of capturing the lance, which is difficult to defend. This aim is the one that gives the name to the strategy, insofar as iainuki refers to the technique in iaido in which the sword is drawn, cutting the opponent in the same movement, and then sheathed again.

The research was further developed later, such that even if the opponent playing Central Rook would push along the fifth file, you would be unbothered. Taking advantage of the opponent's pushed pawn, variations were developed that aimed at there (for example, 1.P-56 P-84 2.P-76 S-62 3.R-58 K-42 4.P-55 P-85 5.B-77 P-74 6.S-68 S-73 7.S-57 S-64 (see Diagram). From around 2018, measures were developed also for the central rook player against White not opening the bishop's diagonal by delaying in turn the pushing of the pawn, and since the ranging rook prevents a quick attack the game develops into a slow one (3...K-42 4.S-68 P-85 9.B-77 P-74 10.K-48 S-73 11.S-57 S-64, aiming at a sword drawing position, and then pushing the pawn at 12.P-66 was discovered, allowing the silver to protect the advanced pawn (see Diagram). From there, 12...P-75 will be followed by 13.P-65 threatening a silver capture, and with which the Central Rook's development proves successful).

=== Double Ranging (Third File) Rook ===
double ranging rook variant
☖ pieces in hand:

9	8	7	6	5	4	3	2	1
香	桂	銀	金	王	金	銀	桂	香	1
							飛		2
歩	歩	歩	歩	歩	歩	角		歩	3
						歩			4
				歩			歩		5
						歩			6
歩	歩	歩	歩		歩	銀	歩	歩	7
	角			飛					8
香	桂	銀	金	玉	金		桂	香	9

☗ pieces in hand:

Another common strategy against Cheerful Central Rook is moving the rook in a Third File Rook, turning the game into a double ranging rook, which makes it easy to castle in the right to face the Central Rook. However, Kenji Imaizumi (still an amateur at the time), devised the "Central Rook Left Anaguma", which became a countermeasure for the side playing Central Rook, and which made it difficult for double ranging rooking. Consequently, Third File Rook is not used much anymore as a countermeasure against Cheerful Central Rook. However, since Opposing Rook (see Diagram) is a natural enemy for Left Anaguma, in that case it is better to go with a Left Mino castle (for example, 1. P-56, P-34; 2. R-58, B-33; 3. P-55, R-22; 4. P-36, P-24; 5. S-48, P-25, and then 6. S-37).

=== S-47 Variant ===
The aim can be to exchange the rook pawn. Since this often involves using the knight, this tactic can easily fail if the knight is stopped. However, since the silver isn't advancing, S-47 can also work in defending one's camp.

== See also ==
- Central Rook
- Central Rook Silver Horns
- Quick Ishida
- Direct Opposing Rook
- Bishop Exchange Fourth File Rook
- Ranging Rook

== Bibliography ==
- Kaneko, Takashi (2013). Storming the Mino castle. Translated by Sams, Richard. Nekomado. ISBN 978-4-905225-05-8.
- Kitao, Madoka (2011). Joseki at a glance. Translated by Kawasaki, Tomohide. Nekomado. ISBN 978-4-9052-2501-0.
- Kitao, Madoka (2013). Sabaki at a glance. Translated by Kawasaki, Tomohide. Nekomado. ISBN 978-4-9052-2510-2.
