= Sakata Opposing Rook =

Shogi opening

Sakata Opposing Rook
☖ pieces in hand: 角

9	8	7	6	5	4	3	2	1
香	桂	銀	金	王		銀	桂	香	1
							飛		2
歩	歩	歩	歩	歩	歩	金	歩	歩	3
						歩			4
							歩		5
		歩							6
歩	歩		歩	歩	歩	歩		歩	7
						銀	飛		8
香	桂	銀	金	玉	金		桂	香	9

☗ pieces in hand: 角

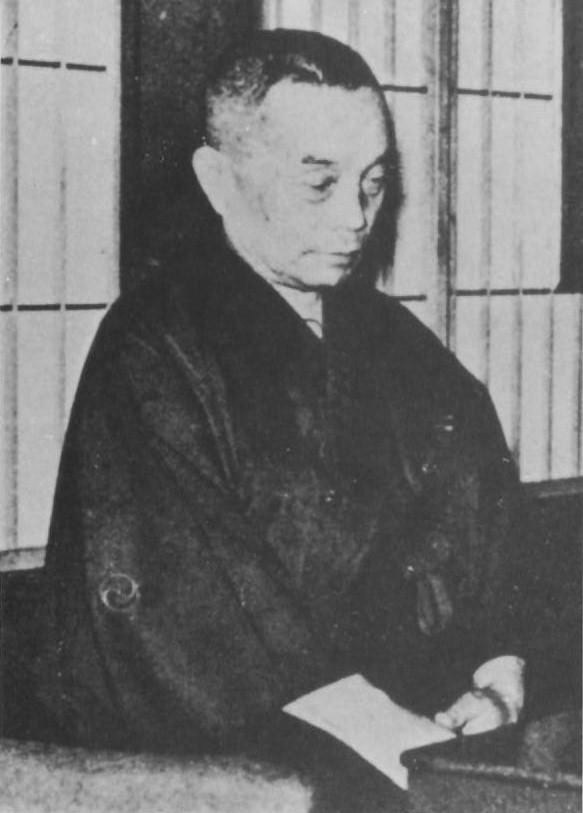
Sakata

In shogi, Sakata Opposing Rook (阪田流向かい飛車 or 坂田流向かい飛車 sakata-ryū mukai hisha) is an Opposing Rook opening.

It refers to the case in a Double Static Rook situation in which Gote (White) switches energetically to an Opposing Rook variation. The origin of this strategy is dated back to the Edo period, but it was after a famous match that shogi Master Sankichi Sakata (1870-1946) played against Ichitarō Doi in May 1919, that it became popular and the opening started being named after him.

== Overview ==
In a Double Static Rook situation following 1. P-76, P-34, 2. P-26, G-32, 3. P-25, Gote (White) opposes with ...B-33, 4. Bx33+, Gx33, and then by moving the rook along the 2nd. rank. There are strategies for both early fight and slow games, but still the emphasis is on constraining ( osaeru) rather than on exchanging pieces (sabaki) which makes it easy to handle in the center.

While counter-attacking by attacking Black's rook pawn is plain and simple, when in combination with Wrong Diagonal Bishop and others, it carries a big destructive power.

== See also ==
- Opposing Rook
- Direct Opposing Rook
- Ranging Rook

== Bibliography ==
- 豊川孝弘 『パワーアップ戦法塾』 NHK出版 2004年
- 豊川孝弘 『阪田流向かい飛車戦法』（『将棋世界2010年8月号』付録） 日本将棋連盟 2010年
- Hosking, Tony (1996). The art of shogi. The Shogi Foundation. ISBN 978-0-95310-890-9.
