= Direct Opposing Rook =

Chess Move

Direct Opposing Rook Basic Formation
☖ pieces in hand: 角

9	8	7	6	5	4	3	2	1
香	桂	銀	金	王	金		桂	香	1
							飛		2
歩	歩	歩	歩	歩	歩	銀	歩	歩	3
						歩			4
									5
		歩					歩		6
歩	歩		歩	歩	歩	歩		歩	7
	銀		玉		銀		飛		8
香	桂		金		金		桂	香	9

☗ pieces in hand: 角

Direct Opposing Rook (ダイレクト向かい飛車 dairekuto mukai hisha) is an Opposing Rook (Ranging Rook) opening in which the player's bishop diagonal remains open allowing for a bishop trade early in the opening.

Although it's classified as an Opposing Rook Ranging Rook strategy, the main characteristic is the readiness to exchange the bishop (i.e., a Ranging Rook with an open Bishop diagonal). In a typical Bishop Exchange Fourth File Rook (when playing White) the rook will move temporarily to the fourth file, and then again to the 2nd. file, with the aim of counterattacking on Black's rook pawn. The reason for the stopover on the 4th file is said to be as a way of preventing the powerful counter-attack that the Static Rook side has by dropping the bishop to 65 (or 45 in the case of White). The Direct Opposing Rook is considered a countermeasure against that B-65 move. However, in the typical Opposing Rook the rook goes from the 8th to the 2nd file (if playing White) with no stopover at the 4th file. The adjective "Direct"comes from the fact that in contrast with Bishop Exchange Fourth File Rook no such stopover is necessary. If Black can take advantage of the resulting gain of one tempo, moving proactively becomes possible.

== See also ==
- Opposing Rook
- Sakata Opposing Rook
- Quick Ishida
- Cheerful Central Rook
- Bishop Exchange Fourth File Rook
- Ranging Rook

== Bibliography ==
- 上野裕和 (2014), NHK将棋講座 2014年9月号 別冊付録 上野裕和のNHK杯の序盤がわかる! (2) 角交換四間飛車 / ダイレクト向かい飛車, NHK出版
- 大石直嗣 (2013), ダイレクト向かい飛車徹底ガイド, マイナビ, ISBN 978-4839947637
- 勝又清和「勝又教授の最新戦法講義 第3回 振り飛車クロニクルの巻」 将棋世界 2008年8月号P82 - P95掲載
- 佐藤康光『佐藤康光の力戦振り飛車』 （日本将棋連盟、2010年）
- 先崎学・北尾まどか『先崎学のすぐわかる現代将棋』（日本放送出版協会、2010年）P176 - P185
