= American Opposing Rook =

American Opposing Rook
☖ pieces in hand: –

9	8	7	6	5	4	3	2	1
									1
	飛								2
									3
									4
	歩	歩							5
			歩						6
歩	歩	角	銀	歩	歩	歩	歩	歩	7
	飛	金							8
香	桂			玉	金	銀	桂	香	9

☗ pieces in hand: –

American Opposing Rook (メリケン向かい飛車 meriken mukai hisha) is an Opposing Rook (Ranging Rook) opening in which after the player's bishop is moved to 77 as Black (or 33 as White) the pawn on the bishop's head (on the 76 square) is advanced to 75.
