= Bishop Head Pawn =

Bishop Head Pawn
☖ pieces in hand: –

9	8	7	6	5	4	3	2	1
香	桂	銀	金	王	金	銀	桂	香	1
	飛						角		2
歩	歩	歩	歩	歩	歩			歩	3
						歩	歩		4
									5
		歩					歩		6
歩	歩		歩	歩	歩	歩		歩	7
	角						飛		8
香	桂	銀	金	玉	金	銀	桂	香	9

☗ pieces in hand: –

In shogi, the Bishop Head Pawn or Bishop's Head Pawn Push (角頭歩 kakutōfu or 角頭歩突き kakutō fuzuki) is a surprise opening.

The opening is characterized by advancing early in the game the bishop's head pawn on 87 to 86 if played by Black or on 23 to 24 if played by White, in which it is undefended. This is a daring move since the head of the bishop (the 87 or 23 square) needs to be defended from a Static Rook attack and moving the bishop's head pawn forward increases the vulnerability of the bishop's head.

It can be developed into a Ranging Rook position and is played against a Static Rook position.

The opening was used by professional Kunio Yonenaga in tournament play in the 1960s and 1970s.

== Development ==
Bishop Head Pawn
☖ pieces in hand: –

9	8	7	6	5	4	3	2	1
香	桂	銀	金	王	金	銀	桂	香	1
	飛						角		2
歩	歩	歩	歩	歩	歩		歩	歩	3
						歩			4
									5
		歩							6
歩	歩		歩	歩	歩	歩	歩	歩	7
	角						飛		8
香	桂	銀	金	玉	金	銀	桂	香	9

☗ pieces in hand: –
Bishop Head Pawn
☖ pieces in hand: –

9	8	7	6	5	4	3	2	1
香	桂	銀	金	王	金	銀	桂	香	1
	飛						角		2
歩	歩	歩	歩	歩	歩		歩	歩	3
						歩			4
									5
	歩	歩							6
歩			歩	歩	歩	歩	歩	歩	7
	角						飛		8
香	桂	銀	金	玉	金	銀	桂	香	9

☗ pieces in hand: –

1. P-76 P-34. After Black opens their bishop diagonal, if White does likewise, then Black can attempt the Bishop Head Pawn opening.

2. P-86. The Bishop Head Pawn position starts by advancing of the pawn at the head of the bishop.

Bishop Head Pawn
☖ pieces in hand: –

9	8	7	6	5	4	3	2	1
香	桂	銀	金	王	金	銀	桂	香	1
	飛						角		2
歩		歩	歩	歩	歩		歩	歩	3
	歩					歩			4
									5
	歩	歩							6
歩			歩	歩	歩	歩	歩	歩	7
	角						飛		8
香	桂	銀	金	玉	金	銀	桂	香	9

☗ pieces in hand: –
Bishop Head Pawn
☖ pieces in hand: –

9	8	7	6	5	4	3	2	1
香	桂	銀	金	王	金	銀	桂	香	1
	飛						馬		2
歩		歩	歩	歩	歩		歩	歩	3
	歩					歩			4
									5
	歩	歩							6
歩			歩	歩	歩	歩	歩	歩	7
							飛		8
香	桂	銀	金	玉	金	銀	桂	香	9

☗ pieces in hand: –

2. ...P-84. White will react to the vulnerable bishop head pawn by starting to develop an attack on the eighth file with a rook pawn.

3. Bx22+ Sx22. Black responds by suddenly exchanging bishops.

Bishop Head Pawn
☖ pieces in hand: –

9	8	7	6	5	4	3	2	1
香	桂	銀	金	王	金		桂	香	1
	飛						銀		2
歩		歩	歩	歩	歩		歩	歩	3
	歩					歩			4
									5
	歩	歩							6
歩		桂	歩	歩	歩	歩	歩	歩	7
							飛		8
香		銀	金	玉	金	銀	桂	香	9

☗ pieces in hand: –

4. N-77. With the bishop in hand and out of the way, Black moves their knight forward to the seventh file order to prevent White's pawn exchange on the eighth file.

== See also ==
- Ranging Rook

== Bibliography ==
- Hosking, Tony (1996). The art of shogi. The Shogi Foundation. ISBN 978-0-95310-890-9.
