= Yoshitaka Hoshino =

Japanese shogi player

- Native name: 星野良生
- Born: August 10, 1988 (age 37)
- Hometown: Ageo, Saitama, Japan

Career
- Achieved professional status: April 1, 2014 (aged 25)
- Badge Number: 295
- Rank: 5-dan
- Teacher: Kazuyoshi Nishimura (9-dan)
- Meijin class: C2
- Ryūō class: 5

Websites
- JSA profile page

Yoshitaka Hoshino (星野 良生, Hoshino Yoshitaka; born August 10, 1988) is a Japanese professional shogi player ranked 5-dan. He also holds an Esports professional shogi player license from the Japan eSports Union (JeSU).

== Early life and apprenticeship ==
Hoshino was born in Ageo, Saitama on August 10, 1988. He became interested in shogi when he was about five years old with his first opponent being his mother, (Note: In an interview with the website Esports World, Hoshino stated he first learned about shogi after seeing a shogi board on the reverse side of a magnetic Othello board game set.) and entered the Japan Shogi Association's apprentice school at the rank of 6-kyū under the guidance of shogi professional Kazuyoshi Nishimura in 2001. He was promoted to the rank of apprentice professional 3-dan in 2007, and finally obtained full professional status and the rank of 4-dan in 2014 after tying Hiroshi Miyamoto for first place in the 54th 3-dan League (October 2013 – March 2014) with a record of 13 wins and 5 losses. Hoshino later stated in an October 2021 interview that his primary motivation for becoming a shogi professional was not money or to have a career, but rather because he felt that "his life would end" and the mental strain would be great if he quit.

== Shogi professional ==
In September 2008, Hoshino became just the second apprentice professional 3-dan to advance to the finals of Shinjin-Ō tournament. His bid to become the first apprentice professional to win the tournament, however, was unsuccessful as he lost the 39th Shinjin-Ō title match 2 games to none to regular professional Amahiko Satō 4-dan.

=== Promotion history ===
The promotion history for Hoshino is as follows:

- 6-kyū: September 2001
- 3-dan: April 2007
- 4-dan: April 1, 2014
- 5-dan: August 13, 2020

=== Awards and honors ===
Hoshino received the Japan Shogi Association's Masuda Award for his "Accelerated Silver 37" variation for the Cheerful Central Rook opening; becoming the second apprentice professional to ever win the award.

=== Esports ===
In January 2020, Hoshino tweeted that he was looking for ways to supplement career as a professional shogi player. He received an offer from the Japanese software company SilverStar Japan and joined the company in April 2020 to take charge of the planning, developing and promoting of its board game products. His duties also made him responsible for the planning, promotion and execution of the company's Esports shogi tournament Real Time Shogi Battle sanctioned by the Japan eSports Union (JeSU) held in 2021. Hoshino also participated in the tournament with the goal of becoming a Esports shogi professional. Hoshino advanced to the final four tournament held at a shopping mall in Nagoya on October 3, 2021, but ended up in fourth place. He was, however, granted an Esports professional shogi player license by the JeSU for his result.
