= Hirokazu Ueno =

Japanese shogi player (born 1977)

- Native name: 上野裕和
- Born: April 13, 1977 (age 49)
- Hometown: Atsugi

Career
- Achieved professional status: October 1, 2000 (aged 23)
- Badge number: 238
- Rank: 6-dan
- Retired: May 16, 2023 (aged 46)
- Teacher: Terutaka Yasue (8-dan)
- Career record: 208–307 (.404)

Websites
- JSA profile page
- Official website

Hirokazu Ueno (上野 裕和, Ueno Hirokazu; April 13, 1977) is a Japanese retired professional shogi player who achieved the rank of 6-dan, and a former executive director of the Japan Shogi Association (JSA).

== Shogi professional ==
The JSA announced on its official website at the beginning of April 2023 that Ueno had met the Free Class criteria for retirement and that his retirement would become official upon completion of his last official game. Ueno's retirement became official on May 16, 2023, after losing to Tomoki Yokoyama in a 36th Ryūō Class 6 game. Ueno finished his career with a record of 208 wins and 307 losses for a winning percentage of 40.4%.

=== Promotion history ===
The promotion history for Ueno wasis as follows:

- 6-kyū: 1991
- 1-dan: 1997
- 4-dan: October 1, 2000
- 5-dan: April 1, 2007
- 6-dan: April 1, 2019
- Retired: May 16, 2023

== JSA director ==
Ueno served as an executive director of the JSA in 2009 and 2010.
