= Feint Ranging Rook =

In shogi, Feint Ranging Rook (陽動振り飛車 yōdōfuribisha) is a Ranging Rook opening in which the player first gives the impression that they are playing a Static Rook position, which subsequently switches to a Ranging Rook position.

This strategy is intended to surprise the opponent and hopefully catch the opponent in a suboptimal position.

The impression of a Static Rook position is created by pushing the player's rook pawn forward (on the second file is played by Black or the eighth file if played by White).

== Castle ==
Top Knot Mino
☖ pieces in hand: –

9	8	7	6	5	4	3	2	1
									1
									2
									3
									4
									5
							歩		6
				歩	歩	歩		歩	7
				金		銀	玉		8
					金		桂	香	9

☗ pieces in hand: –

Instead of the usual Mino castle, Feint Ranging Rook often uses a Top Knot Mino (ちょんまげ美濃 chonmage minō) castle.

== Game examples ==
Fortress vs Feint Opposing Rook
☖ pieces in hand: –

9	8	7	6	5	4	3	2	1
香	桂		金		金		桂	香	1
			王				飛		2
歩			銀	歩	銀	角	歩	歩	3
	歩	歩	歩		歩	歩			4
							歩		5
		歩	歩	歩					6
歩	歩	銀	金		歩	歩		歩	7
		金			銀		飛		8
香	桂	角	玉				桂	香	9

☗ pieces in hand: –
Yoshiharu Habu vs Masataka Gōda 2009 after 25 moves

== See also ==
- Static Rook
- Ranging Rook
- Shogi opening
- Mino castle

== Bibliography ==
- 勝又清和 『消えた戦法の謎』 毎日コミュニケーションズ 1995年
- 『将棋世界2010年12月号』 日本将棋連盟
- 羽生善治 『変わりゆく現代将棋（下）』 日本将棋連盟 2010年
