= Opposing Rook =

Opposing Rook
☖ pieces in hand: –

9	8	7	6	5	4	3	2	1
									1
									2
									3
									4
									5
		歩	歩					歩	6
歩	歩	角	銀	歩	歩	歩	歩		7
	飛	金				銀	玉		8
香	桂				金		桂	香	9

☗ pieces in hand: –

In shogi, Opposing Rook (向かい飛車 mukaibisha, also Opposite Rook, Second File Rook) is a class of Ranging Rook openings in which the player's rook swings over to the second file if played by White or the eighth file if played by Black.

The opposing name is used since if the Opposing Rook player's opponent is playing Static Rook, then the Opposing Rook player's rook will be on the same file as the opponent and the rooks will be facing or opposing each other.

In order to play Opposing Rook, the player's bishop must be moved from its starting position (88 or 22 squares). This is usually done by either moving the bishop to the seventh file for Black or the third file for White or by exchanging bishops. If the opponent initiates the bishop exchange, the Opposing Rook player will capture the opponent's bishop with their rook.

== Traditional Opposing Rook ==
=== White's Opposing Rook ===
Static vs Ranging Rook
☖ pieces in hand: –

9	8	7	6	5	4	3	2	1
香	桂	銀	金	王	金	銀	桂	香	1
	飛						角		2
歩	歩	歩	歩	歩			歩	歩	3
					歩	歩			4
									5
		歩					歩		6
歩	歩		歩	歩	歩	歩		歩	7
	角						飛		8
香	桂	銀	金	玉	金	銀	桂	香	9

☗ pieces in hand: –

The opening starts by the usual four-move sequence that characterizes Static Rook vs Ranging Rook games as shown in the first adjacent board position. (See: Traditional Ranging Rook.)

Static vs Opposing Rook
☖ pieces in hand: –

9	8	7	6	5	4	3	2	1
香	桂	銀	金	王	金	銀	桂	香	1
	飛						角		2
歩	歩	歩	歩	歩			歩	歩	3
					歩	歩			4
							歩		5
		歩							6
歩	歩		歩	歩	歩	歩		歩	7
	角						飛		8
香	桂	銀	金	玉	金	銀	桂	香	9

☗ pieces in hand: –
3. P-25

Static vs Opposing Rook
☖ pieces in hand: –

9	8	7	6	5	4	3	2	1
香	桂	銀	金	王	金	銀	桂	香	1
	飛								2
歩	歩	歩	歩	歩		角	歩	歩	3
					歩	歩			4
							歩		5
		歩							6
歩	歩		歩	歩	歩	歩		歩	7
	角						飛		8
香	桂	銀	金	玉	金	銀	桂	香	9

☗ pieces in hand: –
3...B-33

3. P-25. Black pushes their rook pawn to the middle rank threatening to trade the second file pawns. (Note: For instance, if White moves 3...G-32, then Black can trade the pawns: 4. P-24 Px24, 5. R-24. Pawn Trade ☖ pieces in hand: 歩: 9 / 8 / 7 / 6 / 5 / 4 / 3 / 2 / 1; 香 / 桂 / 銀 / 金 / 王 / / 銀 / 桂 / 香 / 1; / 飛 / / / / / 金 / 角 / / 2; 歩 / 歩 / 歩 / 歩 / 歩 / / / / 歩 / 3; / / / / / 歩 / 歩 / 飛 / / 4; / / / / / / / / / 5; / / 歩 / / / / / / / 6; 歩 / 歩 / / 歩 / 歩 / 歩 / 歩 / / 歩 / 7; / 角 / / / / / / / / 8; 香 / 桂 / 銀 / 金 / 玉 / 金 / 銀 / 桂 / 香 / 9; ☗ pieces in hand: 歩)

Opposing Rook games played by White are usually triggered by this move.

The more common professional move by Black at this point is 3. S-48 as this move is more flexible than 3. P-25. S-48 is said to prevent White's Opposing Rook since moving the bishop to 33 after Black's 3. S-48 will greatly reduce White's set of possible strategies. (Note: That is, this position: 3. S-48 B-33; ☖ pieces in hand: –: 9 / 8 / 7 / 6 / 5 / 4 / 3 / 2 / 1; 香 / 桂 / 銀 / 金 / 王 / 金 / 銀 / 桂 / 香 / 1; / 飛 / / / / / / / / 2; 歩 / 歩 / 歩 / 歩 / 歩 / / 角 / 歩 / 歩 / 3; / / / / / 歩 / 歩 / / / 4; / / / / / / / / / 5; / / 歩 / / / / / 歩 / / 6; 歩 / 歩 / / 歩 / 歩 / 歩 / 歩 / / 歩 / 7; / 角 / / / / 銀 / / 飛 / / 8; 香 / 桂 / 銀 / 金 / 玉 / 金 / / 桂 / 香 / 9; ☗ pieces in hand: –) As examples, White no longer has the option of using a strategy with B-22 and S-31, and White playing a Fortress opening after 3. S-48 B-33 would be awkward. Additionally, B-33 after S-48 reveals very early White's likely Opposing Rook strategy.

3...B-33. White prevents the pawn trade by moving their bishop to the third file defending the 24 square. This move also clears a path for White's rook to swing over to the second file early.

The moves up to this position can, of course, be transposed to the less common sequence below:

	Black (Note: This is the example order given by Hosking (1997: 226–227))	White
1.	P-26	P-34
2.	P-25	B-33
3.	P-76	P-44

Static vs Opposing Rook
☖ pieces in hand: –

9	8	7	6	5	4	3	2	1
香	桂	銀	金	王	金	銀	桂	香	1
	飛								2
歩	歩	歩	歩	歩		角	歩	歩	3
					歩	歩			4
							歩		5
		歩							6
歩	歩		歩	歩	歩	歩		歩	7
	角				銀		飛		8
香	桂	銀	金	玉	金		桂	香	9

☗ pieces in hand: –
4. S-4h

4. S-48. Black moves their right to the fourth file – a standard move against Ranging Rook opponents.

At this point, White has the option of immediately swinging their rook to the second file allowing their king to start castling. Alternately, White can delay the rook and instead start moving their left silver upward to reach the 67 square.

== Ōno ==
Ōno Opposing Rook
☖ pieces in hand: – 角

9	8	7	6	5	4	3	2	1
香	桂	銀	金	王	金	銀	桂	香	1
	飛								2
歩	歩	歩	歩	歩	歩		歩	歩	3
						歩			4
									5
		歩		歩					6
歩	歩		歩		歩	歩	歩	歩	7
	飛								8
香	桂	銀	金	玉	金	銀	桂	香	9

☗ pieces in hand: – 角

Ōno Opposing Rook (大野流向かい飛車, Ōno ryu mukai bisha) is an Opposing Rook variation named after professional player Gen'ichi Ōno (1911-1979). It's played by sente (black) and it's characterized by inciting gote to make a bishop exchange, following which sente will capture gote's bishop with the rook. If gote doesn't go for the bishop exchange sente will go with Center Vanguard Pawn.

== See also ==
- Direct Opposing Rook
- Sakata Opposing Rook
- Bishop Head Pawn
- Ranging Rook
