= Quick Ishida =

Quick Ishida
☖ pieces in hand: –

9	8	7	6	5	4	3	2	1
香	桂	銀	金	王	金	銀	桂	香	1
	飛						角		2
歩		歩	歩	歩	歩		歩	歩	3
						歩			4
	歩	歩							5
									6
歩	歩		歩	歩	歩	歩	歩	歩	7
	角	飛							8
香	桂	銀	金	玉	金	銀	桂	香	9

☗ pieces in hand: –

In shogi, Quick Ishida, Rapid Ishida or Ishida Quick Attack (早石田 haya ishida) is an Ishida variation of the Third File Rook class of openings characterized by an open bishop diagonal.

Like all Ishida variations, it has an early advancement of seventh file pawn when played by Black or third file pawn when played by White.

The strategy initially has the Static Rook opponent aiming to attack the Ishida player's bishop head and while the Ishida player aims to counterattack breaking Static Rook's camp on the seventh file with the threat of several different bishop drop positions.

The Quick Ishida position can lead to a number of traps if the opponent does not defend properly.

== Initial positioning ==
Quick Ishida
up to move 2
☖ pieces in hand: –

9	8	7	6	5	4	3	2	1
香	桂	銀	金	王	金	銀	桂	香	1
	飛						角		2
歩	歩	歩	歩	歩	歩		歩	歩	3
						歩			4
									5
		歩							6
歩	歩		歩	歩	歩	歩	歩	歩	7
	角						飛		8
香	桂	銀	金	玉	金	銀	桂	香	9

☗ pieces in hand: –
1. P-76 P-34
Quick Ishida
up to move 3
☖ pieces in hand: –

9	8	7	6	5	4	3	2	1
香	桂	銀	金	王	金	銀	桂	香	1
	飛						角		2
歩	歩	歩	歩	歩	歩		歩	歩	3
						歩			4
		歩							5
									6
歩	歩		歩	歩	歩	歩	歩	歩	7
	角						飛		8
香	桂	銀	金	玉	金	銀	桂	香	9

☗ pieces in hand: –
2. P-75

1. P-76. The most common and most flexible first move found in shogi games.

A player intending on a Quick Ishida position must open their bishop diagonal with P-76 on their first move since they will need to push this pawn up to the middle rank 5 on their next move.

Furthermore, Quick Ishida positions can only defend against a Static Rook opponent's rook pawn advances with a bishop trade and subsequent attack with bishop drop. Therefore, Quick Ishida is only possible if their Static Rook opponent also opens their bishop diagonal with P-34 allowing for the bishop trade possibility.

1... P-34. The opponent also opens their bishop diagonal. This is most common and flexible move for the White. From here, a bishop trade can occur at any time. At this point, the strategy of White is unknown. White could play a Static Rook opening leading to a Quick Ishida opening although they could just as well play a Ranging Rook opening leading to a Double Ranging Rook game.

2. P-75. On Black's second move, the seventh file pawn is pushed indicating an Ishida position.

If White plays a Static Rook position, this could develop into a Quick Ishida game. However, it is also possible that the game could develop into the slower normal Ishida game.

Quick Ishida
up to move 5
☖ pieces in hand: –

9	8	7	6	5	4	3	2	1
香	桂	銀	金	王	金	銀	桂	香	1
	飛						角		2
歩		歩	歩	歩	歩		歩	歩	3
	歩					歩			4
		歩							5
									6
歩	歩		歩	歩	歩	歩	歩	歩	7
	角	飛							8
香	桂	銀	金	玉	金	銀	桂	香	9

☗ pieces in hand: –
2... P-84
3. R-78
Basic Ishida Structure
☖ pieces in hand: –

9	8	7	6	5	4	3	2	1
									1
									2
									3
									4
		歩							5
									6
歩	歩								7
		飛							8
香									9

☗ pieces in hand: –

2... P-84. White's second move is a major deciding factor in the game. Here, the rook is pushed forward clearly indicating a Static Rook position. Additionally, this move is signaling that White welcomes a Quick Ishida game.

White does have other choices for this move that are still consistent with a Static Rook position, such as K-42 (the most common reply), P-54, P-14, and P-62. However, these moves create unfavorable positions for a Quick Ishida player. Therefore, these other replies usually lead to Black aiming not for a Quick Ishida opening but instead the slower normal Ishida formation, which, depending on the reply, can include closing Black's bishop diagonal with P-66 to prevent an inopportune bishop trade.

Still other replies by White lead to Double Ranging Rook games: P-35 indicates a Double Ishida game, or, less commonly, P-44 prepares for an Opposing Rook position.

The basic position of Quick Ishida is after 6 moves.

Quick Ishida
up to move 6
☖ pieces in hand: –

9	8	7	6	5	4	3	2	1
香	桂	銀	金	王	金	銀	桂	香	1
	飛						角		2
歩		歩	歩	歩	歩		歩	歩	3
						歩			4
	歩	歩							5
									6
歩	歩		歩	歩	歩	歩	歩	歩	7
	角	飛							8
香	桂	銀	金	玉	金	銀	桂	香	9

☗ pieces in hand: –
3... P-85
Quick Ishida
up to move 7
☖ pieces in hand: –

9	8	7	6	5	4	3	2	1
香	桂	銀	金	王	金	銀	桂	香	1
	飛						角		2
歩		歩	歩	歩	歩		歩	歩	3
						歩			4
	歩	歩							5
									6
歩	歩		歩	歩	歩	歩	歩	歩	7
	角	飛			玉				8
香	桂	銀	金		金	銀	桂	香	9

☗ pieces in hand: –
4. K-48

Black usually needs to protect their king from a possible king–rook fork counterattack by White in later moves.

Moving the king is the traditional joseki move.

(But, also see the Suzuki variant.)

== White's silver defense ==
Quick Ishida
up to move 8
☖ pieces in hand: –

9	8	7	6	5	4	3	2	1
香	桂		金	王	金	銀	桂	香	1
	飛		銀				角		2
歩		歩	歩	歩	歩		歩	歩	3
						歩			4
	歩	歩							5
									6
歩	歩		歩	歩	歩	歩	歩	歩	7
	角	飛			玉				8
香	桂	銀	金		金	銀	桂	香	9

☗ pieces in hand: –
4...S-62
Quick Ishida
up to move 9
☖ pieces in hand: –

9	8	7	6	5	4	3	2	1
香	桂		金	王	金	銀	桂	香	1
	飛		銀				角		2
歩		歩	歩	歩	歩		歩	歩	3
		歩				歩			4
	歩								5
									6
歩	歩		歩	歩	歩	歩	歩	歩	7
	角	飛			玉				8
香	桂	銀	金		金	銀	桂	香	9

☗ pieces in hand: –
5. P-74

=== Pawn capture variant ===
Quick Ishida
up to move 10
☖ pieces in hand: 歩

9	8	7	6	5	4	3	2	1
香	桂		金	王	金	銀	桂	香	1
	飛		銀				角		2
歩			歩	歩	歩		歩	歩	3
		歩				歩			4
	歩								5
									6
歩	歩		歩	歩	歩	歩	歩	歩	7
	角	飛			玉				8
香	桂	銀	金		金	銀	桂	香	9

☗ pieces in hand: –
5...Px74
Quick Ishida
up to move 11
☖ pieces in hand: 歩

9	8	7	6	5	4	3	2	1
香	桂		金	王	金	銀	桂	香	1
	飛		銀				馬		2
歩			歩	歩	歩		歩	歩	3
		歩				歩			4
	歩								5
									6
歩	歩		歩	歩	歩	歩	歩	歩	7
		飛			玉				8
香	桂	銀	金		金	銀	桂	香	9

☗ pieces in hand: 角
6. Bx22

Quick Ishida
up to move 13
☖ pieces in hand: 角 歩

9	8	7	6	5	4	3	2	1
香	桂		金	王	金		桂	香	1
	飛		銀				銀		2
歩			歩	歩	歩		歩	歩	3
		歩				歩			4
	歩			角					5
									6
歩	歩		歩	歩	歩	歩	歩	歩	7
		飛			玉				8
香	桂	銀	金		金	銀	桂	香	9

☗ pieces in hand: –
6...Sx22
7. B*55
Quick Ishida
up to move 14
☖ pieces in hand: 角 歩

9	8	7	6	5	4	3	2	1
香	桂		金	王	金		桂	香	1
	飛						銀		2
歩		銀	歩	歩	歩		歩	歩	3
		歩				歩			4
	歩			角					5
									6
歩	歩		歩	歩	歩	歩	歩	歩	7
		飛			玉				8
香	桂	銀	金		金	銀	桂	香	9

☗ pieces in hand: –
7...S-73

Quick Ishida
up to move 15
☖ pieces in hand: 角 歩

9	8	7	6	5	4	3	2	1
香	桂		金	王	金		桂	香	1
	飛						銀		2
歩		銀	歩	歩	歩		歩	歩	3
		飛				歩			4
	歩			角					5
									6
歩	歩		歩	歩	歩	歩	歩	歩	7
					玉				8
香	桂	銀	金		金	銀	桂	香	9

☗ pieces in hand: 歩
8. Rx74

=== Gold fortification variant ===
Quick Ishida
up to move 9
☖ pieces in hand: –

9	8	7	6	5	4	3	2	1
香	桂		金	王	金	銀	桂	香	1
	飛		銀				角		2
歩		歩	歩	歩	歩		歩	歩	3
		歩				歩			4
	歩								5
									6
歩	歩		歩	歩	歩	歩	歩	歩	7
	角	飛			玉				8
香	桂	銀	金		金	銀	桂	香	9

☗ pieces in hand: –
5. P-74
Quick Ishida
up to move 10
☖ pieces in hand: –

9	8	7	6	5	4	3	2	1
香	桂			王	金	銀	桂	香	1
	飛	金	銀				角		2
歩		歩	歩	歩	歩		歩	歩	3
		歩				歩			4
	歩								5
									6
歩	歩		歩	歩	歩	歩	歩	歩	7
	角	飛			玉				8
香	桂	銀	金		金	銀	桂	香	9

☗ pieces in hand: –
5...G-73

=== Preventing Quick Ishida ===
Quick Ishida
up to move 3
☖ pieces in hand: –

9	8	7	6	5	4	3	2	1
香	桂	銀	金	王	金	銀	桂	香	1
	飛						角		2
歩	歩	歩	歩	歩	歩		歩	歩	3
						歩			4
		歩							5
									6
歩	歩		歩	歩	歩	歩	歩	歩	7
	角						飛		8
香	桂	銀	金	玉	金	銀	桂	香	9

☗ pieces in hand: –
1. P-76 P-34
2. P-75

If White defends against Quick Ishida after move 3, then the Quick Ishida opening will often be abandoned in favor of the slower Ishida opening.

==== Prevention by silver ====
Quick Ishida
up to move 4
☖ pieces in hand: –

9	8	7	6	5	4	3	2	1
香	桂		金	王	金	銀	桂	香	1
	飛		銀				角		2
歩	歩	歩	歩	歩	歩		歩	歩	3
						歩			4
		歩							5
									6
歩	歩		歩	歩	歩	歩	歩	歩	7
	角						飛		8
香	桂	銀	金	玉	金	銀	桂	香	9

☗ pieces in hand: –
2...S-62

==== Prevention by king ====
Quick Ishida
up to move 4
☖ pieces in hand: –

9	8	7	6	5	4	3	2	1
香	桂	銀	金		金	銀	桂	香	1
	飛				王		角		2
歩	歩	歩	歩	歩	歩		歩	歩	3
						歩			4
		歩							5
									6
歩	歩		歩	歩	歩	歩	歩	歩	7
	角						飛		8
香	桂	銀	金	玉	金	銀	桂	香	9

☗ pieces in hand: –
2...K-42

==== Prevention by central pawn ====
Quick Ishida
up to move 4
☖ pieces in hand: –

9	8	7	6	5	4	3	2	1
香	桂	銀	金	王	金	銀	桂	香	1
	飛						角		2
歩	歩	歩	歩		歩		歩	歩	3
				歩		歩			4
		歩							5
									6
歩	歩		歩	歩	歩	歩	歩	歩	7
	角						飛		8
香	桂	銀	金	玉	金	銀	桂	香	9

☗ pieces in hand: –
2...P-54

=== Quick Ishida traps ===
Quick Ishida has several traps that must be defended against properly or else the opponent is at risk of swift and aggressive attacks.

==== Eighth file pawn trade ====
Quick Ishida
☖ pieces in hand: –

9	8	7	6	5	4	3	2	1
香	桂	銀	金	王	金	銀	桂	香	1
	飛						角		2
歩		歩	歩	歩	歩		歩	歩	3
						歩			4
	歩	歩							5
									6
歩	歩		歩	歩	歩	歩	歩	歩	7
	角	飛							8
香	桂	銀	金	玉	金	銀	桂	香	9

☗ pieces in hand: –

At first glance, after the initial 6 moves of the Quick Ishida position (namely, 1.P-76 P-34 2.P-75 P-84 3.R-78 P-85), it appears as if Black's bishop head at the 87 square is unprotected allowing White to promote their rook after a pawn trade. However, this would be a blunder.

Pawn Trade Blunder
☖ pieces in hand: –

9	8	7	6	5	4	3	2	1
香	桂	銀	金	王	金	銀	桂	香	1
	飛						角		2
歩		歩	歩	歩	歩		歩	歩	3
						歩			4
		歩							5
	歩								6
歩	歩		歩	歩	歩	歩	歩	歩	7
	角	飛			玉				8
香	桂	銀	金		金	銀	桂	香	9

☗ pieces in hand: –
4... P-86?
Pawn Trade
☖ pieces in hand: 歩

9	8	7	6	5	4	3	2	1
香	桂	銀	金	王	金	銀	桂	香	1
							角		2
歩		歩	歩	歩	歩		歩	歩	3
						歩			4
		歩							5
	飛								6
歩			歩	歩	歩	歩	歩	歩	7
	角	飛			玉				8
香	桂	銀	金		金	銀	桂	香	9

☗ pieces in hand: 歩
5. Px86 Rx86

After White initiates the eighth file pawn trade, they capture Black's pawn positioning their rook on 86. Seeing this blunder, Black will immediately push their seventh file pawn threatening to break through White's camp.

This position often leads to traps such as a king–rook fork or a rook–silver fork (see subsections below) both of which are severe for the Static Rook opponent.

===== King–rook fork =====
7th File Pawn Push
☖ pieces in hand: 歩

9	8	7	6	5	4	3	2	1
香	桂	銀	金	王	金	銀	桂	香	1
							角		2
歩		歩	歩	歩	歩		歩	歩	3
		歩				歩			4
									5
	飛								6
歩			歩	歩	歩	歩	歩	歩	7
	角	飛			玉				8
香	桂	銀	金		金	銀	桂	香	9

☗ pieces in hand: 歩
6. P-7d!
Pawn Capture Blunder
☖ pieces in hand: 歩歩

9	8	7	6	5	4	3	2	1
香	桂	銀	金	王	金	銀	桂	香	1
							角		2
歩			歩	歩	歩		歩	歩	3
		歩				歩			4
									5
	飛								6
歩			歩	歩	歩	歩	歩	歩	7
	角	飛			玉				8
香	桂	銀	金		金	銀	桂	香	9

☗ pieces in hand: 歩
6... Px74?

After White's premature eighth pawn trade, a bigger blunder by White would be reflexively capturing Black's seventh file pawn with 6... Px74?

Black will not capture the 74-pawn with their rook (7. Rx74?) as White may expect.

Bishop Trade
☖ pieces in hand: 歩歩

9	8	7	6	5	4	3	2	1
香	桂	銀	金	王	金	銀	桂	香	1
							馬		2
歩			歩	歩	歩		歩	歩	3
		歩				歩			4
									5
	飛								6
歩			歩	歩	歩	歩	歩	歩	7
		飛			玉				8
香	桂	銀	金		金	銀	桂	香	9

☗ pieces in hand: 角 歩
7. Bx22+

King–Rook Fork
☖ pieces in hand: 角 歩歩

9	8	7	6	5	4	3	2	1
香	桂	銀	金	王	金		桂	香	1
							銀		2
歩			歩	歩	歩		歩	歩	3
		歩				歩			4
角									5
	飛								6
歩			歩	歩	歩	歩	歩	歩	7
		飛			玉				8
香	桂	銀	金		金	銀	桂	香	9

☗ pieces in hand: 歩
7... Sx72
8. B*95!

With White's 73 pawn moved forward to rank 4, White's sitting king is now vulnerable to diagonal attacks.

Thus, after White captures the horse with their left silver, Black drops their bishop to 95 forking White's king and rook.

Rook Loss
☖ pieces in hand: 角 歩歩

9	8	7	6	5	4	3	2	1
香	桂	銀	金		金		桂	香	1
					王		銀		2
歩			歩	歩	歩		歩	歩	3
		歩				歩			4
									5
	角								6
歩			歩	歩	歩	歩	歩	歩	7
		飛			玉				8
香	桂	銀	金		金	銀	桂	香	9

☗ pieces in hand: 飛 歩
8... K-42

9. Bx86

Unfavorable for Static Rook
☖ pieces in hand: 角 歩

9	8	7	6	5	4	3	2	1
香	桂	銀			金		桂	香	1
	歩	金			王				2
歩			歩	歩	歩	銀	歩	歩	3
		歩				歩			4
									5
									6
歩		角	歩	歩	歩	歩	歩	歩	7
	飛				玉				8
香	桂	銀	金		金	銀	桂	香	9

☗ pieces in hand: 飛 歩
9... P*82

10. R-88 G-72

11. B-77 S-33

Since White must resolve the check (for instance, by fleeing leftwards), there is no way for White to save their rook.

White losing their rook this early in the game is likely to be devastating. Furthermore, it will be difficult for White to protect the right side of their camp while simultaneously trying to prevent Black's rook drop within their camp.

===== Rook–silver fork =====
Quick Ishida Trap
☖ pieces in hand: 歩

9	8	7	6	5	4	3	2	1
香	桂	銀	金	王	金	銀	桂	香	1
							角		2
歩		歩	歩	歩	歩		歩	歩	3
		歩				歩			4
									5
	飛								6
歩			歩	歩	歩	歩	歩	歩	7
	角	飛			玉				8
香	桂	銀	金		金	銀	桂	香	9

☗ pieces in hand:
6. P-74!
Quick Ishida Trap
☖ pieces in hand: 歩歩

9	8	7	6	5	4	3	2	1
香	桂		金	王	金	銀	桂	香	1
			銀				角		2
歩		歩	歩	歩	歩		歩	歩	3
		歩				歩			4
									5
	飛								6
歩			歩	歩	歩	歩	歩	歩	7
	角	飛			玉				8
香	桂	銀	金		金	銀	桂	香	9

☗ pieces in hand: –
6...Sx62?

Quick Ishida Trap
☖ pieces in hand: 角 歩歩

9	8	7	6	5	4	3	2	1
香	桂		金	王	金		桂	香	1
			銀				銀		2
歩		歩	歩	歩	歩		歩	歩	3
		歩				歩			4
									5
	飛								6
歩			歩	歩	歩	歩	歩	歩	7
		飛			玉				8
香	桂	銀	金		金	銀	桂	香	9

☗ pieces in hand: 角
7. Bx22+ Sx22
Rook–Silver Fork
☖ pieces in hand: 角 歩歩

9	8	7	6	5	4	3	2	1
香	桂		金	王	金		桂	香	1
			銀				銀		2
歩		歩	歩	歩	歩		歩	歩	3
		歩				歩			4
									5
	飛								6
歩		角	歩	歩	歩	歩	歩	歩	7
		飛			玉				8
香	桂	銀	金		金	銀	桂	香	9

☗ pieces in hand: –
8. B*77!

After move 15, Black drops their bishop to 77 forking White's rook and silver.

This position favors Black.

=== Suzuki variation ===
Quick Ishida
up to move 6
☖ pieces in hand:

9	8	7	6	5	4	3	2	1
香	桂	銀	金	王	金	銀	桂	香	1
	飛						角		2
歩		歩	歩	歩	歩		歩	歩	3
						歩			4
	歩	歩							5
									6
歩	歩		歩	歩	歩	歩	歩	歩	7
	角	飛							8
香	桂	銀	金	玉	金	銀	桂	香	9

☗ pieces in hand: –
1. P-76 P-34

2. P-75 P-84

3. R-78 P-85
Suzuki variation
up to move 7
☖ pieces in hand:

9	8	7	6	5	4	3	2	1
香	桂	銀	金	王	金	銀	桂	香	1
	飛						角		2
歩		歩	歩	歩	歩		歩	歩	3
		歩				歩			4
	歩								5
									6
歩	歩		歩	歩	歩	歩	歩	歩	7
	角	飛							8
香	桂	銀	金	玉	金	銀	桂	香	9

☗ pieces in hand: –
4. P-74

Professional player Daisuke Suzuki (鈴木大介) has suggested a new variation on Quick Ishida after the initial Quick Ishida formation, which is to quickly attack White's seventh file pawn instead of moving the king away from their rook rightwards.

== Masuda's variation ==
The Quick Ishida is also often called Masuda Quick Ishida (升田式早石田 Masuda shiki haya ishida). As a well established surprise attack, it's generally covered extensively in books for amateur players alongside the Climbing silver or bōgin opening. The fact that Kōzō Masuda, four time winner of the Meijin tournament under the then new "Real Strength Meijin system", improved the strategy of what at the time was merely a trap move made a huge impact in the world of shogi.

Masuda's Ishida
☖ pieces in hand: 角

9	8	7	6	5	4	3	2	1
香	桂		金		金		桂	香	1
	飛				王		銀		2
歩		歩	銀	歩	歩		歩	歩	3
			歩			歩			4
	歩	歩							5
		飛							6
歩	歩		歩	歩	歩	歩	歩	歩	7
	銀	金				銀	玉		8
香	桂				金		桂	香	9

☗ pieces in hand: 角

== See also ==
- Third File Rook
- Ranging Rook
- Shogi opening

== Bibliography ==
- Hosking, Tony (1997). The art of shogi. The Shogi Foundation. ISBN 978-0-95310-890-9.
- 勝又, 清和 [in Japanese] (2014). 新手ポカ妙手選: 居飛車編. マイナビ出版. ISBN 978-4-83995-058-3.
- Kitao, Madoka (2011). Joseki at a glance. Translated by Kawasaki, Tomohide. Nekomado. ISBN 978-4-9052-2501-0.
- Kitao, Madoka (2013). Sabaki at a glance. Translated by Kawasaki, Tomohide. Nekomado. ISBN 978-4-9052-2510-2.
- Ōuchi, Nobuyuki (1979). "Masuda's variation of Ishida's opening". Shogi (19). Translated by Fairbairn, John: 16–20.
