= Ranging Rook =

Openings in shogi position the rook to the center or left of the player's board

Fourth File Rook vs Static Rook
☖ pieces in hand: –

9	8	7	6	5	4	3	2	1
香	桂				金	銀	桂	香	1
	飛		銀	金		王	角		2
歩			歩		歩		歩		3
		歩		歩		歩		歩	4
	歩								5
		歩	歩					歩	6
歩	歩	角		歩	歩	歩	歩		7
		銀	飛	金		銀	玉		8
香	桂				金		桂	香	9

☗ pieces in hand: –
Black (sente) is using a classic Ranging Rook position (Fourth File Rook). The rook has moved from the 28 square to 68, the king has moved into a Mino castle, and the bishop's diagonal has been closed by advancing the sixth file pawn to the 66 square. White (gote) is playing a Counter-Ranging Rook Static Rook position. White's rook is on its starting square, the rook's pawn has been pushed forward two squares, and the king has been moved into a Boat castle.

Ranging Rook or Swinging Rook (振り飛車 furibisha) openings in shogi position the rook to the center or left of the player's board to support an attack there.

Ranging Rook strategies used in Ranging Rook vs Static Rook are among the oldest of shogi strategies attested in the historical documents that first describe the rules of shogi around 1600.

== Description ==
Ranging Rook
File 8
☖ pieces in hand: –

9	8	7	6	5	4	3	2	1
									1
									2
									3
									4
									5
		歩							6
歩	歩	角	歩	歩	歩	歩	歩	歩	7
	飛								8
香	桂	銀	金	玉	金	銀	桂	香	9

☗ pieces in hand: –
Ranging Rook
File 7
☖ pieces in hand: –

9	8	7	6	5	4	3	2	1
									1
									2
									3
									4
									5
		歩	歩						6
歩	歩			歩	歩	歩	歩	歩	7
	角	飛							8
香	桂	銀	金	玉	金	銀	桂	香	9

☗ pieces in hand: –
Ranging Rook
File 6
☖ pieces in hand: –

9	8	7	6	5	4	3	2	1
									1
									2
									3
									4
									5
		歩	歩						6
歩	歩			歩	歩	歩	歩	歩	7
	角		飛						8
香	桂	銀	金	玉	金	銀	桂	香	9

☗ pieces in hand: –
Ranging Rook
File 5
☖ pieces in hand: –

9	8	7	6	5	4	3	2	1
									1
									2
									3
									4
									5
		歩	歩	歩					6
歩	歩		銀		歩	歩	歩	歩	7
	角			飛					8
香	桂		金	玉	金	銀	桂	香	9

☗ pieces in hand: –

=== Types of Ranging Rook ===
Ranging Rook
☖ pieces in hand: –

9	8	7	6	5	4	3	2	1
香	桂	銀	金	王	金		桂	香	1
					飛	銀			2
	歩	歩	歩	歩		角	歩	歩	3
歩					歩	歩			4
									5
									6
									7
									8
									9

☗ pieces in hand: –
Black's Ranging Rook
☖ pieces in hand: –

9	8	7	6	5	4	3	2	1
									1
									2
									3
									4
									5
		歩	歩					歩	6
歩	歩	角		歩	歩	歩	歩		7
		銀	飛						8
香	桂		金	玉	金	銀	桂	香	9

☗ pieces in hand: –

Traditionally, Ranging Rook has been used as a defensive strategy for White against Static Rook openings played by Black. White's rook can be moved flexibly to counteract Black's attacks. These types of White openings are named simply Ranging Rook (振り飛車 furibisha). In describing the game positions of both opponents, the term is Static Rook vs Ranging Rook (居飛車対振り飛車 ibisha tai furibisha). In these games, Black has the initiative, and White quickly builds a defense by castling the king and seeks counterattacking opportunities.

By default, the term 振り飛車 usually assumes that the Ranging Rook player is White as it was played traditionally. However, Ranging Rook positions are also possible for Black, when it is specifically referred to as Black's Ranging Rook (先手振り飛車 sente furibisha).

Closing Bishop's Diagonal (Black)
☖ pieces in hand: –

9	8	7	6	5	4	3	2	1
									1
							角		2
									3
									4
									5
		歩	歩						6
歩	歩			歩	歩	歩	歩	歩	7
	角						飛		8
香	桂	銀	金	玉	金	銀	桂	香	9

☗ pieces in hand: –
P-6f
Closing Bishop's Diagonal (White)
☖ pieces in hand: –

9	8	7	6	5	4	3	2	1
香	桂	銀	金	王	金	銀	桂	香	1
							角		2
歩	歩	歩	歩	歩			歩	歩	3
					歩	歩			4
									5
									6
									7
	角								8
									9

☗ pieces in hand: –
P-4d

From its defensive origins, the standard way to play Ranging Rook openings is for the player to close the bishop's diagonal by advancing a pawn to the 66 square when played by Black or advancing to 44 when played by White. Thus, Ranging Rook is sometimes termed Ordinary Ranging Rook or Normal Ranging Rook (ノーマル振り飛車 nōmaru furibisha) or Standard Ranging Rook (スタンダード振り飛車 sutandādo furibisha) to contrast with the newer Ranging Rook strategies that keep the bishop's diagonal open. Since the traditional Ranging Rook prevents early bishop exchanges, it is described as a slow game (持久戦 jikyūsen) in Japanese. Preventing an early bishop exchange allows for the Ranging Rook player to develop the castle and defense without needing to worry about being stymied by bishop drops.

The traditional normal type of Ranging Rook contrasts with Ranging Rook positions that allow a bishop trade off to occur at any time (often early in the opening), which are known as Bishop Exchange Ranging Rook (角交換振り飛車 kaku kōkan furibisha) or Open Bishop Diagonal Ranging Rook (角道オープン振り飛車 kaku michi ōpen furibisha). These openings include Quick Ishida, Cheerful Central Rook, Bishop Exchange Fourth File Rook, Direct Opposing Rook, among others.

==== Normal Ranging Rook ====
First moves
☖ pieces in hand: –

9	8	7	6	5	4	3	2	1
香	桂	銀	金	王	金	銀	桂	香	1
	飛						角		2
歩	歩	歩	歩	歩	歩		歩	歩	3
						歩			4
									5
		歩					歩		6
歩	歩		歩	歩	歩	歩		歩	7
	角						飛		8
香	桂	銀	金	玉	金	銀	桂	香	9

☗ pieces in hand: –
1. P-76 P-34
2. P-26
Diagonal close
☖ pieces in hand: –

9	8	7	6	5	4	3	2	1
香	桂	銀	金	王	金	銀	桂	香	1
	飛						角		2
歩	歩	歩	歩	歩			歩	歩	3
					歩	歩			4
									5
		歩					歩		6
歩	歩		歩	歩	歩	歩		歩	7
	角						飛		8
香	桂	銀	金	玉	金	銀	桂	香	9

☗ pieces in hand: –
2... P-44

1. P-76 P-34, 2. P-26. The Normal openings start by Black opening the bishop's diagonal (P-76) and showing the intention to play Static Rook (P-26). White responds by opening the bishop's diagonal as well. The order 1. P-76 P-34, 2. P-26 is the most common, but of course the moves may be transposed as in 1. P-26 P-34, 2. P-76. (Note: Playing 1. P-26 on the first move merely signals that Black is probably intending to play Static Rook from the beginning of the game instead of the third move. Thus, 1. P-76 is more flexible for Black and less informative to White.)

2... P-44. The traditional, defensive play starts with the fourth move. With this standard move White prevents an early bishop exchange by closing the bishop's diagonal. This allows White to start building the castle and further developing pieces without having to worry about bishop drops that would otherwise be possible if the bishop diagonal was left open and Black initiated a bishop exchange.

These four opening moves characterize most Normal Ranging Rook positions when the rooks are moved to different files.

After this, the most common moves by Black are to move the right silver up to the fourth file (3. S-48) or to continue advancing the rook's pawn (3. P-25). If Black chooses the rook's pawn option, White must respond by moving the bishop to the third file (3... B-33) to prevent Black from getting a pawn in hand through a pawn exchange on the second file.

=== Double Ranging Rook ===
Double Ranging Rook (相振り飛車 aifuribisha) is the class of openings when both players use Ranging Rook strategies. The josekis for these opening are less developed than many of the other types of games such as Double Static Rook (相居飛車 aiibisha) and Static Rook vs Ranging Rook.

=== Classification of positions by file ===
Ranging Rook strategies are classified according to which file the rook moves to. They are generally named from White's perspective since the strategies were originally developed as defensive positions by White. (Note: This opening nomenclature also leads to the name of the Static Rook opening known as Right Fourth File Rook. Since Fourth File Rook refers to a Ranging Rook strategy, the addition of right is intended to distinguish the opening from the Ranging Rook opening by specifying that it is played on the player's right side. Thus, in Right Fourth File Rook played by White, the rook is moved to the sixth file (R-62) while in the same opening played by Black the rook actually moves to the fourth file (R-48). Thus, the generalization is that Ranging Rook openings are named from White's perspective while Static Rook openings are named from Black's perspective.) For instance, the Third File Rook opening is named third file because when White moves the rook into position, it will end up on the third file (R-32). If the same Third File Rook opening were played by Black, then Black's rook would move to the seventh file (R-78).

The Opposing Rook opening moves a rook to the same file as the opponent's rook. For White, this Opposing Rook position is the second file (R-22) while the position played by Black is the eighth file (R-88). The moved rook thus opposes the opponent's rook.

==== Central Rook ====
Central Rook (Black) with Mino Castle
☖ pieces in hand: –

9	8	7	6	5	4	3	2	1
香	桂				金		桂	香	1
			銀	金	銀	王	角		2
歩					歩		歩	歩	3
		歩	歩	歩		歩			4
	歩								5
		歩	歩	歩					6
歩	歩	角	銀		歩	歩	歩	歩	7
		金		飛		銀	玉		8
香	桂				金		桂	香	9

☗ pieces in hand: –
Cheerful Central Rook (White)
☖ pieces in hand: –

9	8	7	6	5	4	3	2	1
香	桂	銀	金	王	金	銀	桂	香	1
				飛			角		2
歩	歩	歩	歩		歩		歩	歩	3
				歩		歩			4
							歩		5
		歩							6
歩	歩		歩	歩	歩	歩		歩	7
	角						飛		8
香	桂	銀	金	玉	金	銀	桂	香	9

☗ pieces in hand: –

Central Rook (中飛車) openings position the rook on the fifth (central) file.

In another variant of Central Rook called Cheerful Central Rook (ゴキゲン中飛車) the bishop's diagonal is kept open.

==== Fourth File Rook ====
Fourth File Rook (Black)
☖ pieces in hand: –

9	8	7	6	5	4	3	2	1
									1
									2
									3
									4
									5
		歩	歩						6
歩	歩			歩	歩	歩	歩	歩	7
	角		飛			玉			8
香	桂	銀	金		金	銀	桂	香	9

☗ pieces in hand: –
Fourth File Rook (White)
☖ pieces in hand: –

9	8	7	6	5	4	3	2	1
香	桂	銀	金		金		桂	香	1
		王			飛	銀	角		2
歩	歩	歩	歩	歩			歩	歩	3
					歩	歩			4
									5
									6
									7
									8
									9

☗ pieces in hand: –

Fourth File Rook (四間飛車) is a Ranging Rook opening in which the rook is moved to fourth file if played by White and the sixth file if played by Black.

Bishop Exchange Fourth File Rook (角交換四間飛車 kaku koukan shikenbisha) is an aggressive variant of Fourth File Rook in which the Ranging Rook player keeps the bishop's diagonal open allowing for bishop trades early in the game.

===== Fujii System =====
The Fujii System (藤井システム fujii shisutemu) is a complex system of piece development, castle formation, and counterattacking to be used with Ranging Rook strategies. It was invented by shogi professional Takeshi Fujii (藤井猛). It is particularly useful against Static Rook's Anaguma strategies, which prior to the development of the Fuiji system had started to seem invincible for Ranging Rook players.

==== Third File Rook ====
Third File Rook (Black)
☖ pieces in hand: –

9	8	7	6	5	4	3	2	1
									1
									2
									3
									4
									5
		歩	歩						6
歩	歩	角		歩	歩	歩	歩	歩	7
		飛	銀		玉				8
香	桂		金		金	銀	桂	香	9

☗ pieces in hand: –
Third File Rook (White)
☖ pieces in hand: –

9	8	7	6	5	4	3	2	1
香	桂	銀	金		金		桂	香	1
		王			銀	飛			2
歩	歩	歩	歩	歩		角	歩	歩	3
					歩	歩			4
									5
									6
									7
									8
									9

☗ pieces in hand: –

Third File Rook (三間飛車 sangenbisha) openings position the rook on third file if played by White and the seventh file if played by Black.

===== Ishida =====
Real Ishida
☖ pieces in hand: –

9	8	7	6	5	4	3	2	1
									1
									2
									3
									4
		歩							5
		飛	歩	銀				歩	6
歩	歩	桂		歩	歩	歩	歩		7
	角			金		銀	玉		8
香					金		桂	香	9

☗ pieces in hand: –
Quick Ishida
☖ pieces in hand: –

9	8	7	6	5	4	3	2	1
香	桂	銀	金	王	金	銀	桂	香	1
	飛						角		2
歩		歩	歩	歩	歩		歩	歩	3
						歩			4
	歩	歩							5
									6
歩	歩		歩	歩	歩	歩	歩	歩	7
	角	飛			玉				8
香	桂	銀	金		金	銀	桂	香	9

☗ pieces in hand: –

The Ishida (石田流 ishida-ryū) openings – including Real Ishida (石田流本組 ishida-ryū hon gumi) and Quick Ishida (早石田 haya ishida) variations – are subcategories of Third File Rook in which the seventh file pawn (if played by Black) or the third file pawn (if played by White) is advanced to the 5th rank early in the opening, allowing the rook to move up to 76 (or 34 for White).

==== Opposing Rook ====
Opposing Rook (Black)
☖ pieces in hand: –

9	8	7	6	5	4	3	2	1
									1
									2
									3
									4
									5
		歩	歩						6
歩	歩	角	銀	歩	歩	歩	歩	歩	7
	飛								8
香	桂		金	玉	金	銀	桂	香	9

☗ pieces in hand: –

Opposing Rook (向かい飛車 mukai hisha) positions the rook on eighth file (Black) where the bishop was originally (or the second file for White).

==== Feint Ranging Rook ====
Feint Ranging Rook (陽動振り飛車 yōdōfuribisha) is a Ranging Rook opening in which the player advances the rook's pawn, sending a false message to the opponent that they intend to play a Static Rook opening. Subsequently, the player positions the pieces in a Ranging Rook position and tries to take advantage of any poor piece development by the opponent.

== See also ==
- Central Rook
- Third File Rook
- Shogi opening

== Bibliography ==
- Kitao, Madoka (2011). Joseki at a glance. Translated by Kawasaki, Tomohide. Nekomado. ISBN 978-4-9052-2501-0.
