= Takeshi Fujii =

Japanese shogi player (born 1970)

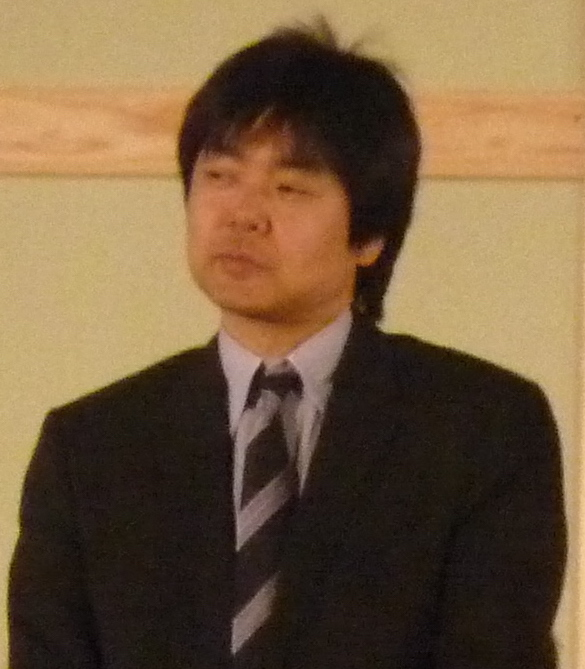
- Fujii in 2014
- Native name: 藤井猛
- Born: September 29, 1970 (age 55)
- Hometown: Numata, Gunma

Career
- Achieved professional status: April 1, 1991 (aged 20)
- Badge number: 198
- Rank: 9-dan
- Teacher: Kazuyoshi Nishimura (9-dan)
- Major titles won: 3
- Tournaments won: 8
- Meijin class: C1
- Ryūō class: 2

Websites
- JSA profile page

Takeshi Fujii (藤井 猛, Fujii Takeshi; born September 29, 1970) is a Japanese professional shogi player ranked 9-dan. He is a former Ryūō title holder, and a former non-executive director of the Japan Shogi Association.

Fujii is known for developing the Fujii System, a class of strategies for Fourth File Rook positions against Static Rook opponents especially Static Rook Anaguma.

== Shogi professional ==
Fujii's first tournament championship as a professional came in 1996 when he defeated Tadahisa Maruyama 2 games to 1 to win the 27th Shinjin-Ō tournament. The following year, Fujii defended his championship by defeating Mamoru Hatakeyama 2 games to none to win the 28th Shinjin-Ō tournament. Fujii won the tournament for a third time in 1999 when he defeated Kazushiza Horiguchi 2 games to none to win the 30th Shinjin-Ō tournament. Fujii is one of three professionals to win the Shinjin-Ō tournament three times. (Note: The other two are Toshiyuki Moriuchi who won the 18th, 22nd and 24th tournaments, and Hidemitsu Moriyasu who won the 4th, 6th and 8th tournaments.)

Fujii's first appearance in a major title match came in 1998 when he challenged Kōji Tanigawa for the 11th Ryūō title. Fujii earned the right to challenge Tanigawa by winning Class 4 in the tournament's preliminary rounds and then advancing to the finals of the challenger's tournament where he defeated Yoshiharu Habu 2 games to 1. In the title match against Tanigawa, Fujii won the first four games to sweep the match 4 game to none and win his first major title. Fujii successfully defended his title the next two years when he defeated Daisuke Suzuki 4 games to 1 (12th Ryūō title match) in 1999 and Habu 4 games to 3 (13th Ryūō title match) in 2000, Fujii's victory of Habu made him the first person to win the Ryuo title three years in a row. Fujii, however, was unable to defend his title a third consecutive time when he lost to Habu 4 games to 1 in the 14th Ryūō title match in 2001.

Fujii also challenged Habu for the 48th and 58th Ōza titles in 2000 and 2010 respectively as well as for the 53rd Ōi title in 2012, but lost each time: 48th Ōza (2002) 3 games to 2; 58th Ōza (2010) 3 games to none; and 53rd Ōi (2012) 4 games to 1.

Fujii became the 49th professional to win his 600th official game when he defeated Tetsurō Itodani on January 27, 2016.

=== Promotion history ===
Fujii's promotion history is as follows:

- 6-kyū: April 1986
- 1-dan: October 1988
- 4-dan: April 1, 1991
- 5-dan: April 1, 1994
- 6-dan: April 1, 1995
- 7-dan: October 1, 1998
- 8-dan: October 1, 1999
- 9-dan: October 1, 2000

=== Titles and other championships ===
Fujii has appeared in major title matches seven times and has won three titles. He won the 11th (1998), 12th (1999) and 13th (2000) Ryūō titles. In addition to major titles, Fujii has won eight non-major-title championships during his career.

==== Major titles ====
Title	Years	Number of times overall
Ryūō	1998–2000	3

==== Other championships ====
Tournament	Years	Number of times
Shinjin-Ō	1996–1997, 1999	3
JT Nihon Series	2002, 2005	2
Ginga Tournament	2016	1
^{*}Quick Play Young Professionals Tournament	1997	1
^{*}Hayazashi Senshuken	1999	1

Note: Tournaments marked with an asterisk (*) are no longer held.

=== Awards and honors ===
Fujii has received a number of awards and honors throughout his career for his accomplishments both on an off the shogi board. These include the Annual Shogi Awards given out by the JSA for performance in official games as well as other JSA awards for career accomplishments, and awards received from governmental organizations, etc. for contributions made to Japanese society.

==== Annual Shogi Awards ====
- 24th Annual Awards (April 1996 – March 1997): Masuda Award
- 26th Annual Awards (April 1998 – March 1999): Most Games Won, Most Games Played, Technique Award
- 27th Annual Awards (April 1999 – March 2000): Distinguished Service Award
- 28th Annual Awards (April 2000 – March 2001): Technique Award
- 38th Annual Awards (April 2010 – March 2011): Game of the Year Special Prize
- 40th Annual Awards (April 2012 – March 2013): Masuda Award

==== Other awards ====
- 1999, January: Numata City Meritorius Citizen Award
- 2016, January: Shogi Honor Award (Awarded by the JSA in recognition of winning 600 official games as a professional)
- 2016: 25 Years Service Award (Awarded by the JSA in recognition of being an active professional for twenty-five years)

=== Year-end shogi prize money and game fee ranking ===
Fujii has finished in the "Top 10" of the JSA's year-end prize money and game fee rankings nine times since 1993, and in the "Top 3" twice.

Year	Amount	Rank
1998	¥27,050,000	6th
1999	¥61,460,000	4th
2000	¥65,030,000	3rdh
2001	¥58,230,000	2nd
2002	¥34,170,000	6th
2005	¥19,810,000	9th
2006	¥25,060,000	7th
2010	¥24,100,000	8th
2012	¥17,050,000	9th

- Note: All amounts are given in Japanese yen and include prize money and fees earned from official tournaments and games held from January 1 to December 31.

== JSA director ==
Fujii was selected to Japan Shogi Association's board of directors as a non-executive director at association's 63rd General Meeting in June 2012. He served in that capacity until June 2014.
