= Torahiko Tanaka =

Japanese shogi player (born 1957)

- Native name: 田中寅彦
- Born: April 29, 1957 (age 69)
- Hometown: Toyonaka, Osaka

Career
- Achieved professional status: June 4, 1976 (aged 19)
- Badge number: 127
- Rank: 9-dan
- Retired: April 15, 2022 (aged 64)
- Teacher: Toshio Takayanagi (Honorary 9-dan)
- Major titles won: 1
- Tournaments won: 6
- Career record: 794–783 (.503)

Websites
- JSA profile page

Torahiko Tanaka (田中 寅彦, Tanaka Torahiko; born April 29, 1957) is a Japanese retired professional shogi player who achieved the rank of 9-dan. He is also a former Kisei title holder and a former senior managing director of the Japan Shogi Association.

== Early life and apprenticeship ==
Tanaka was born on April 29, 1957, in Toyonaka, Osaka. In 1971, he entered the Japan Shogi Association's apprentice school at the rank of 6-kyū under guidance of shogi professional Toshio Takayanagi. He was promoted to the 1-dan in May 1974, and obtained professional status and the rank of 4-dan in June 1976.

== Shogi professional ==
Tanaka's first championship as a professional came in 1981 when he defeated Hatasu Itō to 2 games to none to win the 12th Shinjin-Ō. He also won the 1st Quick Play Young Professionals Tournament (1982), the 5th All Star Kachinuki-sen (1982), the 34th NHK Cup (1984), the 17th Japan Shogi Association Cup (1984) and the 20th Quick Play Tournament (1986).

Tanaka's first appearance in a major title match came in the Spring of 1988 when he challenged Yoshikazu Minami for the 52nd Kisei title; Tanaka won the match 3 games to 2 for his only major title. The following autumn he was unable to defend his title against Makoto Nakahara, losing the 53rd Kisei title match by the same score.

Tanaka retired from professional shogi on April 15, 2022. He finished his career with a record of 794 wins and 783 losses.

=== Theoretical contributions ===
Tanaka earned the nickname "Edison of the opening" (序盤のエジソン (Joban no Ejison)), in reference to inventor Thomas Edison, for his innovations in the opening part of the game.

He helped popularize the Bear-in-the-hole castle as a castle for Counter-Ranging Rook Static Rook positions. At the time, the Bear-in-the-hole was used primarily for Ranging Rook positions.

The diagram below shows Tanaka (Black) using Static Rook position with an Incomplete Bear-in-the-hole castle in an October 1976 professional match. His opponent Daigorō Satō (White) is using a Third File Rook (developed from an earlier Fourth File Rook position).

Tanaka vs Satō 1976
☖ pieces in hand: –

9	8	7	6	5	4	3	2	1
香	桂		金					香	1
	王	銀		金			角		2
歩	歩	歩	歩	歩		桂	歩		3
				銀		飛		歩	4
			歩		歩	歩	歩		5
		歩	銀	歩					6
歩	歩	角			歩	歩		歩	7
香	銀			金			飛		8
玉	桂	金					桂	香	9

☗ pieces in hand: –
up to move 35

=== Promotion history ===
Tanaka's promotion history was as follows.

- 1972: 6-kyū
- 1974: 1-dan
- 1976, June 4: 4-dan
- 1981, April 1: 5-dan
- 1982, April 1: 6-dan
- 1983, April 1: 7-dan
- 1984, April 1: 8-dan
- 1994, December 16: 9-dan

=== Titles and other championships ===
Tanaka appeared in major title matches twice and has won one title. In addition to major titles, Tanaka has won six other shogi championships during his career.

=== Awards and honors ===
Tanaka received a number of Japan Shogi Association Annual Shogi Awards: "Best New Player" (1976), "Most Consecutive Games Won" (1976), "Best Winning Percentage" (1978, 1980, 1981 and 1983), the "Techinique Award" (1978 and 1988), and the "Fighting-spirit Award" (1981 and 1983). He also received the association's "Shogi Honor Award" in 2000 in recognition of winning 600 official games as a professional and the "25 Years Service Award" in 2001 in recognition of being an active professional for twenty-five years.

== JSA director ==
Tanaka served on the Japan Shogi Association's board of directors on multiple occasions. He was first elected as an executive director at the association's 56th General Meeting for a two-year term on May 26, 2005, and then re-elected to the same position in May 2007 and May 2011. He was re-elected as a director in December 2012, Tanaka was chosen to be the JSA's senior managing director to replace Kōji Tanigawa after the latter was chosen to replace Kunio Yonenaga, who died earlier in the month, as president.
