= Snowroof =

Static Rook opening in Japanese Chess

Snowroof position
☖ pieces in hand: –

9	8	7	6	5	4	3	2	1
									1
									2
									3
									4
							歩		5
歩		歩	歩	歩		歩			6
	歩		銀	銀	歩			歩	7
	角	金		金			飛		8
香	桂		玉				桂	香	9

☗ pieces in hand: –
Edo period Snowroof
☖ pieces in hand: –

9	8	7	6	5	4	3	2	1
					金	王	桂	香	1
	飛			金		銀			2
歩		桂		歩	歩	角	歩	歩	3
		歩	歩	銀		歩			4
	歩						歩		5
		歩	歩	歩		歩			6
歩	歩	角	銀	銀	歩			歩	7
		金		金			飛		8
香	桂		玉				桂	香	9

☗ pieces in hand: –
A Right Lance handicap game from 1709 in which Intatsu Itō (Black) is playing a Snowroof position against the sixth Lifetime Meijin Sōyo Ōhashi II (White) who is playing a Left Mino Static Rook position.

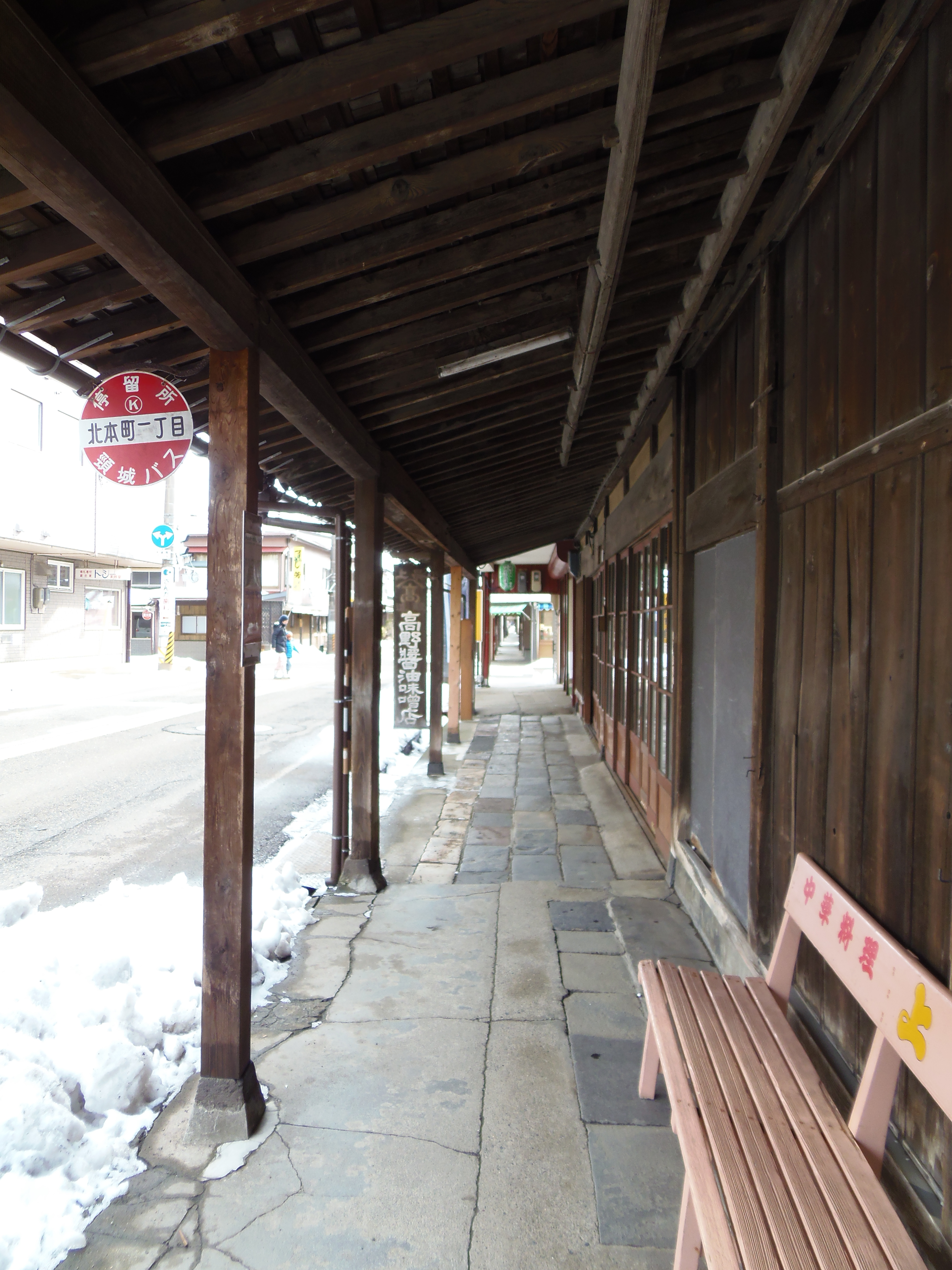
Snowroof covering sidewalk

In shogi, Snowroof or Snow Roof Fortress (雁木 gangi, lit. 'goose-wooden') is a Static Rook opening that characteristically uses a Snowroof castle.

It is named after the covered sidewalks (雁木造) connected to buildings in Niigata Prefecture.

Originating in the Edo period, the opening had been a less common one after World War II although it was popular in the prewar era. However, around 2017, the opening has become popular with professional shogi players. The Snowroof structure often appears in computer shogi games.

== Characteristics ==
Snowroof Castle
☖ pieces in hand: –

9	8	7	6	5	4	3	2	1
									1
									2
									3
									4
									5
		歩	歩	歩					6
歩	歩		銀	銀					7
	角	金		金					8
香	桂		玉						9

☗ pieces in hand: –

For Black, this castle positions the king on the 69 square while two golds are at the ears of king (78, 58) and the two silvers are on 67 and 57. The Snowroof castle is strong against attacks directly from above, especially attacks around the central file.

Fortress vs Snowroof
☖ pieces in hand: –

9	8	7	6	5	4	3	2	1
香	桂				王		桂	香	1
	飛			金		金	角		2
				銀	銀		歩	歩	3
歩		歩	歩	歩	歩	歩			4
	歩								5
		歩	歩	歩		歩			6
歩	歩	銀	金		歩			歩	7
		金			銀		飛		8
香	桂	角		玉			桂	香	9

☗ pieces in hand: 歩

Naitō (1981) notes that the Snowroof was once very popular and had a reputation for being very difficult for a Fortress opponent to defeat. However, by 1981, the Snowroof opening had become less popular because after the Snowroof's opponent trades off their rook pawn, the head of Snowroof player's bishop is vulnerable as it is only defended by an adjacent gold.

Snowroof Bishop-26
☖ pieces in hand: –

9	8	7	6	5	4	3	2	1
									1
									2
									3
									4
							歩		5
歩		歩	歩	歩		歩	角		6
	歩		銀	銀	歩			歩	7
		金		金			飛		8
香	桂		玉				桂	香	9

☗ pieces in hand: –

Initially, the bishop remains on its starting 88 square. In attack development, this bishop is often moved to the 26 square via three moves passing through B-77 and B-59.

Attacking on the fourth file is common by moving the rook to that file supporting an advancing right silver. However, it is also possible to attack on the third file (Sleeve Rook).

=== Snowroof game examples ===
Hirotsu vs Katsūra 1977
☖ pieces in hand: –

9	8	7	6	5	4	3	2	1
香					金	角	桂	香	1
	飛		銀			王			2
歩		桂	歩		金	銀	歩	歩	3
		歩		歩	歩	歩			4
	歩						歩		5
		歩	歩	歩		歩			6
歩	歩		銀	銀	歩			歩	7
		金		金			飛		8
香	桂	玉		角			桂	香	9

☗ pieces in hand: –

Hisao Hirotsu (Black) used a Snowroof castle against Osamu Katsuura's Fortress position in a 1977 Kisei tournament game on January 11. Here, Hirotsu has completed his Snowroof castle and has moved his king leftward for safety to the 79 square aiming for the 88 square. His bishop has moved to the 59 square (via B-77) and is still defending the 86 square while it may also be developed for attacking. From this 59 square, the bishop may be mobilized on 26 or 37 (since the third pawn has been pushed to 36).

Katsuura (White) has partially completed his Fortress castle, which has been constructed with the Quick Fortress method (which saves one tempo). Since Katsuura's bishop has already been pulled back to 31 on the 31–97 diagonal, he has the possibility of aiming for an eighth file pawn trade plus a bishop trade via ...P-86, Px86 Bx86, Bx86 Rx86 (which actually occurs in the game after this position).

Toyoshima vs Habu 2014
☖ pieces in hand: –

9	8	7	6	5	4	3	2	1
香					王		桂	香	1
	飛			金		金			2
歩		桂		銀	銀		歩	歩	3
	角	歩	歩	歩	歩	歩			4
	歩						歩		5
		歩	歩	歩					6
歩	歩	銀	金	銀	歩	歩		歩	7
香		金	角				飛		8
玉	桂						桂	香	9

☗ pieces in hand: –

Yoshiharu Habu (White) used a Snowroof castle against Masayuki Toyoshima's Fortress position in a 2014 Asahi Open tournament on February 2.

Habu's Snowroof has been completed. His bishop has been developed completely out of the castle to its attacking position on 84 and his right knight has developed to 73 for attacking as well. Toyoshima constructed a Complete Fortress castle with his right silver on 57 (instead of playing a more common Silver-37 formation) that was subsequently developed into a Fortress Anaguma castle.

=== Silver Fortress development ===
Silver Fortress
☖ pieces in hand: –

9	8	7	6	5	4	3	2	1
									1
									2
									3
									4
									5
		歩	歩	歩					6
歩	歩	銀	銀						7
	玉	金							8
香	桂								9

☗ pieces in hand: –

One way to improve upon the Snowroof castle's weakness is to develop it into a Silver Fortress.

A Silver Fortress is also structurally more flexible than the typical Gold Fortress.

However, building a Silver Fortress from a Snowroof castle takes several moves. Thus, taking this Snowroof to Silver Fortress approach will probably cause a player to have a strictly defensive position.

==== Game example ====
Kimi vs Hanada 1922
up to move #30
☖ pieces in hand: –

9	8	7	6	5	4	3	2	1
香	桂				王		桂	香	1
	飛			金		金	角		2
				銀	銀		歩	歩	3
歩		歩	歩	歩	歩	歩			4
	歩								5
		歩	歩	歩	歩	歩	歩	歩	6
歩	歩	角	銀	銀					7
		金		金			飛		8
香	桂		玉				桂	香	9

☗ pieces in hand: –
Kimi vs Hanada 1922
up to move #32
☖ pieces in hand: –

9	8	7	6	5	4	3	2	1
香	桂				王		桂	香	1
	飛			金	銀	金	角		2
					銀		歩	歩	3
歩		歩	歩	歩	歩	歩			4
	歩								5
		歩	歩	歩	歩	歩	歩	歩	6
歩	歩	角	銀	銀					7
		金		金			飛		8
香	桂	玉					桂	香	9

☗ pieces in hand: –

Kimi vs Hanada 1922
up to move #34
☖ pieces in hand: –

9	8	7	6	5	4	3	2	1
香	桂				王		桂	香	1
	飛			金		金	角		2
					銀	銀	歩	歩	3
歩		歩	歩	歩	歩	歩			4
	歩						歩		5
		歩	歩	歩	歩	歩		歩	6
歩	歩	角	銀	銀					7
		金		金			飛		8
香	桂	玉					桂	香	9

☗ pieces in hand: –
Kimi vs Hanada 1922
up to move #36
☖ pieces in hand: –

9	8	7	6	5	4	3	2	1
香	桂				王		桂	香	1
		飛		金		金	角		2
					銀	銀	歩	歩	3
歩		歩	歩	歩	歩	歩			4
	歩						歩		5
		歩	歩	歩	歩	歩		歩	6
歩	歩		銀	銀					7
		金		金			飛		8
香	桂	玉		角			桂	香	9

☗ pieces in hand: –

Kinjirō Kimi (木見金治郎) vs Chōtarō Hanada (花田長太郎)

Double Snowroof position

Hanada (White) develops his Snowroof castle into a Silver Fortress castle along with a Sleeve Rook formation.

=== Right King development ===
Right King Snowroof
☖ pieces in hand: –

9	8	7	6	5	4	3	2	1
									1
									2
									3
									4
							歩		5
歩		歩	歩	歩	歩	歩			6
	歩		銀	銀	金			歩	7
	角	金			玉		飛		8
香	桂						桂	香	9

☗ pieces in hand: –

The basic Snowroof formation can transition to a Right King-like structure in which the king and right gold move upward to the fourth file.

== Bishop Exchange Declined development ==
Closed Diagonal
☖ pieces in hand: –

9	8	7	6	5	4	3	2	1
香	桂	銀	金	王		銀	桂	香	1
	飛					金	角		2
歩		歩	歩	歩			歩	歩	3
					歩	歩			4
	歩								5
		歩					歩		6
歩	歩	角	歩	歩	歩	歩		歩	7
	銀	金					飛		8
香	桂			玉	金	銀	桂	香	9

☗ pieces in hand: –
5...P-44
after 1.P-76 P-84 2.P-26 P-85
3.B-77 G-32 4.G-78 P-34 5.S-88
Closed Diagonal
☖ pieces in hand: –

9	8	7	6	5	4	3	2	1
香	桂	銀	金	王	金	銀	桂	香	1
	飛						角		2
歩		歩	歩	歩			歩	歩	3
					歩	歩			4
	歩								5
		歩					歩		6
歩	歩	角	歩	歩	歩	歩		歩	7
	銀						飛		8
香	桂		金	玉	金	銀	桂	香	9

☗ pieces in hand: –
4...P-44
after 1.P-76 P-84 2.P-26 P-85
3.B-77 P-34 4.S-88

In the 3.B-77 variation of the Bishop Exchange opening, White has a narrow window before making the bishop trade during which they can depart from the opening by closing their bishop diagonal with ...P-44 after it has been opened. After they do so, their position can be developed into a Snowroof strategy. Black's position will likely be some form of Fortress since Black's silver is on the 88 square; however, some professional players have also played other unnamed Static Rook positions as Black.

One reason for playing this move is that White wishes to avoid the large body of theory associated with Bishop Exchange (or Fortress, which also has a large amount of theory behind it) and so chooses a Snowroof form.

Another note about these positions concerns Black's left silver. 4.S-88 is the most common move in Bishop Exchange. However, moving the silver to the 88 square will restrict Black to a Fortress position since the silver cannot be moved to 78 for Left Mino or to 67 for Snowroof. (If Black wishes to keep other options open, then either 4.S-78 or 4.S-68 would have needed to be used instead. 4.S-68 is used for Snowroof while 4.S-78 is the most flexible being compatible with Fortress, Snowroof, and Left Mino.)

If Black wishes to prevent White's Snowroof development from the usual Bishop Exchange opening sequences (that is, 1.P-76 P-84 2.P-26 P-85), then Black will need to use an early 3.P-25 variation.

Bishop Exchange Declined
☖ pieces in hand: –

9	8	7	6	5	4	3	2	1
香	桂	銀	金	王		銀	桂	香	1
	飛					金	角		2
歩		歩	歩	歩			歩	歩	3
					歩	歩			4
	歩						歩		5
		歩							6
歩	歩	角	歩	歩	歩	歩		歩	7
	銀	金					飛		8
香	桂			玉	金	銀	桂	香	9

☗ pieces in hand: –
6.P-25
Bishop Exchange Declined
☖ pieces in hand: –

9	8	7	6	5	4	3	2	1
香	桂	銀	金	王		銀	桂	香	1
	飛					金			2
歩		歩	歩	歩		角	歩	歩	3
					歩	歩			4
	歩						歩		5
		歩							6
歩	歩	角	歩	歩	歩	歩		歩	7
	銀	金					飛		8
香	桂			玉	金	銀	桂	香	9

☗ pieces in hand: –
6...B-33

6.P-25. Once White has declined Bishop Exchange, Black is likely to press forward with a rook pawn aiming to exchange off their second file pawn.

6...B-33. Here White can prevent Black's rook pawn exchange by defending the 24 square with their bishop.

Although 6...G-33 would also prevent the pawn exchange, the gold on 33 is thought to be a bad configuration.

Snowroof
☖ pieces in hand: –

9	8	7	6	5	4	3	2	1
香	桂	銀	金	王		銀	桂	香	1
	飛					金			2
歩		歩	歩	歩		角	歩	歩	3
					歩	歩			4
	歩						歩		5
		歩							6
歩	歩	角	歩	歩	歩	歩		歩	7
	銀	金					飛		8
香	桂			玉	金	銀	桂	香	9

☗ pieces in hand: –
6...B-33

Here White has closed their bishop diagonal (...P-44) and prevented the second file pawn exchange with 6...B-33.

If White is aiming for Snowroof, 6...B-33 is very likely. But, White can also play Snowroof lines that do not stop the pawn exchange, in which case White will play 6...S-42 instead. Then, the pawn exchange 7.P-24 Px24 8.Rx24 is met with 8...S-43, in which the silver protects the pawns on the 34 and 44 squares. However, Yasuhiro Masuda suggests that these are difficult lines and recommends 6...B-33 in spite of the fact that computer shogi engines often play 6...S-42.

Snowroof
☖ pieces in hand: –

9	8	7	6	5	4	3	2	1
香	桂	銀	金	王			桂	香	1
	飛				銀	金			2
歩		歩	歩	歩		角	歩	歩	3
					歩	歩			4
	歩						歩		5
		歩							6
歩	歩	角	歩	歩	歩	歩		歩	7
	銀	金			銀		飛		8
香	桂			玉	金		桂	香	9

☗ pieces in hand: –
7.S-48 S-42
Snowroof
☖ pieces in hand: –

9	8	7	6	5	4	3	2	1
香	桂	銀	金	王			桂	香	1
	飛					金			2
歩		歩	歩	歩	銀	角	歩	歩	3
					歩	歩			4
	歩						歩		5
		歩							6
歩	歩	角	歩	歩	歩	歩		歩	7
	銀	金			銀		飛		8
香	桂		玉		金		桂	香	9

☗ pieces in hand: –
8.K-69 S-43

7.S-48. Black develops their right offensive silver.

7...S-42. White develops their left silver up to the fourth file for the castle.

8.K-69. Black starts to castle their king leftward. Since their castle will be a Fortress castle (as their silver is on 88), the king cannot move to the 68 square because this would block the bishop from moving to 68, which is necessary to make way for the silver to move 77 while maintaining defense of the 86 square (to prevent White's rook pawn exchange).

8...S-43. With this White completes the basic shape of the Snowroof castle.

After this Black will need to arrange their pieces to construct the Fortress castle and decide upon an attacking strategy. A common idea is to push the fifth file pawn and aim to exchange off the bishops with their bishop moved back to 68. Another is to push the fourth file pawn for a Reclining Silver formation. Since Fortress requires many moves to construct, Black needs to wary that White may attack first. White can develop their pieces naturally and has various attacking options available to them (e.g. using a traditional Snowroof formation with the right silver on 53 possibly paired with a Right Fourth File Rook attack or a Silver Horns structure with the silver on 63 that could shift to Reclining Silver).

== Double Snowroof ==
The Double Snowroof (相雁木 ai-gangi) opening has both players utilizing Snowroof castles.

=== Old Double Snowroof opening ===
Old Double Snowroof
☖ pieces in hand: –

9	8	7	6	5	4	3	2	1
香	桂	銀	金	王		銀	桂	香	1
	飛					金	角		2
歩		歩	歩	歩	歩		歩	歩	3
						歩			4
	歩						歩		5
		歩							6
歩	歩		歩	歩	歩	歩		歩	7
	角	金					飛		8
香	桂	銀		玉	金	銀	桂	香	9

☗ pieces in hand: –
Old Double Snowroof
☖ pieces in hand: 歩

9	8	7	6	5	4	3	2	1
香	桂	銀	金	王		銀	桂	香	1
	飛					金	角		2
歩		歩	歩	歩	歩			歩	3
						歩	飛		4
	歩								5
		歩							6
歩	歩		歩	歩	歩	歩		歩	7
	角	金							8
香	桂	銀		玉	金	銀	桂	香	9

☗ pieces in hand: 歩

This is an older opening used in the 20th century up until the end of World War II after which it lost popularity.

Double Snowroof can be developed from an older variant of the Double Wing Attack opening that uses advanced pawns on the central file supported by the right silver.

1. P-76 P-34, 2. P-26 P-84, 3. P-25 P-85, 4. G-78 G-32. An open bishop diagonal variation of the Double Wing is used as is common of the era. (See Double Wing Attack § Open bishop diagonal variation.)

5. P-24 Px24, 6. Rx24. Black trades off the second file rook pawns.

Old Double Snowroof
☖ pieces in hand: –

9	8	7	6	5	4	3	2	1
香	桂	銀	金	王		銀	桂	香	1
	飛					金	角		2
歩		歩	歩	歩	歩		歩	歩	3
						歩			4
	歩								5
		歩							6
歩	歩		歩	歩	歩	歩		歩	7
	角	金					飛		8
香	桂	銀		玉	金	銀	桂	香	9

☗ pieces in hand: 歩
Old Double Snowroof
☖ pieces in hand: 歩

9	8	7	6	5	4	3	2	1
香	桂	銀	金	王		銀	桂	香	1
	飛					金	角		2
歩		歩	歩	歩	歩		歩	歩	3
						歩			4
									5
		歩							6
歩	歩		歩	歩	歩	歩		歩	7
	角	金					飛		8
香	桂	銀		玉	金	銀	桂	香	9

☗ pieces in hand: 歩

6...P*23, 7. R-28. White fortifies the second file by dropping the pawn back to its original position at the head of bishop. Black retreats their rook to its starting position.

7...P-86, 8. Px86 Rx86, 9. P*87 R-82. White does the same as Black resulting in a Double Retreating Rook variation of Double Wing.

Old Double Snowroof
☖ pieces in hand: 歩

9	8	7	6	5	4	3	2	1
香	桂				王		桂	香	1
	飛			金		金	角		2
				銀	銀		歩		3
歩		歩	歩	歩	歩	歩		歩	4
									5
歩		歩	歩	歩	歩	歩		歩	6
	歩		銀	銀					7
	角	金		金			飛		8
香	桂		玉				桂	香	9

☗ pieces in hand: 歩
1930s and 1940s formation

Old Double Snowroof
☖ pieces in hand: 歩

9	8	7	6	5	4	3	2	1
香	桂			角			桂	香	1
	飛			金		金	王		2
				銀	銀		歩		3
歩		歩	歩	歩	歩	歩		歩	4
									5
歩		歩	歩	歩	歩	歩		歩	6
	歩		銀	銀					7
	玉	金		金		飛			8
香	桂			角			桂	香	9

☗ pieces in hand: 歩
king safety, bishop development, Sleeve Rook formation

10. S-48 S-62

11. P-56 P-54

12. K-69 K-41

13. S-57 S-53

14. P-16 P-14

15. P-96 P-94

16. P-36 P-74

17. G-58 G-52

18. P-46 P-64

19. P-66 P-44

20. S-68 S-42

21. S-67 S-43

== Silver Horns Snowroof ==
Silver Horns Snowroof
☖ pieces in hand: –

9	8	7	6	5	4	3	2	1
									1
									2
									3
							歩		4
									5
歩		歩	歩		歩	歩		歩	6
	歩		銀	歩	銀	桂			7
	角	金		金					8
香	桂		玉				飛	香	9

☗ pieces in hand: –

ツノ銀雁木 tsuno gin gangi

The Silver Horns variant of Snowrook positions the right silver on the 47 square instead of the 57 square as in the traditional Snowroof. This formation allows the possibility of a Reclining Silver development where the right silver moves up to 56.

=== Silver Horns Snowroof game examples ===
Segawa vs Kadokura 2017
☖ pieces in hand: –

9	8	7	6	5	4	3	2	1
香							桂	香	1
	飛			金	王	金			2
歩		桂	銀	歩	銀	角	歩	歩	3
		歩	歩		歩	歩			4
	歩						歩		5
歩		歩	歩	歩		歩		歩	6
	歩	銀	金		歩	銀			7
	角	玉					飛		8
香	桂		金				桂	香	9

☗ pieces in hand: –

Keita Kadokura (White) used a Silver Horns Snowroof castle against Shōji Segawa's Fortress position in a 2017 Ōza tournament on October 22.

=== Silver Horns Snowroof Right King ===
Silver Horns Snowroof Right King
☖ pieces in hand: –

9	8	7	6	5	4	3	2	1
									1
									2
									3
							歩		4
									5
歩		歩	歩		歩	歩		歩	6
	歩		銀	歩	銀	桂			7
	角	金		金	玉				8
香	桂						飛	香	9

☗ pieces in hand: –

Like the regular Snowroof formation, there is a Right King variant of the Silver Horns Snowroof (ツノ銀雁木右玉 tsuno gin gangi migi gyoku).

Watanabe vs Kamiya 2016
☖ pieces in hand: 歩

9	8	7	6	5	4	3	2	1
香							桂	香	1
	飛		王	金		金			2
歩		桂	銀	歩	銀	角	歩	歩	3
		歩	歩		歩	歩			4
	歩						歩		5
		歩	歩	歩	銀	歩			6
歩	歩	銀	金		歩			歩	7
		玉					飛		8
香	桂	角	金				桂	香	9

☗ pieces in hand: 歩
up to move 31

The adjacent diagram shows a game position between Hiromu Watanabe (Black) and Hiroshi Kamiya (White) from August 2016. Kamiya is using a Right King position with his king castled rightward (instead of leftward) on the 62 square near his rook on the eight file and his silvers on the 63 and 43 squares. His bishop has advanced to the 33 square in order to prevent Watanabe from trading off his rook pawn. His opponent Watanabe is using a Fortress castle (via the tempo-saving Quick Fortress method) that has not been fully completed (his left gold remains on its starting 69 square) and his king has still not fully entered the castle.

== See also ==
- Right Fourth File Rook
- Sleeve Rook
- Static Rook

== Bibliography ==
- Fairbairn, John (1980). "How to play the centre game part 1". Shogi (27): 17–18.
- Fairbairn, John (1980). "How to play the centre game part 2". Shogi (28): 14–15.
- Fairbairn, John (1981). "How to play the fortress opening part 1". Shogi (29): 4–6.
- 金井, 恒太 [Kanai, Kōta] (2017). "相掛かり&ツノ銀雁木—広がり続ける力戦模様—". 将棋世界 (November): xx.
- 稲葉, 陽 [Inaba, Akira] (2018). 新型雁木のすべて. マイナビ出版. ISBN 978-4-83996-710-9.
- Katō, Jirō [加藤治郎]. 2000. 将棋の公式. 東京書店.
- 北島, 忠雄 [Kitajima, Tadao] (2017). "駒組みから仕掛けまで". 将棋世界 (November): xx.
- 小林, 裕士 [Kobayashi, Hiroshi] (2019). 急所を直撃!: とっておきの雁木破り. マイナビ出版. ISBN 978-4-83996-914-1.
- Kogure, Katsuhiro [小暮克洋] & Toshiyuki Moriuchi. 1999. 雁木でガンガン!! 主婦と生活社.
- Mainichi Communications [毎日コミュニケーションズ] (ed.). 2002. 雁木伝説 雁木の秘法を伝授. 毎日コミュニケーションズ.
- 増田, 康宏 [Masuda, Yasuhiro] (2017). "ツノ銀雁木講座: 時代は矢倉から雁木へ 自由自在、増田流雁木". 将棋世界 (November): xx.
- 増田, 康宏 [Masuda, Yasuhiro] (2018). "雁木編". 増田康宏の新・将棋観. マイナビ出版. pp. 7–64. ISBN 978-4-83996-752-9.
- Naitō, Kunio (1981). "Breaking into the enemy camp part 9". Shogi (31): 10–13.
- Shūkan Shōgi [週刊将棋]. 1991. 雁木伝説. 毎日コミュニケーションズ.
- 鈴木, 宏彦 [Suzuki, Hirohiko] (2017). "基本講座: 雁木、その不思議な呼び名の由来". 将棋世界 (November): xx.
- "ザ・雁木: ▲8八銀 5六歩型の駒組み". 増田康宏の将棋講座. Episode 2. 2017. 銀河将棋チャンネル – via Niconico.
