= King's Head Vanguard Pawn =

Shogi opening

King Head Vanguard Pawn
☖ pieces in hand: –

9	8	7	6	5	4	3	2	1
									1
									2
									3
									4
	歩	歩					歩		5
		銀	歩	歩			飛		6
歩		角	金	銀	歩	歩		歩	7
	玉	金							8
香	桂						桂	香	9

☗ pieces in hand: –

In shogi, King's Head Vanguard Pawn or King's Side Vanguard Pawn (玉頭位取りgyoku tō kuraidori) is a Static Rook opening.

This opening utilizes a Boat castle in which the king (if played by Black) is positioned on 78 square. The pawn referred to then is the one on the seventh file that is originally at the head of the castled king (77).

The term vanguard pawn (位取り kuraidori, literally "position taking") refers to a positioning of a pawn advanced to the middle rank supported by generals as a phalanx-like attacking formation.

This pawn becomes a vanguard pawn by advancing to the middle rank 5 (75 square) supported by the left silver at the 76 square.

== Overview ==
In the case of Black, the silver takes position at the 7th file, and is placed at 76. If the game is played well, it will be difficult for the ranging rook side to make progress in castling and to utilize the right knight. On the other hand, the static rook's king will have wide room, and it will be in a thick formation that cannot be easily defeated, and there will be no shortage of attacks available from the position. In actual play, as seen in the diagram, there are cases in which the game is also played from the 8th or 6th files. The winning pattern of this strategy is basically to avoid fighting in the opening of the game and to keep the positions alive from the middle-game to the endgame. If multiple positions are gained, then the player can show an attack on the king's head to put pressure on the opponent while gathering pieces for the endgame.

However, it is said to have the disadvantage that it takes a lot of moves until the formation is completed, and the king's line is unstable in the middle of the move, allowing a Fourth File Rook to attack first with S-44 and P-55, and allowing a Third File Rook to switch to Ishida style, and also allowing Ranging Rook to set up a position to its advantage. To escape the pressure, building an Anaguma castle is also a strong countermeasure.

Although it is very similar to a Static Rook Anaguma as a tactic that prevents a sudden turnover once it becomes advantageous, it is also a fact that Anaguma, which has the characteristic of being very hard to checkmate, can simplify the reading at the endgame. When the superiority of Static Rook Anaguma became apparent, it became relatively obsolete, and the number of times King's Vanguard Head appears in professional tournaments has decreased drastically. During the heyday of the Fujii System, there was a possibility that it would become popular again as an endurance strategy for Static Rook, but it never regained its mainstream position as an endurance strategy due to the decline of the Fujii system.

== Introduction ==
High Silver Fortress
☖ pieces in hand: –

9	8	7	6	5	4	3	2	1
									1
									2
									3
									4
		歩							5
		銀	歩	歩					6
歩	歩		金						7
	玉	金							8
香	桂								9

☗ pieces in hand: –

The King's Head Vanguard Pawn position uses a High Silver Fortress castle.

Ishida vs King's Head Vanguard Pawn
☖ pieces in hand: –

9	8	7	6	5	4	3	2	1
香	桂						桂	香	1
						金	王		2
		歩	歩	銀	金	角			3
歩	飛			歩	歩	銀		歩	4
	歩	歩				歩	歩		5
歩		飛	歩	歩	歩			歩	6
	歩	桂	銀	角	金	歩	歩		7
香						銀	玉		8
					金		桂	香	9

☗ pieces in hand: –

== See also ==
- Static Rook

== Bibliography ==
- Aono, Teruichi (1983). Guide to shogi openings: Unlock the secrets of joseki 将棋定跡のカギ: 和英 定跡問題集. Translated by Fairbairn, John. 山海堂. ISBN 4-381-00598-8.
- Fairbairn, John (1986). Shogi for beginners (2nd ed.). Ishi Press. ISBN 978-4-8718-720-10.
- Hosking, Tony (1996). The art of shogi. The Shogi Foundation. ISBN 978-0-95310-890-9.
- Katsumata, Kiyokazu [in Japanese] (2003). 消えた戦法の謎. 毎日コミュニケーションズ. ISBN 4-8399-1091-X.
- Kitao, Madoka (2011). Joseki at a glance. Translated by Kawasaki, Tomohide. Nekomado. ISBN 978-4-9052-2501-0.
- Morishita, Taku (1997). 将棋基本戦法 振り飛車編. 日本将棋連盟. ISBN 4-8197-0334-X.
