= Fujii System =

Fujii System vs Static Rook
☖ pieces in hand: –

9	8	7	6	5	4	3	2	1
香	桂				金	銀	桂	香	1
	飛						王		2
歩		歩	歩	銀	金	角	歩	歩	3
				歩	歩	歩			4
	歩		歩					歩	5
		歩			歩	歩			6
歩	歩	角	銀	歩		桂	歩		7
			飛	金		銀			8
香	桂			玉	金			香	9

☗ pieces in hand: –

In shogi, the Fujii System (藤井システム fujii shisutemu) is a set of Fourth File Rook strategies used against various Static Rook strategies. It was created as a way to attack Static Rook Anaguma castle positions.

It is named after Takeshi Fujii who invented the strategies, which awarded him the prestigious Kōzō Masuda Award in 1998. The system can also be applied for Third File Rook strategies.

== Overview ==
The Fujii system is a set of strategies for Fourth and Third File Rook openings developed by Takeshi Fujii. In particular, the Fujii System attracted a good deal of attention as a countermeasure against Static Rook Anaguma with Fujii himself playing a prominent role.

As described below, the Fujii System includes countermeasures against Left Mino castles as well as Anaguma castles. In the latter case, characteristically, if the opponent is aiming for an Anaguma, the strategy consists of initiating a fight before the king can be completely castled into the Anaguma with the quick attack leading to the abandoning of the opponent's Anaguma and then dominating by way of the solidness of the Fujii System player's Mino castle. Since it typically involves the arrangement of pieces both in defense and offense across the player's whole camp rather than the move of a particular piece, it is called a system instead of a single opening.

Traditionally, when the Static Rook side went for a slow game strategy, they would use Center Vanguard Pawn or King's Head Vanguard Pawn to go from a Boat castle to a Fortress and so on, hence choosing advanced castles, particularly due to the fragility to mate races from the side. However, due to the development of Left Mino and Static Rook Anaguma strategies for Static Rook, which allowed as much or more solidness than the Ranging Rook opponent, the winning percentage of Ranging Rook decreased dramatically. This trend became obvious when comparing the winning percentages of top players – Yoshiharu Habu, Toshiyuki Moriuchi, Yasumitsu Satō and Akira Watanabe – when playing Static Rook Anaguma. For instance, Satō was achieving a winning percentage of above 70% (except for a 58.8% when playing White), and Habu a total (as Black and White) win rate exceeding 90%. (In comparison, the overall winning percentage when playing Black is slightly above 50%.)

For that reason, while taking measures against Left Mino and Static Rook Anaguma, it became necessary to have a comprehensive, well-equipped way of attacking from the static rock traditional right silver quick attack and so on. In the Fujii system:

- Against Left Mino, don't allow the ideal formation to occur, aim for a battle for the King's head.
- Against Static Rook Anaguma, first of all don't let Anaguma to be formed or aim for a battle to occur before it gets formed. This includes attacking the rival's king as they're building Anaguma as if it were a sitting king, going back from ranging rook to static rook, or gathering power along the edge as if Spearing the Sparrow.

It underlies Kenji Kobayashi Super Fourth File Rook strategy as well as Masataka Sugimoto's research.

== History ==
=== The decline in Ranging Rook Strategies ===
Before the Fujii system became widely known, as players using static rook felt uncomfortable in quick attacks against ranging rook strategies, openings which castled the king solidly like Left Mino or Static Rook Anaguma were found effective. As these castles were as solid or more than ranging rook's Mino castles, this turned further into slow game situations where only the static rook side had the liberty of initiating the attack. Furthermore, as ranging rook players had no effective countermeasure, the number of players choosing ranging rook openings declined.

As a ranging rook (Fourth File Rook) player himself, Fujii had been struggling to find ways to cope with Static Rook Anaguma and Left Mino, displaying when playing ranging rook a Silver Crown castle against left Mino, in the process of which (in the situation S-2g, K-3i, G-4g, G4i) the rook returned to the right flank with the goal of storming on the Left Mino king's head (e.g., in his 1995 All Japan Professional Shogi tournament game against Hisashi Namekata). Although this occurred previous to the development of the Fujii system, the attack on the left Mino king's head is a common goal.

=== The Fujii System against Left Mino ===
Fujii System against Left Mino
☖ pieces in hand: –

9	8	7	6	5	4	3	2	1
香	桂				金	角	桂	香	1
	飛			金		銀			2
歩			歩		歩	銀	玉		3
		歩		歩		歩	歩	歩	4
	歩		歩		歩				5
		歩				歩	歩	歩	6
歩	歩	角	銀	歩		桂			7
			飛	金		銀			8
香	桂				金	王		香	9

☗ pieces in hand: –

Originally, the Fujii system developed as an investigation on how to counter Left Mino. Due to the peculiar formation of left Mino, and particularly of Castle Tower Mino, it was very difficult for Ranging Rook openings to invade it.

After breaking through along the rook file, it would turn into an attack from the side, but while the king from the ranging rook's side would be on the rank 1 or rank 2, the Static Rook side's king will be on rank 3, so that when it came to an attacking race Ranging Rook would often lose in terms of number of moves. So, in order to attack the Castle Tower Mino, instead of attacking from the side, an attack from the vertical, aimed at its weak point on the king's head, started to intermingle. In the case of Black (Sente), following the placing of the king on 39, with P-45 the rival won't be allowed to build up his ideal four-pieces Mino, and you will aim at attacking the king's head with P-26. However, if the decision to push P-26 occurs too soon, White can aim to attack with the bishop from 53, so it is necessary to be very careful.

Akira Shima in the NHK Cup playing White against Fujii system won after being forced to build a High Mino following black's B-57, by then attacking the knight's head. From there on the usual formation became pushing black's pawn to 56, and after switching to a Third File Rook pushing the bishop to 68 hence making a direct attack on the king's head, and attacking together with the right knight. To put it simply, the measures of ▲P-25, △Px25, ▲Nx25 are harsh, too, and unless the bishop is at 31 the silver cannot be drawn back to 22 (▲P*24 is possible) when keeping the bishop's diagonal open, this turns into a development in which the static rook player has to be paying close attention always.

This is an unusually completed opening, and Left Mino is now barely ever seen among professionals when playing against Fourth File Rook.

=== The Fujii System against Anaguma ===
Fujii System against Anaguma
☖ pieces in hand: –

9	8	7	6	5	4	3	2	1
香	桂		金		金	銀	桂		1
	飛						玉	香	2
歩		歩	歩		歩		歩	歩	3
				歩	銀	歩	角		4
	歩		歩		歩		桂	歩	5
		歩				歩			6
歩	歩	角		歩			歩		7
		銀	飛	金		銀			8
香	桂			王	金			香	9

☗ pieces in hand: –

What has turned currently into the prevailing variation in the Fujii system is a so-called new version that came to be as a result of the investigation against Static Rook Anaguma strategies. It is become a strategy that combines both a quick vertical attack before the Static Rook Anaguma castle can be completed, relying on the bishop's diagonal as its key point, and counter-measures against static rook quick attacks.

In Black's (sente) case, a quick attack is started on the king by pushing on the pawn on the 1st file, as if it were a sitting king. If White's lance moves to 12 and the king manages to enter the hole in Anaguma, Black will then attack with N-25, and then P-45 and by opening the bishop's diagonal. If White (gote) goes instead for an early fight, Black will switch to K-48, and then K-39 and then to a Mino castle. Although it is often thought that the distinctive initial movements are easy to imitate, it is unusually difficult even for professionals to play them thoroughly, hence the popular saying "No one but Fujii can play the Fujii system."

=== The Fujii System and the Millennium Castle ===
Because the Fujii system made it difficult for the static rook player to build Anaguma, many counter-measures were developed. One of them, appearing around the year 2000, is the Millennium castle. It is characterized by the fact that even though weaker in solidness compared to Anaguma, (white's) king being castled in 21 means not receiving direct attacks on the bishop's diagonal.

Up until then, the ranging rook would break down Anaguma by relying on the bishop's diagonal, as well as its subsequent development in 3rd File Rook's "Isao Nakata XP" tactic, posing a threat on the Static Rook Anaguma's king by way of the bishop's diagonal. For that reason, the Millennium castle that avoided the bishop's diagonal aimed at by the Fujii system's gained considerable influence.

Although the Millennium castle showed new developments against the Fujii system, in terms of the number of moves it took it lacked the solidity of Anaguma and the ranging rook players took advantage of that time by showing counter-measures against the building of Anaguma, so a perfect counter-measure was actually never reached. As a consequence of these particulars, this opening is almost never played against Fourth File Rook's Fujii system. In turn, against Third File Rook's Fujii system, since it has no effects on the quick attacks it has still considerable popularity.

== Development ==
Fujii System
☖ pieces in hand: –

9	8	7	6	5	4	3	2	1
香	桂					銀	桂	香	1
	飛					金	王		2
歩		歩	歩	銀	金	角	歩	歩	3
				歩	歩	歩			4
	歩		歩					歩	5
		歩			歩	歩			6
歩	歩	角	銀	歩	銀	桂	歩		7
			飛	金					8
香	桂			玉	金			香	9

☗ pieces in hand: –

1. P-76 2. P-34, 3. P-66 4. P-84, 5. R-68 6. S-62, 7. P-16 8. K-42, 9. S-38 10. K-32, 11. S-78 12. P-54, 13. S-67 14. G61-52, 15. P-15 16. S-53, 17. G69-58 18. P-85, 19. B-77 20. B-33, 21. P-46 22. K-22, 23. P-36 24. P-44, 25. N-37 26. G-43, 27. P-65 28. G-32, 29. S-47

Black is employing a Fourth File Rook Fujii System position. Black's king remains in its start position. The left silver that formed a Mino castle earlier has been moved to the 47 square to protect the head of the knight that has been developed to 37 for attacking. The left edge pawn has been pushed all the way to the middle rank 5. Black's right silver is advanced to the 67 square and the bishop diagonal has been opened by pushing the sixth file pawn to 65 allowing the bishop to attack the diagonal that White's king is positioned on (22 square) and will continue to be on if White chooses an Anaguma castle (21 square).

== See also ==
- Fourth File Rook
- Ranging Rook
- Static Rook Anaguma

== Bibliography ==
- 『将棋世界』2006年3月号「勝又教授のこれならわかる! 最新戦法講義」藤井システムはどこに消えた? の巻
- 勝又清和『最新戦法の話』（浅川書房、2007年、ISBN 978-4-86137-016-8）
- 『将棋世界』の連載をまとめたもの。藤井システムについては2章を割いて解説している（第3講 後手藤井システムの話（57 - 94ページ）、第4講 先手藤井システムの話（95 - 118ページ））。
- Kitao, Madoka (2011). Joseki at a glance. Translated by Kawasaki, Tomohide. Nekomado. ISBN 978-4-9052-2501-0.
- 佐藤和俊『緩急自在の新戦法！ 三間飛車藤井システム』（マイナビ出版、2018年、ISBN 978-4839966508）
