= Third File Rook =

Class of Ranging Rook openings

In shogi, Third File Rook (三間飛車 sangenbisha or sankenbisha) is a class of Ranging Rook openings in which the rook is positioned on the third file if played by White or the seventh file if played by Black.

== Types ==
There are two basic forms of Third File Rook. The first form is similar to other normal Ranging Rook openings such as Fourth File Rook. Here, the bishop is moved to the 77 square (Black) or the 33 square (White) often in order to prevent a Static Rook opponent's pawn exchange on the eighth (or second) file.

The other Third File Rook form is known as the Ishida. In contrast, the seventh file pawn (Black) or the third file pawn (White) is pushed up to the fifth rank. This gives an option for the Ishida Third File Rook player's rook to be positioned on the 76 square (Black) or the 34 square (White).

Furthermore, Third File Rook positions can be categorized according to whether the bishop's diagonal is open or closed. In normal Third File Rook and normal Ishida Third File Rook openings, the bishop's diagonal is closed. The Quick Ishida is an aggressive variant of the Ishida opening in which the bishop's diagonal is kept open, allowing for a bishop exchange at an opportune moment.

=== Normal Third File Rook ===
Third File Rook (Black)
☖ pieces in hand: –

9	8	7	6	5	4	3	2	1
									1
									2
									3
									4
									5
		歩	歩						6
歩	歩	角		歩	歩	歩	歩	歩	7
		飛	銀		玉				8
香	桂		金		金	銀	桂	香	9

☗ pieces in hand: –
Third File Rook (White)
☗ pieces in hand: –

1	2	3	4	5	6	7	8	9
香	桂	銀	金		金		桂	香	9
		玉			銀	飛			8
歩	歩	歩	歩	歩		角	歩	歩	7
					歩	歩			6
									5
									4
									3
									2
									1

☖ pieces in hand: –

Normal Third File
☖ pieces in hand: –

9	8	7	6	5	4	3	2	1
香	桂	銀	金	王	金	銀	桂	香	1
						飛	角		2
歩	歩	歩	歩	歩			歩	歩	3
					歩	歩			4
									5
		歩					歩		6
歩	歩		歩	歩	歩	歩		歩	7
	角				銀		飛		8
香	桂	銀	金	玉	金		桂	香	9

☗ pieces in hand: –
6. R-32
Normal Third File
☖ pieces in hand: –

9	8	7	6	5	4	3	2	1
香	桂	銀	金	王	金	銀	桂	香	1
						飛	角		2
歩	歩	歩	歩	歩			歩	歩	3
					歩	歩			4
							歩		5
		歩							6
歩	歩		歩	歩	歩	歩		歩	7
	角				銀		飛		8
香	桂	銀	金	玉	金		桂	香	9

☗ pieces in hand: –
7. P-25

6. R-32. White shows its intention to play Third File Rook.

7. P-25. Advancing the rook's pawn to the fifth rank is an important move if Black wants to prevent White from forming an Ishida formation and thus limiting White's range of possible attacking strategies. After the pawn push, White must protect the 24 square with the bishop in order to prevent the pawn exchange.

If Black makes a different move (such as 7. S-48), then White will likely aim for the Ishida structure by advancing the third file pawn and then moving the rook up to the fourth rank. The elevated rook can then defend the fourth rank and prevent Black from making a pawn exchange on the second file.

Normal Third File
☖ pieces in hand: –

9	8	7	6	5	4	3	2	1
香	桂	銀	金	王	金	銀	桂	香	1
						飛			2
歩	歩	歩	歩	歩		角	歩	歩	3
					歩	歩			4
							歩		5
		歩							6
歩	歩		歩	歩	歩	歩		歩	7
	角				銀		飛		8
香	桂	銀	金	玉	金		桂	香	9

☗ pieces in hand: –
8. B-33
Normal Third File
☖ pieces in hand: –

9	8	7	6	5	4	3	2	1
香	桂	銀	金	王	金		桂	香	1
					銀	飛			2
歩	歩	歩	歩	歩		角	歩	歩	3
					歩	歩			4
							歩		5
		歩							6
歩	歩		歩	歩	歩	歩		歩	7
	角		玉		銀		飛		8
香	桂	銀	金		金		桂	香	9

☗ pieces in hand: –
9. K-68 10. S-42

8. B-33. White uses the bishop to protect the second file.

Normal Third File
☖ pieces in hand: –

9	8	7	6	5	4	3	2	1
香	桂	銀	金		金		桂	香	1
			王		銀	飛			2
歩	歩	歩	歩	歩		角	歩	歩	3
					歩	歩			4
							歩		5
		歩							6
歩	歩		歩	歩	歩	歩		歩	7
	角	玉			銀		飛		8
香	桂	銀	金		金		桂	香	9

☗ pieces in hand: –
11. K-78 12. K-62
Normal Third File
☖ pieces in hand: –

9	8	7	6	5	4	3	2	1
香	桂	銀	金		金		桂	香	1
		王			銀	飛			2
歩	歩	歩	歩	歩		角	歩	歩	3
					歩	歩			4
							歩		5
		歩		歩					6
歩	歩		歩		歩	歩		歩	7
	角	玉		金	銀		飛		8
香	桂	銀	金				桂	香	9

☗ pieces in hand: –
13. P-56 14. K-72
15. G49-58

Normal Third File
☖ pieces in hand: –

9	8	7	6	5	4	3	2	1
香	桂	銀	金		金		桂	香	1
		王			銀	飛			2
歩	歩	歩	歩			角	歩	歩	3
				歩	歩	歩			4
							歩		5
		歩		歩					6
歩	歩		歩		歩	歩		歩	7
	角	玉		金	銀		飛		8
香	桂	銀	金				桂	香	9

☗ pieces in hand: –
16. P-54
Normal Third File
☖ pieces in hand: –

9	8	7	6	5	4	3	2	1
香	桂	銀	金		金		桂	香	1
		王			銀	飛			2
	歩	歩	歩			角	歩	歩	3
歩				歩	歩	歩			4
							歩		5
歩		歩		歩					6
	歩		歩		歩	歩		歩	7
	角	玉		金	銀		飛		8
香	桂	銀	金				桂	香	9

☗ pieces in hand: –
17. P-96 18. P-94

Normal Third File
☖ pieces in hand: –

9	8	7	6	5	4	3	2	1
香	桂	銀	金				桂	香	1
		王		金	銀	飛			2
	歩	歩	歩			角	歩	歩	3
歩				歩	歩	歩			4
							歩		5
歩		歩		歩		歩			6
	歩		歩		歩			歩	7
	角	玉		金	銀		飛		8
香	桂	銀	金				桂	香	9

☗ pieces in hand: –
19. P-36 20. G41-52
Normal Third File
☖ pieces in hand: –

9	8	7	6	5	4	3	2	1
香	桂	銀	金				桂	香	1
	王			金	銀	飛			2
	歩	歩	歩			角	歩	歩	3
歩				歩	歩	歩			4
							歩		5
歩		歩		歩	歩	歩			6
	歩		歩					歩	7
	角	玉		金	銀		飛		8
香	桂	銀	金				桂	香	9

☗ pieces in hand: –
21. P-46 22. K-82

==== Kōyan ====
Kōyan Example 1
☖ pieces in hand: –

9	8	7	6	5	4	3	2	1
香			金		金		桂	王	1
	飛				角		銀	香	2
歩		桂	歩		歩		歩	歩	3
		歩		歩	銀	歩			4
	歩		歩						5
		歩		歩	歩	歩			6
歩	歩	角		銀	金	桂	歩	歩	7
		飛				銀	玉		8
香	桂				金			香	9

☗ pieces in hand: –
Kōyan Example 2
☖ pieces in hand: –

9	8	7	6	5	4	3	2	1
香	桂					金	桂	王	1
	飛			金			銀	香	2
歩			歩		歩	角	歩	歩	3
		歩	銀	歩		歩			4
	歩				歩				5
		歩	歩	歩	銀	歩		歩	6
歩	歩	角			金		歩		7
		飛				銀	玉		8
香	桂				金		桂	香	9

☗ pieces in hand: –

The Kōyan variation (コーヤン流 kōyan-ryū) of Third File Rook is named after the nickname, コーヤン kōyan, of professional player Isao Nakata who invented the strategy.

It is often said that the Bear-in-the-hole Static Rook is a natural enemy of Third File Rook Ranging Rook openings. Traditionally, the side playing Ranging Rook would go for a Mino castle with an eye towards an attacking race, often resulting in the Bear-in-the-hole Static Rook surviving thanks to its solidity and distance.

Of course, other Ranging Rook strategies had been in decline due to the Bear-in-the-hole, but for Fourth File Rook strategies the Fujii System was developed as a countermeasure against Bear-in-the-hole Static Rook. In Third File Rook strategies, however, no countermeasure had appeared, and even the countermeasures of the Fujii System against the Bear-in-the-hole had begun to be adopted.

It was at that point that Nakata, whose specialty is Third File Rook, caused a stir. This set of strategies is designed to dismantle a Bear-in-the-hole castle of a Static Rook player as well as being able to withstand Static Rook rapid attack strategies. It involves a number of strategies including the Isao Nakata XP.

===== Isao Nakata XP =====
Isao Nakata XP
☖ pieces in hand: –

9	8	7	6	5	4	3	2	1
香	桂					金	桂	王	1
	飛			金			銀	香	2
歩			歩	銀		角	歩	歩	3
		歩		歩	歩	歩			4
	歩							歩	5
		歩	歩	歩	歩	歩			6
歩	歩	角		銀	金	桂	歩		7
		飛			玉	銀			8
香	桂				金			香	9

☗ pieces in hand: –

The Isao Nakata XP (中田功XP) has gained attention as way of playing against Bear-in-the-hole Static Rook. It was created by Nakata (also known as Kōyan), and then introduced and popularized in Akira Shima's famous book on Ranging Rook strategy. It was Shima in this same book who gave it the "XP" name, taken from the fact that Microsoft Windows XP was the latest version of Windows at that time.

The main idea is to leave the Mino castle incomplete, with the king stopping at 48 before moving to 39 (or at 62 in the case of White), breaking down the Bear-in-the-hole castle by the dual use of an edge attack and the power of the bishop. The reason for not bringing the king into the Mino is to reduce the number of moves needed to build the castle and prepare for a fast attack and, most importantly, to keep the king away from the backlash that will occur as a result of the edge attack.

=== Third file pawn push forms (☖P-35 ☗P-75) ===
There are two Third File Rook formations with an early pawn push on the third file to the fifth rank (or the seventh file if Third File Rook is played by Black). The most popular form is the Ishida formation in which the pushed pawn is defended directly by the rook. There are two Ishida variations, the Real Ishida and Quick Ishida. The other form is a slow game variation in which the pushed pawn is instead defended by a developed left silver.

==== ☗P-75 ☗S-76 (Non-Ishida) ====
☗P-75 ☗S-76
☖ pieces in hand: –

9	8	7	6	5	4	3	2	1
香	桂				金	銀	桂	香	1
	飛			金		王	角		2
歩		歩	銀	歩	歩		歩	歩	3
			歩			歩			4
	歩	歩							5
		銀	歩						6
歩	歩	角		歩	歩	歩	歩	歩	7
		飛				玉			8
香	桂		金		金	銀	桂	香	9

☗ pieces in hand: –
☗P-75 ☗S-76
☖ pieces in hand: 歩

9	8	7	6	5	4	3	2	1
香	桂				金	銀	桂	香	1
				金		王	角		2
			銀	歩	歩		歩		3
歩	飛		歩			歩		歩	4
	歩	歩							5
		銀	歩					歩	6
歩	歩	角		歩	歩	歩	歩		7
		飛				銀	玉		8
香	桂		金		金		桂	香	9

☗ pieces in hand: –

Here the seventh file pawn is pushed to the 75 square early in the opening. It is a slow game as the Third Rook player has closed the bishop's diagonal with P-66. Instead of the more common Ishida formation, this variation uses the left silver to support the advanced pawn on the seventh file. Yasuharu Ōyama used this opening a number of times in the 1970s. In the mid-1970s, this opening was already considered an old style of playing.

Example game: Kunio Yonenaga vs Makoto Nakahara November 1976

==== Ishida ====
Real Ishida (Third File Rook)
☖ pieces in hand: –

9	8	7	6	5	4	3	2	1
									1
									2
									3
									4
		歩							5
歩		飛	歩	銀				歩	6
角	歩	桂		歩	歩	歩	歩		7
				金		銀	玉		8
香					金		桂	香	9

☗ pieces in hand: –
(with Mino castle)

Also known as the Real Ishida or Ishida Plenary Formation, the Third File Rook Ishida openings (石田流 Ishida ryu) are named after the 17th century shogi master Kengyo Ishida. A type of Third File Rook, this opening has many variations characterized by pushing the pawn to 75 (or to 35 in the case of White) so that the rook can be moved to a high position.

===== Quick Ishida =====
Quick Ishida
☖ pieces in hand: –

9	8	7	6	5	4	3	2	1
香	桂	銀	金	王	金	銀	桂	香	1
	飛						角		2
歩		歩	歩	歩	歩		歩	歩	3
						歩			4
	歩	歩							5
									6
歩	歩		歩	歩	歩	歩	歩	歩	7
	角	飛			玉				8
香	桂	銀	金		金	銀	桂	香	9

☗ pieces in hand: –

The Quick Ishida (早石田 haya Ishida) is a Third File Rook opening characterized by an early advance of Black's seventh file pawn (or White's third file pawn).

The Quick Ishida is related to the slow variant of the Ishida in that in both openings the seventh-file pawn is advanced to the fifth rank.

The strategy initially has White aiming to attack Black's bishop head and Black aiming to break White's camp on the seventh file with the threat of several different bishop drops.

The Quick Ishida position can lead to a number of traps if the opponent does not defend properly.

== See also ==
- Quick Ishida
- Ranging Rook
- Shogi opening

== Bibliography ==
- Hosking, Tony (1996). The art of shogi. The Shogi Foundation. ISBN 978-0-95310-890-9.
- Kiriyama, Kiyozumi (1979). "The counter third-file rook opening (tai-sangenbisha)". Shogi (21). Translated by Fairbairn, John: 13–16.
- Kitao, Madoka (2011). Joseki at a glance. Translated by Kawasaki, Tomohide. Nekomado. ISBN 978-4-9052-2501-0.
- Kitao, Madoka (2013). Sabaki at a glance. Translated by Kawasaki, Tomohide. Nekomado. ISBN 978-4-9052-2510-2.
- Ōuchi, Nobuyuki (1979). "The third file rook". Shogi (20). Translated by Fairbairn, John: 4–7.
- タップダイス [Taps Dies] (2017). 三間飛車ＶＳ超急戦. TOKIDA.
- Townhill, Glyndon (1976). "Championship games No. 2". Shogi (2): 12–15.
