= Ponpon Knight =

Shogi strategy

Ponpon Knight
☖ pieces in hand: –

9	8	7	6	5	4	3	2	1
香	桂		金				桂	香	1
	王	銀		金	飛				2
	歩	歩			銀	角	歩	歩	3
歩			歩	歩	歩	歩			4
					桂		歩		5
歩		歩		歩		歩		歩	6
	歩		歩	銀	歩				7
	角	玉		金	銀		飛		8
香	桂		金					香	9

☗ pieces in hand: –

Ponpon Knight (ポンポン桂 or ぽんぽん桂 ponpon kei) is a surprise Static Rook attack position used against a Ranging Rook opponent.

The ponpon in the name is an onomatopoeia (mimetic) sound effect of the Static Rook player's right knight jumping twice to start an early attack.

The position was originally used against a Fourth File Rook opponent. However, a more recent variation was developed to counter a Cheerful Central Rook opponent.

The strategy is not used by professional shogi players but can be found in amateur shogi.

== Original Normal Fourth File Rook variation ==
=== Development ===
Left S-57 Rapid Attack
☖ pieces in hand: –

9	8	7	6	5	4	3	2	1
香	桂		金				桂	香	1
	王	銀		金	飛	銀			2
	歩	歩	歩	歩		角	歩	歩	3
歩					歩	歩			4
							歩		5
歩		歩		歩		歩			6
	歩		歩	銀	歩			歩	7
	角	玉		金	銀		飛		8
香	桂		金				桂	香	9

☗ pieces in hand: –

The Ponpon Knight formation is a development from the standard Left S-57 Rapid Attack position opposing a Fourth File Rook–Mino castle position. (See Left Silver-57 Rapid Attack for the development of this preceding position.)

Development
☖ pieces in hand: –

9	8	7	6	5	4	3	2	1
香	桂		金				桂	香	1
	王	銀		金	飛	銀			2
	歩	歩	歩			角	歩	歩	3
歩				歩	歩	歩			4
							歩		5
歩		歩		歩		歩		歩	6
	歩		歩	銀	歩				7
	角	玉		金	銀		飛		8
香	桂		金				桂	香	9

☗ pieces in hand: –
First 'Pon' Hop
☖ pieces in hand: –

9	8	7	6	5	4	3	2	1
香	桂		金				桂	香	1
	王	銀		金	飛	銀			2
	歩	歩	歩			角	歩	歩	3
歩				歩	歩	歩			4
							歩		5
歩		歩		歩		歩		歩	6
	歩		歩	銀	歩	桂			7
	角	玉		金	銀		飛		8
香	桂		金					香	9

☗ pieces in hand: –
Second 'Pon' Hop
☖ pieces in hand: –

9	8	7	6	5	4	3	2	1
香	桂		金				桂	香	1
	王	銀		金	飛	銀			2
	歩	歩				角	歩	歩	3
歩			歩	歩	歩	歩			4
					桂		歩		5
歩		歩		歩		歩		歩	6
	歩		歩	銀	歩				7
	角	玉		金	銀		飛		8
香	桂		金					香	9

☗ pieces in hand: –

== Counter-Cheerful Central Rook variation ==
Counter-Cheerful Central Rook
☖ pieces in hand: –

9	8	7	6	5	4	3	2	1
香	桂	銀	金	王	金		桂	香	1
				飛	銀				2
歩	歩	歩	歩		歩	角	歩	歩	3
						歩			4
				歩			歩		5
		歩				歩		歩	6
歩	歩		歩	歩	歩				7
	角		玉		銀		飛		8
香	桂	銀	金		金		桂	香	9

☗ pieces in hand: –

== See also ==
- Static Rook

== Bibliography ==
- 将棋: B級戦法の達人. 2016. マイナビ出版.
