= Three-Pawn Sacrifice Rapid Attack =

Three-Pawn Sacrifice Rapid Attack (三歩突き捨て急戦 san-fu tsukisute kyuusen) is a fast attacking strategy in shogi. It's a Static Rook Boat Rapid Attack strategy against Black's (sente) blocking the bishop's diagonal in a Third File Rook. It was created by Hifumi Katō.

== Overview ==
Initial diagram
☖ pieces in hand: –

9	8	7	6	5	4	3	2	1
香	桂				金		桂	香	1
	飛		銀	金	銀	王	角		2
					歩		歩		3
歩		歩	歩	歩		歩		歩	4
	歩								5
		歩	歩	歩	歩			歩	6
歩	歩	角				歩	歩		7
		飛	銀	金		銀	玉		8
香	桂				金		桂	香	9

☗ pieces in hand: –
Diagram 2
☖ pieces in hand: –

9	8	7	6	5	4	3	2	1
香	桂				金		桂	香	1
	飛			金	銀	王	角		2
				銀	歩		歩		3
			歩	歩		歩		歩	4
歩		歩							5
	歩		歩	歩	歩			歩	6
		角			金	歩	歩		7
		飛	銀			銀	玉		8
香	桂				金		桂	香	9

☗ pieces in hand: – 歩 (3)
Position following the three pawn sacrifices

In this fast attack strategy the aimed move becomes evident when, in the accompanying diagram, following gote's P-94, sente defends with P-96. From P-96, it follows ...S-62-53, G-47 (although P-36 might be better if gote was aiming for a fast attack with P-45), and then, three sacrifice pushes of pawns with P-86, Px86 (since Bx86, will be followed by Bx66, S-77, B-2b, and gote is better), P-95, Px95, and, P-75, Px75 (Diagram 2), which, if taken by sente will leave gote in a better position following Lx95, Lx95, P*76, B-99, Rx86. After that, R-88, Rx88+, Bx88, R*87 is a possibility.

== See also ==
- Static Rook

== Bibliography ==
- 青野, 照市 [Teruichi Aono] (1988). 先手三間飛車破り―急戦で仕掛ける攻略法を徹底解説 [Destroying Third File Rook: A Thorough Explanation of How to Invade with Rapid Attacks]. Sougensha. ISBN 978-4422750361.
