= Kamaitachi opening =

Shogi opening

Kamaitachi
☖ pieces in hand: –

9	8	7	6	5	4	3	2	1
									1
									2
									3
									4
									5
		歩		歩					6
歩	歩		歩		歩	歩	歩	歩	7
	角				銀		飛		8
香	桂	銀	金	玉	金		桂	香	9

☗ pieces in hand: –

In shogi, the Kamaitachi opening (かまいたち戦法 kamaitachi senpou) or Eishun opening (英春流 eishun-ryuu) is an uncommon flexible opening.

It was invented by amateur shogi player Eishun Suzuki (鈴木英春). The opening can be played against Ranging Rook or Static Rook.

Kamaitachi was named after kamaitachi (鎌鼬), which is the weasel-like mythological creature associated with whirlwinds that cut humans with sickle-like painless, bloodless wounds without their knowledge.

The Kamaitachi opening is characterized by the basic formation P-56 and S-57. Typically, the first move when playing Sente (Black) is P-76, while it's S-62 when playing Gote (White). As Suzuki was training in a Zen temple he asked about a book that he should read to understand Zen, and he was given a book with the title "Only This Book." At the time, he started thinking of how in Shogi talk of "Only This Opening," was not possible and hence started working on the Kamaitachi opening.

== Kamaitachi vs Static Rook ==
Kamaitachi vs Static Rook
☖ pieces in hand: –

9	8	7	6	5	4	3	2	1
									1
									2
									3
									4
									5
		歩		歩					6
歩	歩	角	歩	銀	歩	歩	歩	歩	7
	銀	金		金			飛		8
香	桂		玉				桂	香	9

☗ pieces in hand: –

The point here is not to push the rook pawn. Rather, fortify with the left gold moving to 78, left silver to 88, and right gold to 58, and then move K-69 and B-77. When bishops are exchanged, capture with the knight (Nx77), and then move the king to K-89, push the pawn to P-66, and move the right gold to G58-67. This will resemble a Millennium castle, although the position of the right silver will be different.

== Kamaitachi vs Ranging Rook ==
Kamaitachi vs Ranging Rook
☖ pieces in hand: –

9	8	7	6	5	4	3	2	1
									1
									2
									3
									4
			銀	歩					5
		歩	銀	飛					6
歩	歩	角	歩		歩	歩	歩	歩	7
		玉	金						8
香	桂		金				桂	香	9

☗ pieces in hand: –

From its closeness to the building of a Boat castle go for a Center Vanguard Pawn. Move the right silver to S-56, and then advance it to S-65, while moving the left silver to S-66. Push the bishop to 77, and encastle with the right gold to G-68. Since it is such an elongated formation, it will interfere with the formation of the rival's castle. It is more effective against Bear-in-the-hole castles than against Mino castles.

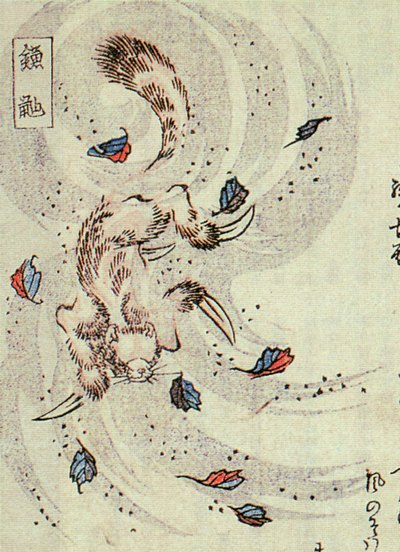
representation of a kamaitachi

== See also ==
- Shogi opening

== Bibliography ==
- 鈴木, 英春 1988 必殺!: かまいたち戦法. 三一書房.
- 鈴木, 英春 1990 必殺!: 19手定跡. 三一書房.
- 鈴木, 英春 1991 必殺!: 右四間. 三一書房.
- 鈴木, 英春 1995 英春流: 将棋問答. 三一書房.
