= Subway Rook =

Subway Rook vs
Bear-in-the-hole Fourth File Rook
☖ pieces in hand: –

9	8	7	6	5	4	3	2	1
王	桂	金					桂	香	1
香	銀	金			飛				2
歩	歩			歩	銀	角	歩	歩	3
		歩	歩		歩	歩			4
歩							歩		5
		歩	角	歩		歩		歩	6
	歩	桂	歩		歩	桂			7
香	銀	玉	金	金	銀				8
飛								香	9

☗ pieces in hand: –

Subway Rook (地下鉄飛車 chikatetsubisha) is an uncommon Static Rook shogi opening with the rook on the bottom rank 9 (or rank 1 for White) that supports an attack on the ninth file.

It may be useful against an opponent playing a Ranging Rook Bear-in-the-hole position.

The name comes from the way the rook moves from second file to the ninth file on the bottom rank as if it were an underground subway.

This bottom rank positioning of the rook is shared by a few other strategies such as the Pinwheel and Right King openings.

== Overview ==
It's an attack opening used against Bear-in-the-hole Ranging Rook and Right King. Starting with Black's moving the knight to 85, it's a powerful attack concentrated on 93 by rook, bishop, left knight and left lance. It's particularly effective against Bear-in-the-hole, since the king has no escape route and it's possible to do checkmate in one gulp. In addition, in a Double Static Rook if the rival uses Right King, it's possible to start the attack in a location close to that king.

Although boasting superb defense power, this opening requires moving almost all pieces from the 1st to the 2nd rank, which takes a lot of moves, and also makes the formation constrained. For this reason, this opening is seldom used.

== See also ==
- Shogi opening

== Bibliography ==
- 豊川孝弘著『パワーアップ戦法塾』NHK出版、2002年、ISBN 4-14-016122-1
- 塚田泰明監修、横田稔著『序盤戦! 囲いと攻めの形』、高橋書店、1997年 ISBN 4-4711-3299-7
