= Miran Nohara =

Japanese shogi player (born 2003)

- Native name: 野原未蘭
- Born: August 4, 2003 (age 21)
- Hometown: Toyama, Japan

Career
- Achieved professional status: September 1, 2020 (aged 17)
- Badge Number: W-70
- Rank: Women's 2-dan
- Teacher: Toshiyuki Moriuchi (9-dan)

Websites
- JSA profile page

Miran Nohara (野原 未蘭, Nohara Miran; born August 4, 2003) is a Japanese women's professional shogi player ranked 2-dan.

== Early life and amateur shogi ==
Nohara was born on August 4, 2003, in Toyama, Toyama. She learned how to play shogi from her father when she was five years old, and then started attending a shogi school in Kanazawa and receiving instruction from a former appentice professional 3-dan named Eishun Suzuki when she was nine years old.

As an elementary school fifth-grade student, Nohara won the 7th Elementary School Student Koma Hime Meijin Tournament in 2014, and then won the same tournament again as a sixth-grade student in 2015. After entering junior high school, Nohara won the 8th Girl's Junior High School Student Meijin Tournament in 2016 as a junior high school first year student, and then the 43rd Junior High School Student Meijin Tournament as a junior high school third-year student in 2018. Her victory in 2018 was the first time the tournament had been won by a female.

Nohara is the first to win the Women's Amateur Meijin tournament three years in a row; she won the 49th Amateur Women's Meijin Tournament in 2017, the 50th Amateur Women's Meijin Tournament in 2018 and the 51st Amateur Women's Meijin Tournament in 2019.

== Women's shogi professional ==
Nohara satisfied the criteria for the rank of women's shogi professional 2-kyū in July 2020 when she defeated Io Murota to advance to the quarterfinals of the 28th Kurashiki Tōka tournament. She informed the Japan Shogi Association of her desire to turn professional, and the JSA announced on August 14, 2020, that it had accepted her application and would award her professional status as of September 1, 2020. Since part of the process for becoming a professional means having an existing professional shogi player as a sponsor, Nohara asked Toshiyuki Moriuchi to sponsor her and he agreed.

=== Playing style ===
Nohara has stated that her favorite opening strategy is Eishunryū (英春流) or the Kamaitachi opening. It is an unorthodox strategy developed by her first shogi teacher Suzuki that can be used regardless of the opening strategy adopted by the opponent. Nohara stated that when she first started studying under Suzuki as an elementary school student she actually preferred the Bishop Exchange Fourth File Rook strategy but found that she just could not beat any opponents who were using the Kamaitachi opening; therefore, she began to study the strategy under Suzuki himself. She stated that one of the things that appealed to her about the strategy was that she could look at a random Kamaitachi position and immediately tell it was almost certainly from one of Suzuki's games in contrast to traditional shogi opening strategies which are more commonly used.

=== Promotion history ===
Nohara's promotion history is as follows:

- 2-kyū: September 1, 2020
- 1-kyū: January 18, 2021
- 1-dan: August 3, 2021
- 2-dan: December 13, 2024

Note: All ranks are women's professional ranks.
