= Super High Speed Silver-37 =

Super High Speed 37 Silver
☖ pieces in hand: –

9	8	7	6	5	4	3	2	1
香	桂	銀	金	王	金		桂	香	1
				飛	銀				2
歩	歩	歩	歩		歩	角	歩	歩	3
						歩			4
				歩			歩		5
		歩				歩			6
歩	歩		歩	歩	歩	銀		歩	7
	角		玉				飛		8
香	桂	銀	金		金		桂	香	9

☗ pieces in hand: –
Super High Speed 37 Silver (later position)
☖ pieces in hand: –

9	8	7	6	5	4	3	2	1
香	桂	銀	金		金		桂	香	1
	王			飛					2
歩	歩	歩	歩		歩	角	歩	歩	3
					銀	歩			4
				歩			歩		5
		歩	銀		銀	歩			6
歩	歩		歩	歩	歩			歩	7
	角	玉					飛		8
香	桂		金		金		桂	香	9

☗ pieces in hand: –

In shogi, Super High Speed Silver-37 or Ultra Quick Right Silver (超速3七銀 or 超速▲3七銀 chōsoku san-nana gin) is a rapid attacking formation used with a Static Rook opening by Black often against White's Cheerful Central Rook. It was developed by then-3-dan Yoshitaka Hoshino, who went on to become the second apprentice professional to win the Masuda Award in 2010.

Black aims to advance their right silver through 37 to 46. White likewise can answer Black's advancing silver by moving their left silver to 44.

== See also ==
- Static Rook
- Cheerful Central Rook

== Bibliography ==
- 2014年6月26日 第4期リコー杯女流王座戦二次予選 清水市代女流六段 対 真田彩子女流二段(16手目の棋譜コメント) - リコー杯女流王座戦棋譜中継、2014年6月26日
- Kitao, Madoka [in Japanese] (2011). Joseki at a glance. Translated by Kawasaki, Tomohide. Nekomado. ISBN 978-4-9052-2501-0.
- 杉本, 昌隆 (2016). ゴキゲン中飛車VS超速☗4六銀戦法. マイナビ出版. ISBN 978-4-8399-6076-6.
