= Central Rook vs Side Pawn =

Shogi strategy

Central Rook vs Side Pawn
☖ pieces in hand: 歩

9	8	7	6	5	4	3	2	1
香	桂	銀	金	王		銀	桂	香	1
				飛		金	角		2
歩	歩	歩	歩		歩			歩	3
						飛			4
									5
		歩		歩					6
歩	歩		歩	歩	歩	歩		歩	7
	角								8
香	桂	銀	金	玉	金	銀	桂	香	9

☗ pieces in hand: 歩歩

Central Rook vs Side Pawn is an older joseki for a Central Rook position by White played against a Static Rook position played by Black that captures White's side pawn on 34. (Cf. the Double Static Rook Side Pawn Capture opening.)

It was seen up until the 1950s-1980s but is now no longer used by professional players as the judgment of the position then appeared to strongly favor Black.

An example of this opening occurred in the meijin match between Masao Tsukada (塚田正夫) and Yoshio Kimura (木村義雄) on June 6, 1947.

== Development ==
Central Rook vs Side Pawn
☖ pieces in hand: –

9	8	7	6	5	4	3	2	1
香	桂	銀	金	王	金	銀	桂	香	1
	飛						角		2
歩	歩	歩	歩		歩		歩	歩	3
				歩		歩			4
							歩		5
		歩							6
歩	歩		歩	歩	歩	歩		歩	7
	角						飛		8
香	桂	銀	金	玉	金	銀	桂	香	9

☗ pieces in hand: –

1.	P-76	P-34
2.	P-26	P-54
3.	P-25

Central Rook vs Side Pawn
☖ pieces in hand: –

9	8	7	6	5	4	3	2	1
香	桂	銀	金	王	金	銀	桂	香	1
	飛						角		2
歩	歩	歩	歩		歩		歩	歩	3
						歩			4
				歩			歩		5
		歩							6
歩	歩		歩	歩	歩	歩		歩	7
	角						飛		8
香	桂	銀	金	玉	金	銀	桂	香	9

☗ pieces in hand: –

3.	...P-55

1. P-76 P-34, 2. P-26 P-54, 3. P-25. The opening starts with a position that with both players' bishop diagonals open looks similar to White's Cheerful Central Rook (which hadn't been invented yet). Both bishop diagonals are open, Black has chosen a Static Rook position, and White has pushed their central pawn.

3...P-55. However, on the fifth move, joseki diverges from Cheerful Central Rook. White's central pawn is pushed to the middle rank 5 closing the bishop diagonal and preventing a bishop trade.

(The Cheerful Central Rook joseki instead swings their rook to the central file (R-52).

Central Rook vs Side Pawn
☖ pieces in hand: –

9	8	7	6	5	4	3	2	1
香	桂	銀	金	王	金	銀	桂	香	1
	飛						角		2
歩	歩	歩	歩		歩		歩	歩	3
						歩	歩		4
				歩					5
		歩							6
歩	歩		歩	歩	歩	歩		歩	7
	角						飛		8
香	桂	銀	金	玉	金	銀	桂	香	9

☗ pieces in hand: –

4.	P-24

Central Rook vs Side Pawn
☖ pieces in hand: 歩

9	8	7	6	5	4	3	2	1
香	桂	銀	金	王	金	銀	桂	香	1
	飛						角		2
歩	歩	歩	歩		歩			歩	3
						歩	飛		4
				歩					5
		歩							6
歩	歩		歩	歩	歩	歩		歩	7
	角								8
香	桂	銀	金	玉	金	銀	桂	香	9

☗ pieces in hand: 歩

4.		...Px24
5.	Rx24

4. P-24 Px24, Rx24. Since the bishop diagonal is closed, Black can trade pawns on the second file.

Central Rook vs Side Pawn
☖ pieces in hand: 歩

9	8	7	6	5	4	3	2	1
香	桂	銀	金	王		銀	桂	香	1
	飛					金	角		2
歩	歩	歩	歩		歩			歩	3
						歩	飛		4
				歩					5
		歩							6
歩	歩		歩	歩	歩	歩		歩	7
	角								8
香	桂	銀	金	玉	金	銀	桂	香	9

☗ pieces in hand: 歩

5.	...	G-32

Central Rook vs Side Pawn
☖ pieces in hand: 歩

9	8	7	6	5	4	3	2	1
香	桂	銀	金	王		銀	桂	香	1
				飛		金	角		2
歩	歩	歩	歩		歩			歩	3
						飛			4
				歩					5
		歩							6
歩	歩		歩	歩	歩	歩		歩	7
	角								8
香	桂	銀	金	玉	金	銀	桂	香	9

☗ pieces in hand: 歩歩

6.	Rx34	R-52

Subsequently, Black captures White's side pawn while White swings their rook to the central file.

After Black moves their rook back to the second file, White attacks on the central file and then trades bishops.

Central Rook vs Side Pawn
☖ pieces in hand: 歩

9	8	7	6	5	4	3	2	1
香	桂	銀	金	王		銀	桂	香	1
				飛		金	角		2
歩	歩	歩	歩		歩			歩	3
							飛		4
									5
		歩		歩					6
歩	歩		歩	歩	歩	歩		歩	7
	角								8
香	桂	銀	金	玉	金	銀	桂	香	9

☗ pieces in hand: 歩歩

7.	R-24	P-56

Central Rook vs Side Pawn
☖ pieces in hand: 角 歩

9	8	7	6	5	4	3	2	1
香	桂	銀	金	王		銀	桂	香	1
				飛		金			2
歩	歩	歩	歩		歩			歩	3
							飛		4
									5
		歩		歩					6
歩	歩		歩		歩	歩		歩	7
	馬								8
香	桂	銀	金	玉	金	銀	桂	香	9

☗ pieces in hand: 歩歩歩

8.	Px56	Bx88

Central Rook vs Side Pawn
☖ pieces in hand: 歩

9	8	7	6	5	4	3	2	1
香	桂	銀	金	王		銀	桂	香	1
				飛		金			2
歩	歩	歩	歩		歩	角		歩	3
							飛		4
									5
		歩		歩					6
歩	歩		歩		歩	歩		歩	7
	銀								8
香	桂		金	玉	金	銀	桂	香	9

☗ pieces in hand: 角 歩歩歩

9.	Sx88	B*33

Central Rook vs Side Pawn
☖ pieces in hand: 銀 歩

9	8	7	6	5	4	3	2	1
香	桂	銀	金	王		銀	龍	香	1
				飛		金			2
歩	歩	歩	歩		歩			歩	3
									4
									5
		歩		歩					6
歩	歩		歩		歩	歩		歩	7
	馬								8
香	桂		金	玉	金	銀	桂	香	9

☗ pieces in hand: 角 桂 歩歩歩

10.	Rx21+	Bx88+

Side Pawn vs Central Rook
☖ pieces in hand: 銀 桂 歩

9	8	7	6	5	4	3	2	1
香	桂	銀	金	王		銀	龍	香	1
				飛		金			2
歩	歩	歩	歩		歩			歩	3
									4
									5
		歩		歩					6
歩	歩	角	歩		歩	歩		歩	7
									8
香	馬		金	玉	金	銀	桂	香	9

☗ pieces in hand: 桂 歩歩歩

11.	B*77	+Bx89

Central Rook vs Side Pawn
☖ pieces in hand: 銀 桂 歩

9	8	7	6	5	4	3	2	1
香	桂	銀	金	王		銀	龍	馬	1
				飛		金			2
歩	歩	歩	歩		歩			歩	3
									4
									5
		歩		歩					6
歩	歩		歩		歩	歩		歩	7
									8
香	馬		金	玉	金	銀	桂	香	9

☗ pieces in hand: 桂 香 歩歩歩

12.	Bx11+

Central Rook vs Side Pawn
☖ pieces in hand: 銀 歩

9	8	7	6	5	4	3	2	1
香	桂	銀	金	王		銀	龍	馬	1
				飛		金			2
歩	歩	歩	歩		歩			歩	3
									4
									5
		歩		歩					6
歩	歩		歩	桂	歩	歩		歩	7
				金					8
香	馬			玉	金	銀	桂	香	9

☗ pieces in hand: 桂 香 歩歩歩

12.		...N*57
13.	G69-G58

Central Rook vs Side Pawn
☖ pieces in hand: 銀 歩歩

9	8	7	6	5	4	3	2	1
香	桂	銀	金	王		銀	龍	馬	1
						金			2
歩	歩	歩	歩		歩			歩	3
									4
									5
		歩		飛					6
歩	歩		歩	桂	歩	歩		歩	7
			桂	金					8
香	馬			玉	金	銀	桂	香	9

☗ pieces in hand: 香 歩歩歩

13.		...Rx56
14.	N*68

== See also ==
- Central Rook
- Side Pawn Capture
- Static Rook

== Bibliography ==
- Hosking, Tony (1996). The art of shogi. The Shogi Foundation. ISBN 978-0-95310-890-9.
- 柿沼, 昭治 (1979). shōgi ni tsuyoku naru hon 将棋に強くなる本 [a book to make you stronger at shogi] (in Japanese). 金園社 [Kin-ensha]. pp. 25–27. ISBN 978-4321-55222-6.
