= Side Pawn Capture, Pawn*23 =

Side Pawn Capture
P*23 Variation
☖ pieces in hand: –

9	8	7	6	5	4	3	2	1
香	桂	銀	金	王		銀	桂	香	1
	飛					金	角		2
歩		歩	歩	歩	歩		歩	歩	3
						飛			4
	歩								5
		歩							6
歩	歩		歩	歩	歩	歩		歩	7
	角	金							8
香	桂	銀		玉	金	銀	桂	香	9

☗ pieces in hand: 歩歩

Side Pawn Capture Pawn*23 (横歩取り☖2三歩 yokofudori ni-san fu) or Side Pawn Capture B*25 (横歩取り☖2五角 yokofudori ni-go kaku) is variation stemming from the Side Pawn Capture opening, in which White drops a pawn on the second file before trading off pawns on the eighth file leading Black to capture White's Side Pawn. After this, White initiates a rapid attack against Black's rook starting from a bishop drop on the second file.

This is an older variation of the Side Pawn opening that has become disfavored since White's rapid attack is considered ineffective.

== Development ==
☖ P*23
up to move 12
☖ pieces in hand: –

9	8	7	6	5	4	3	2	1
香	桂	銀	金	王		銀	桂	香	1
	飛					金	角		2
歩		歩	歩	歩	歩		歩	歩	3
						歩	飛		4
	歩								5
		歩							6
歩	歩		歩	歩	歩	歩		歩	7
	角	金							8
香	桂	銀		玉	金	銀	桂	香	9

☗ pieces in hand: 歩
6... P*23
☖ P*23
up to move 13
☖ pieces in hand: –

9	8	7	6	5	4	3	2	1
香	桂	銀	金	王		銀	桂	香	1
	飛					金	角		2
歩		歩	歩	歩	歩		歩	歩	3
						飛			4
	歩								5
		歩							6
歩	歩		歩	歩	歩	歩		歩	7
	角	金							8
香	桂	銀		玉	金	銀	桂	香	9

☗ pieces in hand: 歩歩

6...P*23. White drops their pawn in hand on the 23 square attacking Black's rook – a striking pawn tactic.

7. Rx34. Fleeing from attack, Black can now take White's side pawn.

=== Rapid Attack ===
White's primary response to Black's capturing of the side pawn has been to immediately trade bishops and attack Black's vulnerable rook.

== See also ==
- Side Pawn Capture
- Static Rook

== Bibliography ==
- Hosking, Tony (1996). The art of shogi. The Shogi Foundation. ISBN 978-0-95310-890-9.
- 吉田, 正和 (2015). 決定版！: 横歩取り完全ガイド. マイナビ出版.
