= Center Vanguard Pawn =

Center Vanguard Pawn vs Fourth File Rook
☖ pieces in hand: –

9	8	7	6	5	4	3	2	1
香	桂		金				桂	香	1
	王	銀			飛				2
	歩	歩	金	歩	銀	角	歩	歩	3
歩			歩		歩	歩			4
				歩			歩		5
歩		歩	歩	銀					6
	歩				歩	歩		歩	7
	角	玉	銀	金			飛		8
香	桂		金				桂	香	9

☗ pieces in hand: –

In shogi, Center Vanguard Pawn (5筋位取り go-suji kuraidori or 中央位取り chūō kuraidori) is a Static Rook opening used against a Ranging Rook opponent.

The term vanguard pawn (位取り kuraidori) refers to a positioning of a pawn advanced to the middle rank supported by generals as a phalanx-like attacking formation.

This vanguard pawn is positioned up to the middle rank on the central (fifth) file.

== See also ==
- King's Head Vanguard Pawn

== Bibliography ==
- Hosking, Tony (1996). The art of shogi. The Shogi Foundation. ISBN 978-0-95310-890-9.
- Kiriyama, Kiyozumi (1980). "The counter fourth-file rook opening (centre-vanguard-pawn)". Shogi (24). Translated by Fairbairn, John: 6–9.
