= Sleeve Rook =

One of the strategies of shogi

Sleeve Rook
☖ pieces in hand: –

| 9 | 8 | 7 | 6 | 5 | 4 | 3 | 2 | 1 |
| 香 | 桂 | 銀 | 金 | 王 | 金 | 銀 | 桂 | 香 | 1 |
| | 飛 | | | | | | 角 | | 2 |
| 歩 | 歩 | 歩 | 歩 | 歩 | 歩 | | 歩 | 歩 | 3 |
| | | | | | | 歩 | | | 4 |
| | | | | | | | | | 5 |
| | | | | | | 歩 | | | 6 |
| 歩 | 歩 | 歩 | 歩 | 歩 | 歩 | | 歩 | 歩 | 7 |
| | 角 | | | | | 飛 | | | 8 |
| 香 | 桂 | 銀 | 金 | 玉 | 金 | 銀 | 桂 | 香 | 9 |

☗ pieces in hand: –

In shogi, Sleeve Rook (袖飛車 sodebisha, also translated as Right Third File Rook, Sideways Rook or Sidestepped Rook) is a Static Rook opening in which the rook is moved to the third file if played by Black or the seventh file if played by White.

Aside from being its own opening, a Sleeve Rook formation is used in some variations of several different openings. For instance, there are Sleeve Rook variations of the Double Fortress and of different Static Rook vs Ranging Rook openings.

== History ==
Hon'inbō vs Ōhashi 1614
position after 28 moves
☖ pieces in hand: –

| 9 | 8 | 7 | 6 | 5 | 4 | 3 | 2 | 1 |
| 香 | | | 金 | 王 | 金 | | 桂 | 香 | 1 |
| | 飛 | | | | | | 角 | | 2 |
| | | 桂 | | 銀 | 銀 | | 歩 | | 3 |
| 歩 | | 歩 | 歩 | 歩 | 歩 | 歩 | | 歩 | 4 |
| | 歩 | | | | | | | | 5 |
| 歩 | | 歩 | 銀 | 歩 | 歩 | 歩 | | 歩 | 6 |
| | 歩 | 角 | 歩 | | 銀 | | 歩 | | 7 |
| | | 金 | | | | 飛 | | | 8 |
| 香 | 桂 | | | 玉 | 金 | | 桂 | 香 | 9 |

☗ pieces in hand: –

The Sleeve Rook opening is one of the oldest shogi openings appearing around the same time as the Black's Static Rook vs White's Traditional Ranging Rook type of openings and the Wrong Diagonal Bishop (thus predating other old openings such as Fortress, etc).

The adjacent diagram shows a game from 1614 between Sansa Hon'inbō (Black) and Sōkei Ōhashi I (White), the first Meijin. Hon'inbō is playing a Sleeve Rook position against Ōhashi's Static Rook.

== See also ==
- Static Rook

== Bibliography ==
- Hosking, Tony (1996). The art of shogi. The Shogi Foundation. ISBN 978-0-95310-890-9.
