= Right King =

Bishop Exchange Right King
☖ pieces in hand: –

9	8	7	6	5	4	3	2	1
									1
									2
									3
									4
							歩		5
歩		歩		歩	歩	歩		歩	6
	歩		歩	銀	銀	桂			7
		金		金		玉			8
香	桂						飛	香	9

☗ pieces in hand: 角

In shogi, Right King or Right-hand King (右玉 migi gyoku) is a defensive subcomponent of different openings in which the king stays on the right side of the board together with the rook, which protects the back rank (rank 9) as well as the eighth file. It is an exception to the general rule that the king is castled away from the rook.

It is possible to use a Right King formation within a Bishop Exchange opening as well as other openings.

The castle formation used in these strategies is also called a Right King castle.

== Overview ==
Right King Variant
☖ pieces in hand: –

9	8	7	6	5	4	3	2	1
									1
									2
									3
									4
							歩		5
歩		歩		歩	歩	歩		歩	6
	歩	銀	金		銀	桂			7
		金	角			玉			8
香	桂						飛	香	9

☗ pieces in hand: –
Kimura vs Habu 2016
☖ pieces in hand: 角 歩

9	8	7	6	5	4	3	2	1
香	飛						桂	香	1
		王	金			金			2
		桂	銀	銀			歩		3
歩		歩	歩	歩		歩		歩	4
	歩				歩		歩		5
歩		歩	歩	歩	角	歩		歩	6
	歩	銀	金		銀	桂			7
		金					飛		8
香	桂	玉						香	9

☗ pieces in hand: –

When facing an opponent developing a Static Rook formation, castling the king to the left generally requires defending against attacks from above. By contrast, placing the king on the right side—farther from the opponent's main line of attack—can reduce the effectiveness of such offensives. In conventional variations where a castle is constructed on the left flank, the opponent typically assumes that the king will also castle there and therefore concentrates attacking resources on that side. In this sense, adopting a Right King formation serves as an effective way to exploit and counter that expectation.

At first glance, this may appear to contradict the maxim of "Don't place the king and the rook close to each other." However, so long as there are no exploitable gaps for piece drops and sufficient counterplay can be generated, the Right King structure can be considered well balanced. For example, if the opponent attacks from the left flank with moves such as P-45 and P-24, the defender may initiate a counterattack against the enemy's king head using the rook, bishop, and knight in coordination. In some variations, the rook may also swing across the board in preparation for counterplay against attacks originating from the left flank.

Yoshiharu Habu adopted this strategy in his seventh game in the title match of the Ōi tournament, playing white (gote), in September 12 and 13, 2016. Although Habu had initially moved his king leftwards to the 42 square earlier in the game, he later moved his king rightwards (K-52, K-61, K-72) to form a Right King position. Additionally, his left silver that was earlier on the 33 square has moved after a pawn trade on the fourth file to the 53 square (via S-44) further strengthening the Right King castle.

On the other hand, there are countermeasures for Right King, among the most notorious of which are Feint Ranging Rook and Subway Rook, or Chikara Akutsu's switching from a Floating Chrysanthemum Fortress to a Silver Crown.

== Against Ranging Rook ==
=== Itodani's Right King ===
It was developed by Tetsurō Itodani. It can be used against Ranging Rook openings (especially against Cheerful Central Rook). The king itself defends the center, while the rook uses the left side to attack on Ranging Rook's king's head.

== See also ==
- Bishop Exchange
- Castle (shogi)

== Bibliography ==
- 阿久津主税 必ず役立つプロの常識 （2009年12月、毎日コミュニケーションズ、ISBN 9784839934170）
- 塚田泰明監修、横田稔著『序盤戦! 囲いと攻めの形』、高橋書店、1997年
- 豊川孝弘著、『パワーアップ戦法塾』NHK出版、2002年、ISBN 4-14-016122-1
- Kitao, Madoka (2012). Edge attack at a glance. Translated by Kawasaki, Tomohide. Nekomado. ISBN 978-4-9052-2502-7.
