= Bear-in-the-hole castle =

Castle used in shogi

Bear-in-the-hole Castle
☖ pieces in hand: –

9	8	7	6	5	4	3	2	1
									1
									2
									3
									4
									5
									6
					歩	歩	歩	歩	7
						金	銀	香	8
						金	桂	玉	9

☗ pieces in hand: –

The Bear-in-the-hole or Anaguma castle (穴熊 anaguma, badger, lit. "hole-bear") is a castle used in shogi. (An anaguma is a Japanese badger.) It is commonly used in professional shogi.

== History ==
The Bear-in-the-hole was initially a castle used by Ranging Rook players, though in modern times, it is considered a poor choice for Ranging Rook. In addition, the renaissance of Ranging Rook strategies that was happening in the first part of the 20th century was in part attributed to the strength of the Mino castle. However, a Static Rook strategy – the King's Head Vanguard Pawn – became a formidable challenge to Ranging Rook positions, as the Mino castle is weak against frontal attacks and the King's Head Vanguard Pawn strategy exploits these weaknesses by attacking the Mino from above. (Note: The term vanguard pawn (位取り kuraidori) refers to the positioning of a pawn advanced to the middle rank supported by generals as a phalanx-like attacking formation.) Therefore, a change from a Mino to a Bear-in-the-hole was considered since the Ranging Rook player's king is moved one rank further away from the vanguard pawn offense.

Harada's Bear-in-the-hole
☖ pieces in hand: –

9	8	7	6	5	4	3	2	1
									1
									2
									3
									4
									5
	歩	歩	歩						6
歩		銀	銀						7
香		金							8
玉	桂								9

☗ pieces in hand: –
Tanaka vs Satō 1976
☖ pieces in hand: –

9	8	7	6	5	4	3	2	1
香	桂		金					香	1
	王	銀		金			角		2
歩	歩	歩	歩	歩		桂	歩		3
				銀		飛		歩	4
			歩		歩	歩	歩		5
		歩	銀	歩					6
歩	歩	角			歩	歩		歩	7
香	銀			金			飛		8
玉	桂	金					桂	香	9

☗ pieces in hand: –

The Bear-in-the-hole variant used for Static Rook positions was initially called Harada's Bear-in-the-hole (原田流穴熊 harada-ryū anagauma) named after professional player Yasuo Harada (原田泰夫) who used his own particular Bear-in-the-hole configuration.

Torahiko Tanaka helped popularize the Bear-in-the-hole castle as a castle for Counter-Ranging Rook Static Rook positions among professional players. At the time, the Bear-in-the-hole was used primarily for Ranging Rook positions. The adjacent diagram shows Tanaka (Black) using Static Rook position with an Incomplete Bear-in-the-hole castle in an October 1976 professional match. His opponent Daigorō Satō (佐藤大五郎) is using an Ishida position (developed from an earlier Fourth File Rook position). Later, Tanaka claimed to be the originator of the Static Rook Bear-in-the-hole. According to retired professional Noboru Tamaru (田丸昇), an amateur player who had used the Static Rook Bear-in-the-hole in the 1970s brought a lawsuit against Tanaka for Tanaka's alleged false claims. The court case was eventually dismissed.

Although originally considered a primarily Ranging Rook castle, the Static Rook Bear-in-the-hole became a very tough castle for Ranging Rook players to attack. However, in the mid-1990s, the Fujii System was developed for Ranging Rook that created many problems for Static Rook Bear-in-the-hole positions leading to changes in Static Rook strategies including even abandoning the Bear-in-the-hole for other castles (such as the Millennium castle) in some variations.

== Details ==
Ranging Rook Bear-in-the-hole
☖ pieces in hand: –

9	8	7	6	5	4	3	2	1
									1
									2
									3
									4
									5
									6
					歩	歩	歩	歩	7
						金	銀	香	8
						金	桂	玉	9

☗ pieces in hand: –
Static Rook Bear-in-the-hole
☖ pieces in hand: –

9	8	7	6	5	4	3	2	1
									1
									2
									3
									4
									5
		歩							6
歩	歩	角	歩						7
香	銀	金							8
玉	桂	金							9

☗ pieces in hand: –

This castle can be executed on either side of the board. A player utilizing the Ranging Rook strategy uses a Ranging Rook Bear-in-the-hole (振り飛車穴熊 furibisha anaguma) on the right side while a player employing the Static Rook strategy builds a Static Rook Bear-in-the-hole (居飛車穴熊 ibisha anaguma) on the left side. The end result will place the king in the corner square where the lance started, defended by two gold generals and one silver. This way, the King cannot be easily checked by a knight or a ranging piece.

One suggested strategy for the Ranging Rook version of the castle is the following:

1. Move the rook to its Ranging Rook file.
2. Move the king to the rook's starting square.
3. Move the lance up one square, then move the king to the lance's starting square.
4. Move the silver diagonally forward to the right.
5. Move both golds to the castle for additional defense.

When building a Static Rook Bear-in-the-hole, the bishop is moved out of the way of the king, and the seventh file pawn is moved to make space for the bishop, which may be moved elsewhere later.

G67 Variant
☖ pieces in hand: –

9	8	7	6	5	4	3	2	1
									1
									2
									3
									4
									5
		歩	歩						6
歩	歩	角	金						7
香	銀								8
玉	桂	金							9

☗ pieces in hand: –

It's also possible for a gold to be positioned at 67 instead of 78.

=== Bear-in-the-hole variants ===
Incomplete Bear-in-the-hole
☖ pieces in hand: –

9	8	7	6	5	4	3	2	1
									1
									2
									3
									4
									5
									6
					歩	歩	歩	歩	7
							銀	香	8
						金	桂	玉	9

☗ pieces in hand: –
Mino Bear-in-the-hole
☖ pieces in hand: –

9	8	7	6	5	4	3	2	1
									1
									2
									3
									4
									5
									6
					歩	歩	歩	歩	7
					金		銀	香	8
						金	桂	玉	9

☗ pieces in hand: –

Twin Gold Bear-in-the-hole (Black)
☖ pieces in hand: –

9	8	7	6	5	4	3	2	1
									1
									2
									3
									4
									5
									6
					歩	歩	歩	歩	7
					金	金	銀	香	8
							桂	玉	9

☗ pieces in hand: –
High Bear-in-the-hole
☖ pieces in hand: –

9	8	7	6	5	4	3	2	1
									1
									2
									3
									4
									5
							歩	歩	6
					歩	歩	銀		7
						金	金	香	8
							桂	玉	9

☗ pieces in hand: –

Left High Bear-in-the-hole
☖ pieces in hand: –

9	8	7	6	5	4	3	2	1
									1
									2
									3
									4
									5
歩	歩	歩	歩						6
	銀	銀							7
香	金	金							8
玉	桂								9

☗ pieces in hand: –
Fortress Bear-in-the-hole
☖ pieces in hand: –

9	8	7	6	5	4	3	2	1
									1
									2
									3
									4
									5
		歩	歩	歩					6
歩	歩	銀	金						7
香		金							8
玉	桂								9

☗ pieces in hand: –

Tajiri Bear-in-the-hole
田尻穴熊
☖ pieces in hand: –

9	8	7	6	5	4	3	2	1
									1
									2
									3
									4
									5
		歩							6
歩	歩	角	歩						7
香	銀	銀							8
玉	桂	金	金						9

☗ pieces in hand: –
Silver Crown Bear-in-the-hole (Black)
銀冠穴熊
☖ pieces in hand: –

9	8	7	6	5	4	3	2	1
									1
									2
									3
									4
									5
歩	歩	歩							6
	銀	角	歩						7
香	金	金							8
玉	桂								9

☗ pieces in hand: –

Big Four
ビッグ４
☖ pieces in hand: –

9	8	7	6	5	4	3	2	1
									1
									2
									3
									4
									5
	歩	歩							6
歩	銀	銀	歩						7
香	金	金							8
玉	桂								9

☗ pieces in hand: –
Matsuo Bear-in-the-hole
松尾流穴熊
☖ pieces in hand: –

9	8	7	6	5	4	3	2	1
									1
									2
									3
									4
									5
		歩	歩						6
歩	歩		金	歩					7
香	銀	金							8
玉	桂	銀							9

☗ pieces in hand: –

Pants-Off Bear-in-the-hole (right)
パンツを脱ぐ
☖ pieces in hand: –

9	8	7	6	5	4	3	2	1
									1
									2
									3
									4
									5
		歩	歩						6
歩	歩	桂	金						7
香	銀								8
玉		金							9

☗ pieces in hand: –
Pants-Off Bear-in-the-hole (left)
パンツを脱ぐ
☖ pieces in hand: –

9	8	7	6	5	4	3	2	1
									1
									2
									3
									4
									5
					歩	歩			6
					金	桂	歩	歩	7
							銀	香	8
						金		玉	9

☗ pieces in hand: –

Kanki Static Rook Bear-in-the-hole
神吉流居飛車穴熊
☖ pieces in hand: –

9	8	7	6	5	4	3	2	1
									1
									2
									3
									4
									5
	歩	歩							6
歩	銀	角	歩						7
香	銀	金							8
玉	桂	金							9

☗ pieces in hand: –

Ranging Rook Gold Bear-in-the-hole
☖ pieces in hand: –

9	8	7	6	5	4	3	2	1
									1
									2
									3
									4
									5
									6
					歩	歩	歩	歩	7
						金	金	香	8
						銀	桂	玉	9

☗ pieces in hand: –
Static Rook Gold Bear-in-the-hole
☖ pieces in hand: –

9	8	7	6	5	4	3	2	1
									1
									2
									3
									4
									5
		歩							6
歩	歩	角	歩						7
香	金	金							8
玉	桂	銀							9

☗ pieces in hand: –

Bishop Bear-in-the-hole
☖ pieces in hand: –

9	8	7	6	5	4	3	2	1
									1
									2
									3
									4
									5
									6
歩	歩	歩	歩						7
香	角	銀							8
玉	桂	銀							9

☗ pieces in hand: –

Other than the Static Rook and Ranging Rook classification, Bear-in-the-hole castles can be categorized depending upon which piece cover the square at the ear of the king. When the king is positioned at the corner square, if there were only the knight and the lance with no generals, there would be a hole diagonally in front of the king – the 88 (Black) or 22 (White) square for Ranging Rook Bear-in-the-hole and the 28 (Black) or 82 (White) squares for Static Rook Bear-in-the-hole. This square is called the diagonal hole. The piece that covers the diagonal hole names the castle. Thus, a Silver Bear-in-the-hole has a silver positioned on this square whereas a Gold Bear-in-the-hole uses a gold for this purpose (with the silver on 79 instead of the gold). (Although possible, Bishop Bear-in-the-hole are rare.)

=== Attacking Bear-in-the-hole ===
The Anaguma (Bear-in-the-hole) castle is a very compact castle that makes good use of its pieces and its corner position. Due to the pawn structures at the top of the castle, it is usually better to attack the sides of Anaguma castles. A Rook at the back row of the board places notable pressure on the bottom pieces of Anaguma Castles, and very few pieces can move without reducing the strength of the castle and allowing a strong attack.

== See also ==
- Castle (shogi)

== Bibliography ==
- Aono, Teruichi (2009) [First published in 1983]. Better Moves for Better Shogi. Translated by Fairbairn, John (2nd ed.). Ishi Press. ISBN 978-4-87187-999-6.
- Fairbairn, John (1986). Shogi for beginners (2nd ed.). Ishi Press. ISBN 978-4-8718-720-10.
- Hodges, George, ed. (1977). "Shogi castle: A source list". Shogi (9): 10–11.
- Hosking, Tony (1996). The art of shogi. The Shogi Foundation. ISBN 978-0-95310-890-9.
- Kitao, Madoka (2012). Edge attack at a glance. Translated by Kawasaki, Tomohide. Nekomado. ISBN 978-4-9052-2502-7.
- Kitao, Madoka (2014). Ending attack at a glance. Translated by Kawasaki, Tomohide. Nekomado. ISBN 978-4-9052-2513-3.
- Nishio, Akira (2014). "4th-file rook vs. static rook (1)". Shogi Openings.
- 塚田泰明監修、横田稔著『序盤戦! 囲いと攻めの形』、高橋書店、1997年 ISBN 4-4711-3299-7
- 神吉宏充. 神吉宏充の禁断の戦法 (videotape).
- Ōuchi, Nobuyuki (1978). "Opening series: How to play the Anaguma". Shogi (12). Translated by Fairbairn, John: 13–15.
