= Static Rook =

Shogi opening in which the rook does not move

Static Rook (居飛車 ibisha) openings is one of two major opening strategies in shogi. In the opening, the major piece of the rook fights from its starting position on the right side of the board (the 2nd file for Black, Sente, and the 8th file for White, Gote). In contrast, the other major opening deploys the rook to the center or left half of the board in the opening, and is known as Ranging Rook or Swinging Rook (振り飛車 furibisha).

== Summary ==
Compared with Ranging Rook, leaving the rook in its starting position on the 2nd file (8th file for Gote), or in that general area on the right side, can be a more natural idea for a strategy. Although the rook does move in strategies where it's placed on the 3rd file (7th for Gote), such as with Sleeve Rook, or on the 4th file (6th for Gote), such as with Right Fourth File Rook, these openings are still broadly classified as Static Rook, rather than Ranging. The castles mainly used in Double Static Rook games are Yagura (Fortress), Gangi (Snowroof), and Left Mino (often seen vs Ranging Rook as well). In games against Ranging Rook, rapid castles, such as boat and elmo, or sturdier castles, such as anaguma and millennium, are often used.

For a time, amateurs shied away from Static Rook, as there are many more jōseki lines to memorize when compared with the Ranging Rook, which almost always used a variant of the Mino Castle. However, entering into the 21st century, Ranging Rook has also seen a greater diversification of tactics, such as with Ranging Rook Bishop Exchange, Ranging Rook counter-attacks, and even the appearance of Double Ranging Rook, which has largely closed the gap between difficulty curves. Further, between professionals, there is less of a distinction between Static Rook and Ranging Rook players, and the number of all-rounders are growing. In recent years, the traditional view of "Static Rook Patterns" and "Ranging Rook Patterns" have been overwritten by the growing popularity of unconventional playstyles, such as right-side king, pulling the rook back to the first rank and moving it to the left-side, and so on.

== Double Static Rook ==
In Double Static Rook games (相居飛車, ai ibisha), it is common for both players to try and keep pace with their opponent as they develop their pieces during the opening, and avoid moves that would result in a disadvantage. The main lines of this kind of game can be categorized into Yagura, Bishop Exchange, Double Wing Attack, and Side Pawn Picker, but there are many variations that these could be sub-divided into. It could be said that there are actually six main lines, if the common Bishop Exchange is categorized separately from the Tempo Loss Bishop Exchange, and the Gangi castle, which has been popular in recent years, was included in its own category. To simplify, examples of the four main lines are as follows.

Strategy	Yagura	Bishop Exchange	Double Wing Attack	Side Pawn Picker
Rook File	Aim to defend with a silver general and create a yagura castle	Defend with a silver general (bishop, before the exchange)	Without defending, challenge with a mutual pawn exchange	Without defending, exchange pawns
Bishop Diagonal	Immediately open and then close with the silver general	Open and exchange bishops	Delay opening	Open and capture the pawn from the side with the rook.
Example Openings	☖ pieces in hand: -: 9 / 8 / 7 / 6 / 5 / 4 / 3 / 2 / 1; 香 / 桂 / 銀 / 金 / 王 / 金 / 銀 / 桂 / 香 / 1; / 飛 / / / / / / 角 / / 2; 歩 / / 歩 / 歩 / 歩 / 歩 / / 歩 / 歩 / 3; / 歩 / / / / / 歩 / / / 4; / / / / / / / / / 5; / / 歩 / / / / / / / 6; 歩 / 歩 / 銀 / 歩 / 歩 / 歩 / 歩 / 歩 / 歩 / 7; / 角 / / / / / / 飛 / / 8; 香 / 桂 / / 金 / 玉 / 金 / 銀 / 桂 / 香 / 9; ☗ pieces in hand: -	☖ pieces in hand: 角: 9 / 8 / 7 / 6 / 5 / 4 / 3 / 2 / 1; 香 / 桂 / 銀 / 金 / 王 / / 銀 / 桂 / 香 / 1; / 飛 / / / / / 金 / / / 2; 歩 / / 歩 / 歩 / 歩 / 歩 / / 歩 / 歩 / 3; / / / / / / 歩 / / / 4; / 歩 / / / / / / / / 5; / / 歩 / / / / / 歩 / / 6; 歩 / 歩 / 銀 / 歩 / 歩 / 歩 / 歩 / / 歩 / 7; / / 金 / / / / / 飛 / / 8; 香 / 桂 / / / 玉 / 金 / 銀 / 桂 / 香 / 9; ☗ pieces in hand: 角	☖ pieces in hand: 歩: 9 / 8 / 7 / 6 / 5 / 4 / 3 / 2 / 1; 香 / 桂 / 銀 / 金 / 王 / / 銀 / 桂 / 香 / 1; / 飛 / / / / / 金 / 角 / / 2; 歩 / / 歩 / 歩 / 歩 / 歩 / 歩 / / 歩 / 3; / / / / / / / 飛 / / 4; / 歩 / / / / / / / / 5; / / / / / / / / / 6; 歩 / 歩 / 歩 / 歩 / 歩 / 歩 / 歩 / / 歩 / 7; / 角 / 金 / / / / / / / 8; 香 / 桂 / 銀 / / 玉 / 金 / 銀 / 桂 / 香 / 9; ☗ pieces in hand: 歩	☖ pieces in hand: 歩 x2: 9 / 8 / 7 / 6 / 5 / 4 / 3 / 2 / 1; 香 / 桂 / 銀 / 金 / 王 / / 銀 / 桂 / 香 / 1; / / / / / / 金 / 角 / / 2; 歩 / / 歩 / 歩 / 歩 / 歩 / / / 歩 / 3; / / / / / / 飛 / / / 4; / / / / / / / / / 5; / 飛 / 歩 / / / / / / / 6; 歩 / / / 歩 / 歩 / 歩 / 歩 / / 歩 / 7; / 角 / 金 / / / / / / / 8; 香 / 桂 / 銀 / / 玉 / 金 / 銀 / 桂 / 香 / 9; ☗ pieces in hand: 歩 x3

From any of these positions, a variety of different tactics may develop. In a Double Static Rook opening, there is no clear advantage to Sente nor Gote, and there are strategies that can be adopted by either position.

In Yagura or Bishop Exchange, the silver and gold are lined up vertically to create a strong defense to stop the incoming rook from advancing. When playing with the yagura system it is common to build a yagura castle up on the left side and then move the king into this safer position. On the other hand, Double Wing Attack and Side Pawn Picker largely forego this defense in order to begin a rapid attack, freeing up both rooks to run around in any direction and attack from different locations. To be able to respond to these attacks, the king is normally kept near the center so that the entire camp can be quickly defended, and the Central House formation is often used.

== Against Ranging Rook ==
In games against Ranging Rook, the Static Rook side may choose to stick with a simple castle and immediately initiate a rapid attack or take the time to build up a stronger castle and play a slow game. In the case of a rapid attack, the opening will vary depending on which file the Ranging Rook side has swung their rook to. In the case of a slow game, the main focus will be less a matter of the attack and more a matter of the castle strength of either side, and the opening will be defined strictly by defensive tactics.

Rapid Attack Example
☖ pieces in hand: –

9	8	7	6	5	4	3	2	1
香	桂		金				桂	香	1
	王	銀		金	飛				2
	歩	歩	歩	歩	銀	角	歩	歩	3
歩					歩	歩			4
							歩		5
歩		歩		歩	銀	歩			6
	歩		歩		歩			歩	7
	角	玉		金	銀		飛		8
香	桂		金				桂	香	9

☗ pieces in hand: –
Slow Game Example
☖ pieces in hand: –

9	8	7	6	5	4	3	2	1
香	桂		金				桂	香	1
	王	銀					飛		2
	歩	歩	金	歩	銀	角	歩		3
歩			歩		歩	歩		歩	4
							歩		5
		歩		歩					6
歩	歩	角	歩	銀	歩	歩		歩	7
香	銀	金					飛		8
玉	桂	金					桂	香	9

☗ pieces in hand: –

Both the Static Rook and Ranging Rook sides move their kings away from their rooks to castle (Static Rook castles to the left, Ranging Rook castles to the right). In general, as the opponent's rook will be attacking from the side, both sides will build a castle shape that can withstand an attack from the side. For the Static Rook side, popular choices would be the quick but less sturdy boat castle for a rapid attack game, and the slower but sturdier anaguma for a slow game. For the Ranging Rook side, the quick and sturdy Mino castle is mainly used. Otherwise, the Static Rook player may choose to build a version of the Mino castle called Left Mino and the Ranging Rook player might build a version of anaguma, known as Ranging Rook anaguma.

== Substrategies ==
=== The Static Rook pawn push ===
Rook pawn push
☖ pieces in hand: –

9	8	7	6	5	4	3	2	1
					金	銀	桂	香	1
							角		2
				歩	歩	歩	歩	歩	3
									4
							歩		5
									6
				歩	歩	歩		歩	7
							飛		8
					金	銀	桂	香	9

☗ pieces in hand: –

One of the most prominent features of a Static Rook position is pushing the pawn directly above the rook forward. In even games, this forward marching rook pawn (飛車先 hisha saki) bears down directly on the opponent's bishop, which in the initial position is undefended.

When faced with this rook pawn push, the Static Rook's opponent must prevent this pawn from breaking through their camp by developing a piece to defend this file. In addition, the opponent must decide whether to allow the Static Rook player to exchange this rook pawn off the board or to prevent this pawn exchange from happening.

The Rook pawn exchange.

G-32.

S-32.

Preventing the Rook pawn exchange.

P-34, B-33.

P-14, B-13.

P-34, S-32/S-42, S-33

(P-34) R-22.

=== Climbing Silver ===
Climbing Silver
☖ pieces in hand: 歩

9	8	7	6	5	4	3	2	1
香	桂				王		桂	香	1
	飛		銀			金	角		2
歩			歩		金	銀	歩		3
		歩		歩	歩	歩			4
	歩						歩	銀	5
		歩		歩					6
歩	歩	銀	歩		歩	歩			7
		金		金			飛		8
香	桂	角	玉				桂	香	9

☗ pieces in hand: 歩
Climbing Silver, continued
☖ pieces in hand: 銀

9	8	7	6	5	4	3	2	1
香	桂				王		桂		1
	飛		銀			金	角	歩	2
歩			歩		金	銀	歩	歩	3
		歩		歩	歩	歩			4
	歩						歩	香	5
		歩		歩					6
歩	歩	銀	歩		歩	歩			7
		金		金			飛		8
香	桂	角	玉				桂		9

☗ pieces in hand: 香
i. ... Lx1e

ii. Lx1e P*1c

iii. P*1b ...

The Climbing Silver (棒銀 bōgin) attack involves advancing a silver upward along with an advanced or dropped pawn supported by the rook aiming to break through the opponent's camp on their bishop's side.

In the board diagram here, the Black's silver has successfully climbed to the e rank on the first file (1e).

A subsequent attack by Black, for example, could aim to sacrifice this silver in order to remove White's lance and then drop a dangling pawn within White's camp that threatens to promote.

Climbing Silver formations may be used with several different Static Rook openings such as Fortress, Double Wing, and Bishop Exchange.

Primitive Climbing Silver (原始棒銀 genshi bōgin) is a variant of Climbing Silver that attempts to use only a silver, rook, and pawn to attack. It is called primitive since such a simple strategy will not be successful if defended against properly.

=== Reclining Silver ===
Reclining Silver
up to move 24
☖ pieces in hand: 歩

9	8	7	6	5	4	3	2	1
香	桂					銀	桂	香	1
			金		王	金	角		2
歩		歩		歩	歩		歩	歩	3
	飛		歩	銀		歩			4
									5
		歩		銀	歩		飛		6
歩	歩		銀	歩		歩		歩	7
	角	金	玉	金					8
香	桂	銀					桂	香	9

☗ pieces in hand: 歩

Reclining Silver (腰掛け銀 koshikake gin) is a formation in which a player's right silver has advanced to the front of their camp on the middle 5th file and has an advanced pawn on the silver's right and pawn directly under the silver. The reclining name is meant to describe the way this silver rests on these two pawns as if it were seated on them.

In the board diagram, both Black and White have created Reclining Silver positions. Black has their silver on 5f (with pawns on 4f and 5g) while White has their silver on 5d (pawns on 5c, 6d).

Reclining Silver can often be played as a component of different Static Rook openings such as Double Wing or Bishop Exchange. (However, it can also be played in Double Ranging Rook games.)

== Static Rook Opening Strategies ==
=== Double Static Rook ===
==== Yagura (Fortress) ====
===== Double Yagura (aiyagura) =====
- N37 Yagura with S47
- Spearing the Sparrow (suzumezashi)
- S48, N37, R29
- S37 Yagura, Kato Style
- S46, N37 (Ariyoshi Style, Nada Variant)
- S36, N37 3-Move Bishop / B46
- Waki System
- Yagura Climbing Silver (bougin)
- Yagura Rushing Silver (hayakuri gin)
- Morishita System
- Quick Castle Yagura (hayagakoi)
- 4-Move Bishop (yon te kaku), Double Completed Yagura (Sennichite Yagura)
- Isomorphic Yagura (doukei)
- Silver Yagura (Reclining Silver, Sleeve Rook Variant R38)

===== Rapid Attack Yagura (kyuusen yagura) =====
- Yonenaga Style Rapid Attack Yagura (Tamaru Style, Fujimori Variant)
- Akutsu Style Rapid Attack Yagura (Nakahara Style, Goda style, Watanabe style)
- Yagura Central Rook (Central Rook Fortress)
- Right Fourth File Rook (Reclining Silver)
- Gote R62 Opening
- Primitive Climbing Silver (genshi bougin)
- Crab Silvers / Crab Golds (kani kani gin / kin)
- Ninja Silver
- Masuda Variant Rushing Silver (hayakuri gin)
- Extreme Rushing Silver (kyokugen hayakuri gin)
- Static Bishop Left Mino Rapid Attack

===== Other Variations =====
- Sente P35 Quick Attack (hayajikake)
- Gangi (Snowroof)
- Feint Ranging Rook (youdou furibisha)
- Yagura Or Bust (muriyari)

==== Bishop Exchange (kakugawari) ====
===== Reclining Silver =====
- Double Reclining Silver / Kimura Joseki
- Stagecoach Joseki (ekibasha)
- Opposed Climbing Silver (tai bougin)

===== Other Variations =====
- Rushing Silver (hayakuri gin)
- Climbing Silver (bougin)
- Wrong Diagonal Bishop (suji chigai kaku)
- Tempo Loss Bishop Exchange (Sometimes considered separate from Bishop Exchange) (gote ban ittezon kakugawari)

==== Double Wing Attack (ai gakari) ====
===== Static Rook =====
- Primitive Climbing Silver
- Climbing Silver
- Tsukada Special
- Old vs New Double Wing Attack
- Rushing Silver
- Nakahara Style (Rushing Silver Variant)
- Nakahara Rook (R56)
- Rook File Exchange Reclining Silver
- Kusarigama Silver
- UFO Silver
- Double Pawn Picker (ai yoko fudori)

===== Other Variations =====
- Twisting Rook (Rook on Pawn)

==== Side Pawn Picker ====
===== Side Pawn Picker, B33 =====
- Aerial Fight (Naito Style) (kuuchuu senpou)
- Nakahara Style
- Nakaza Rook (Side Pawn Picker Gote R85)
- R33+ Opening (Takebe Style)

===== Other Variations =====
- Side Pawn Picker, N33
- Side Pawn Picker, P*23
- Side Pawn Picker, B*45
- Double Pawn Picker (ai yoko fudori)
- Side Pawn Picker, B44

=== Static Rook vs Ranging Rook ===
==== Against Ranging Rook Generally ====
- Bishop Pullback (hiki kaku), Gangi Castle
- Static Rook Anaguma (with Bishop Pullback, Static Bishop, or Bishop Exchange)
- Left Mino (with Bishop Pullback, Static Bishop, or Bishop Exchange), Edge Mino, Skewer Cutlet
- Vanguard (with Bishop Pullback, Static Bishop, or Bishop Exchange), King's Head Vanguard, 6th (4th) File Vanguard, Center Vanguard
- Pillbox Millennium (with Bishop Pullback, Static Bishop, or Bishop Exchange), Cave Castle
- Itodani Style Right King
- Iijima Style Bishop Pullback
- Subway Rook
- Bird Catcher, Ureshino Style
- Climbing Silver, Oblique Climbing Silver (naname bougin), Left Silver-57 Rapid Attack

==== Against Central Rook ====
===== Normal Central Rook =====
- Climbing Silver, Oblique Climbing Silver
- Yamada Joseki
- Two Silver R38
- Kato Style Sleeve Rook
- G46
- Eishun Style Right 4th File Rook

===== Gokigen (Cheerful) Central Rook =====
- Central Rook vs Side Pawn
- Super Quick Attack G49-58
- Super High Speed S37
- Maruyama Vaccine
- Tonari Style
- Abe Style Edge Bishop (hashi kaku)

==== Against 4th-File Rook ====
===== Left Silver Rapid Attack =====
- Left S46 Rapid Attack
- Oblique Climbing Silver
- Semi-Express Match (S36, two silvers)
- Yamada Joseki
- P45 Quick Attack (hayasikake)
- Saginomiya Joseki
- Ponpon Knight Left Silver
- Nakahara Style Edge Bishop

===== Other Variations =====
- Right S46 Rapid Attack
- Oblique Climbing Silver
- R38
- Right 4th File Rook
- Ponpon Knight Right Silver

==== Against 3rd-File Rook ====
===== Normal 3rd-File Rook =====
- 3rd-File Rook Break Rapid Attack S46
- Quick Attack P75
- Quick Attack P45
- Two Silvers
- Three-Pawn Sacrifice Rapid Attack
- Hideharu Style Right 4th-File

===== Ishida Style 3rd-File Rook =====
- Climbing Gold
- Kimo Kimo Kin
- Two Silvers R38 (R72)

==== Against Opposing Rook ====
- S46 (Left or Right)
- G57 (Raised Gold)

== Static Rook Castles ==
Left Silver Crown Anaguma with Static Rook
☖ pieces in hand: –

9	8	7	6	5	4	3	2	1
									1
									2
									3
									4
歩							歩		5
	歩	歩	歩		銀	歩		歩	6
	銀	角		歩	歩				7
香	金	金					飛		8
玉	桂						桂	香	9

☗ pieces in hand: –

Most Static Rook openings coincide with a castle development on the player's left side of board. In the adjacent diagram is an example of a castle built on the left side of the board paired with a Static Rook position. The castle is a Left Silver Crown Anaguma (with advanced edge pawn).

Static Rook castles can be divided into two main categories: Double Static Rook castles and Counter-Ranging Rook castles. Different structures are required in these two cases since the attack patterns of the player's opponent differ. In Double Static Rook openings, a Static Rook player's king is initially threatened from above by the opponent's rook which has remained on its starting square. In Counter-Ranging Rook openings, the Static Rook king is initially threatened from the king's right side and/or obliquely from the king's right upper corner.

Castles in Double Static Rook openings have a wide variety of forms that are dependent upon the specific opening used. Some openings like Fortress and Bishop Exchange openings have the king moved leftward away from the rook in compact castles while openings like Double Wing Attack and Side Pawn Capture have rather minimal castle formations with much less king safety in a trade off of defending wider areas within the Static Rook side's camp to protect against future piece drops.

== Counter-Ranging Rook Static Rook ==
=== Iijima Bishop Pullback ===
White's Iijima Bishop Pullback
☖ pieces in hand: –

9	8	7	6	5	4	3	2	1
香	桂		金	王	金	角	桂	香	1
	飛		銀			銀			2
歩		歩	歩		歩	歩	歩	歩	3
				歩					4
	歩								5
		歩	歩	歩					6
歩	歩	角	銀		歩	歩	歩	歩	7
	飛								8
香	桂		金	玉	金	銀	桂	香	9

☗ pieces in hand: –
(against Black's Opposing Rook)

Iijima Bishop Pullback (飯島流引き角 Iijima-ryuu hiki kaku) is a Static Rook opening used against a Ranging Rook opponent.

It is characterized by not opening the bishop's diagonal and instead moving the bishop down (to 3a if played by White or 7i if played by Black) so that it can then exit one's camp via the central file.

=== Takishita's Spread Golds ===
Takishita's Spread Golds
☖ pieces in hand: –

9	8	7	6	5	4	3	2	1
香	桂		金		金		桂	香	1
	王	銀		金	飛				2
	歩	歩	歩	歩	銀	角	歩	歩	3
歩					歩	歩			4
							歩		5
歩	銀	歩					飛		6
	歩		歩	歩	歩	歩		歩	7
	角	金		玉	銀	金			8
香	桂						桂	香	9

☗ pieces in hand: –

Takishita's Spread Golds (滝下流対振り飛車金開き takishita-ryū tai furibisha kinbiraki) is a Counter-Ranging Rook trap opening that uses a Central House castle along with a Floating Rook shape. It aims for a surprise edge attack on the ninth file with support from the floating rook if the Ranging Rook opponent uses a Mino castle.

== Other types ==
=== Kurukuru Bishop ===
Kurukuru Bishop (クルクル角 kurukuru kaku) is a Static Rook opening similar to the Iijima Bishop Pullback.

It is characterized by not opening the bishop's diagonal with a pawn push and instead moving the bishop up to the player's left edge (B-9g for Black, B-1c for White). The player subsequently moves their up to the middle e rank and then down to central file (B-7e ... B-5g for Black, B-3e ... B-5c for White.) The player can then castle their king leftwards into a Left Mino.

== See also ==
- Ranging Rook
- Shogi opening
- Shogi strategy

== Bibliography ==
- Aono, Teruichi (1983). Guide to shogi openings: Unlock the secrets of joseki 将棋定跡のカギ: 和英 定跡問題集. Translated by Fairbairn, John. 山海堂. ISBN 4-381-00598-8.
- Fairbairn, John (1980). "Introduction to the static-rook". Shogi (25): 10–11.
- Fairbairn, John (1986). Shogi for beginners (2nd ed.). Ishi Press. ISBN 978-4-8718-720-10.
- Hosking, Tony (1996). The art of shogi. The Shogi Foundation. ISBN 978-0-95310-890-9.
- Kitao, Madoka (2011). Joseki at a glance. Translated by Kawasaki, Tomohide. Nekomado. ISBN 978-4-9052-2501-0.
- 湯川, 博士 [Hiroshi Yukawa] [in Japanese] (1989). 奇襲大全. マイナビ出版. ISBN 978-4-83995-787-2.
