= Fourth File Rook =

Fourth File Rook
☖ pieces in hand: –

9	8	7	6	5	4	3	2	1
									1
									2
									3
									4
									5
		歩	歩						6
歩	歩			歩	歩	歩	歩	歩	7
	角		飛						8
香	桂	銀	金	玉	金	銀	桂	香	9

☗ pieces in hand: –
Fourth File Rook
with Mino Castle
☖ pieces in hand: –

9	8	7	6	5	4	3	2	1
									1
									2
									3
									4
									5
		歩	歩					歩	6
歩	歩			歩	歩	歩	歩		7
	角		飛	金		銀	玉		8
香	桂	銀			金		桂	香	9

☗ pieces in hand: –

In shogi, Fourth File Rook (四間飛車 shikenbisha) is a class of Ranging Rook openings in which the rook is initially positioned on the fourth file if played by White or the sixth file if played by Black.

== History ==
Ōhashi vs Hon'inbō 1607
☖ pieces in hand: –

9	8	7	6	5	4	3	2	1
香	桂	銀	金	王	金		桂	香	1
					飛		角		2
歩	歩	歩	歩	歩	銀		歩	歩	3
					歩	歩			4
									5
		歩			歩	歩			6
歩	歩		歩	歩	銀		歩	歩	7
	角				飛				8
香	桂	銀	金	玉	金		桂	香	9

☗ pieces in hand: –
Ōhashi vs Hon'inbō 1607
☖ pieces in hand: –

9	8	7	6	5	4	3	2	1
香	桂		金		金		桂	香	1
		王	銀		飛				2
歩	歩	歩	歩		銀	角	歩	歩	3
				歩	歩	歩			4
									5
		歩		歩	歩	歩	歩	歩	6
歩	歩		歩		銀				7
	角	玉		金	飛				8
香	桂	銀	金				桂	香	9

☗ pieces in hand: –

The earliest recorded shogi game was a Static Rook vs. Fourth File Rook game from 1607. Black was Sōkei Ōhashi I who played a Right Fourth File Rook position (Static Rook) against Sansa Hon'inbō's Fourth File Rook. Ōhashi won the game.

== Fourth File Rook vs Static Rook ==
=== Normal Fourth File Rook ===
First 4 moves
☖ pieces in hand: –

9	8	7	6	5	4	3	2	1
香	桂	銀	金	王	金	銀	桂	香	1
	飛						角		2
歩	歩	歩	歩	歩			歩	歩	3
					歩	歩			4
									5
		歩					歩		6
歩	歩		歩	歩	歩	歩		歩	7
	角						飛		8
香	桂	銀	金	玉	金	銀	桂	香	9

☗ pieces in hand: –

The opening starts by the usual 4-move sequence that characterizes Static Rook vs Ranging Rook games as shown in the first adjacent board position. (See: Normal Ranging Rook.)

==== Fujii System ====
The Fujii System is a set of Fourth File Rook strategies used against various Static Rook strategies (mainly Left Mino and Bear-in-the-hole Static Rook).

==== vs Rapid Attack ====
Left Silver-57 Rapid Attack
☖ pieces in hand: –

9	8	7	6	5	4	3	2	1
									1
									2
									3
									4
							歩		5
歩		歩		歩		歩			6
	歩		歩	銀	歩			歩	7
	角	玉	金	金	銀		飛		8
香	桂						桂	香	9

☗ pieces in hand: –

==== Tateishi Fourth File Rook ====
A Fourth File Rook opening created by amateur player Katsuki Tateishi, which awarded him the prestigious Kōzō Masuda Award in 2004.

==== Bear-in-the-hole Fourth File Rook ====
Bear-in-the-hole Fourth File Rook
☖ pieces in hand: –

9	8	7	6	5	4	3	2	1
									1
									2
									3
			歩						4
									5
									6
歩	歩	歩		歩	歩	歩	歩	歩	7
	角	銀	飛			金	銀	香	8
香	桂					金	桂	玉	9

☗ pieces in hand: –

==== King's Head Silver ====
King's Head Silver
☖ pieces in hand: -

9	8	7	6	5	4	3	2	1
香	桂				金		桂	香	1
	飛		銀	金		王	角		2
			歩	銀	歩		歩		3
歩		歩		歩		歩		歩	4
	歩				銀				5
歩		歩	歩					歩	6
	歩	角		歩	歩	歩	歩		7
			飛			銀	玉		8
香	桂		金		金		桂	香	9

☗ pieces in hand: –

King's Head Silver (玉頭銀) is a Fourth File Rook opening characterized by the left silver moving to 56, 45, and then to 34. There are versions for both quick fights and slow games.

==== vs King's Head Vanguard Pawn ====
King's Head Vanguard Pawn
☖ pieces in hand: –

9	8	7	6	5	4	3	2	1
									1
									2
									3
									4
		歩					歩		5
		銀	歩	歩					6
歩	歩		金	銀	歩	歩		歩	7
	角	玉	金				飛		8
香	桂						桂	香	9

☗ pieces in hand: –

Fourth File Rook against Black's King's Head Vanguard Pawn (玉頭位取り gyokutou kuraidori).

==== vs Iijima Bishop Pullback ====
Iijima Bishop Pullback
☖ pieces in hand: –

9	8	7	6	5	4	3	2	1
									1
									2
									3
									4
							歩		5
歩				歩					6
	歩	歩	歩	角	歩	歩		歩	7
	玉	銀		金	銀		飛		8
香	桂		金				桂	香	9

☗ pieces in hand: –

=== Bishop-Exchange Fourth File Rook ===
The Bishop-Exchange Fourth File is a Fourth File Rook opening in which the player's bishop diagonal remains open allowing for a bishop exchange to occur early in the opening.

==== Leghorn Special ====
The Leghorn Special
☖ pieces in hand: 角

9	8	7	6	5	4	3	2	1
香	桂	銀	金		金	銀	桂	香	1
			王		飛				2
歩	歩	歩	歩	歩	歩		歩	歩	3
						歩			4
									5
		歩					歩		6
歩	歩		歩	歩	歩	歩		歩	7
	馬		玉			銀	飛		8
香	桂	銀	金		金		桂	香	9

☗ pieces in hand: –

The Leghorn Special (白色レグホン・スペシャル hakushoku reguhon supesharu or, most commonly, the abbreviation レグスペ regusupe) is an opening in which you build up a Bear-in-the-hole castle while you're simultaneously defending against an opponent's Bear-in-the-hole. It is a Bear-in-the-hole Bishop Exchange Fourth File Rook variation and is also famous as an opening to discourage Black from building of a Bear-in-the-hole. The name is said to have originated in the resemblance of this opening to the behavior of a white leghorn chicken that keeps attacking when surrounded by Bear-in-the-hole.

The leghorn special consists mainly in castling the king in Bear-in-the-hole once the bishops have been exchanged in Fourth File Rook. It requires that the opponent is playing Static Rook, and that you're playing White. Following Black's K-68, White would go for the bishop exchange (Bx88), which leads to Black's Sx88, hence reducing the escape routes of Black's king and interfering with Black's castle formation. So, the Leghorn Special prevents (or at least slows down) Black's Bear-in-the-hole, while White can devote to building its own Bear-in-the-hole without problem.

== Fourth File Rook in Double Ranging Rook ==
Fourth File Rook positions are not often used in Double Ranging Rook games in professional play. When they are used, the positions often transition to Opposing Rook positions.

== See also ==
- Left Silver-5g Rapid Attack
- Fujii System
- Right Fourth File Rook vs Fourth File Rook
- Bishop Exchange Fourth File Rook
- Tateishi Fourth File Rook
- Ranging Rook

== Bibliography ==
- Aono, Teruichi (1983). Guide to shogi openings: Unlock the secrets of joseki 将棋定跡のカギ: 和英 定跡問題集. Translated by Fairbairn, John. 山海堂. ISBN 4-381-00598-8.
- Fairbairn, John (1979). "The fourth file rook part 1". Shogi (22): 10–13.
- Fairbairn, John (1980). "The fourth file rook part 2". Shogi (23): 9–11.
- Hosking, Tony (1996). The art of shogi. The Shogi Foundation. ISBN 978-0-95310-890-9.
- Kiriyama, Kiyozumi (1980). "The counter fourth-file rook opening (centre-vanguard-pawn)". Shogi (24). Translated by Fairbairn, John: 6–9.
- Kitao, Madoka (2011). Joseki at a glance. Translated by Kawasaki, Tomohide. Nekomado. ISBN 978-4-9052-2501-0.
- Kitao, Madoka (2013). Sabaki at a glance. Translated by Kawasaki, Tomohide. Nekomado. ISBN 978-4-9052-2510-2.
- Ōuchi, Nobuyuki (1978). "Opening series: How to play the anaguma part 1". Shogi (12). Translated by Fairbairn, John: 13–15.
- Ōuchi, Nobuyuki (1978). "Opening series: How to play the anaguma part 2". Shogi (13). Translated by Fairbairn, John: 13–15.
- Ōuchi, Nobuyuki (1978). "Opening series: How to play the anaguma part 3". Shogi (14). Translated by Fairbairn, John: 12–13.
- Ōuchi, Nobuyuki (1978). "Opening series: How to play the anaguma part 4". Shogi (15). Translated by Fairbairn, John: 2.
- Yebisu, Miles (2016). Comprehensive shogi guide in English: How to play Japanese chess. Laboratory Publishing.
