= Bear-in-the-hole Static Rook =

Bear-in-the-hole Static Rook
vs
Mino Opposing Rook
☖ pieces in hand: –

9	8	7	6	5	4	3	2	1
香	桂		金				桂	香	1
	王	銀					飛		2
	歩	歩	金	歩	銀	角	歩		3
歩			歩		歩	歩		歩	4
							歩		5
		歩		歩					6
歩	歩	角	歩	銀	歩	歩		歩	7
香	銀	金					飛		8
玉	桂	金					桂	香	9

☗ pieces in hand: –

In shogi, Bear-in-the-hole Static Rook or Anaguma Static Rook (居飛車穴熊 ibisha anaguma) is a Static Rook opening that utilizes a Bear-in-the-hole castle.

It is typically played against Ranging Rook opponents.

== vs Fourth File Rook, ☖...S-44 variation ==
...S-44
☖ pieces in hand: –

9	8	7	6	5	4	3	2	1
香			金				桂	香	1
	王	銀		金	飛				2
歩	歩	桂		歩		角	歩	歩	3
		歩	歩		銀	歩			4
					歩		歩		5
		歩	歩	歩					6
歩	歩	角	金	銀	歩	歩		歩	7
香	銀						飛		8
玉	桂		金				桂	香	9

☗ pieces in hand: –
...S-44
☖ pieces in hand: –

9	8	7	6	5	4	3	2	1
香			金				桂	香	1
	王	銀			飛				2
歩	歩	桂	金			角	歩	歩	3
		歩	歩	歩	銀	歩			4
					歩		歩		5
		歩	歩	歩		歩			6
歩	歩	角	金		歩			歩	7
香	銀	金	銀				飛		8
玉	桂						桂	香	9

☗ pieces in hand: –

== See also ==
- Static Rook
- Bear-in-the-hole castle

== Bibliography ==
- Hosking, Tony (1996). The art of shogi. The Shogi Foundation. ISBN 978-0-95310-890-9.
- Kitao, Madoka (2011). Joseki at a glance. Translated by Kawasaki, Tomohide. Nekomado. ISBN 978-4-9052-2501-0.
- Kitao, Madoka (2013). Sabaki at a glance. Translated by Kawasaki, Tomohide. Nekomado. ISBN 978-4-9052-2510-2.
- Yebisu, Miles (2016). Comprehensive shogi guide in English: How to play Japanese chess. Laboratory Publishing.
- 『NHK将棋講座テキスト2011年4月号』 NHK出版 2011年
- 先崎学 『ホントに勝てる穴熊』 河出書房新社 2003年
- 遠山雄亮 『遠山流中飛車持久戦ガイド』 毎日コミュニケーションズ 2009年
- 藤井猛 『現代に生きる大山振り飛車』 日本将棋連盟 2006年
- 村田顕弘 『最新戦法マル秘定跡ファイル』 マイナビ 2012年
- 村山慈明 『ゴキゲン中飛車の急所』 浅川書房 2011年
- 渡辺明 『四間飛車破り（居飛車穴熊編）』 浅川書房 2005年
- 渡辺明 『四間飛車破り（急戦編）』 浅川書房 2005年
