= Crab Silvers =

Shogi opening

Crab Silvers
☖ pieces in hand: –

9	8	7	6	5	4	3	2	1
香	桂			王	金		桂	香	1
	飛		銀				角		2
歩		歩	歩		金	銀	歩	歩	3
				歩	歩	歩			4
	歩						歩		5
		歩		歩	銀				6
歩	歩	銀	歩		歩	歩		歩	7
	角						飛		8
香	桂		金	玉	金		桂	香	9

☗ pieces in hand: –

The Crab Silvers (カニカニ銀 kani kani gin) is a shogi opening. It is a type of Rapid Attack Fortress opening, used mostly when playing Black (sente). It is often classified as a trap opening. It was created by professional shogi player Kōichi Kodama, for which he received the prestigious Kōzō Masuda Award in 2003.

== Overview ==
Due to the large amount of freedom of the rook to enter into the game, finding ways to attack even in the middle of a Rapid Attack Fortress has quite the merit.

Unlike the Double-Silver Rapid Attack Fortress, king and gold don't move at all from their initial position (Sitting king). In the fifth movement, rather than pushing P-66, the silver is pushed to S-77. Instead of opting not to push the rook pawn from Fortress, White (gote) will play S-33 following Black's rook pawn being pushed to P-25, which will be followed by ▲S-48, ▲P-56, ▲S-57, ▲S-46. After that, if White (gote) were to push the pawn in the 5th file, the rook will go to the center file with ▲R-58, and then, for example, ▲B-97, ▲S-66, ▲N-77, with the aim of breaking through the center.

Although at first it was frequent for White (gote) to unthinkingly push the gold to △G-32, since it was difficult for Black (sente) to defend from a breakthrough from the center, making preparations beforehand by playing △G61-52 became more frequent. When aiming to attack from the center, pushing the pawn in the 3rd file with ▲P-36 allows the rival to attack the king on its weak points and also delays the attack, so it is often considered a bad move.

== See also ==
- Fortress opening
- Morishita System
- Akutsu Rapid Attack Fortress
- Waki System
- Spearing the Sparrow
- Fortress vs Right Fourth File Rook
- Static Rook
- Central Rook

== Bibliography ==
- 児玉孝一『必殺！カニカニ銀: ―究極の二枚銀戦法』（1992年、日本将棋連盟、ISBN 4-8197-0309-9） (Koichi Kodama's 'Hissatsu! Kani kani gin' or "Knockout! Crab Silvers: The Ultimate Two-Silvers Opening").
- 青野照市『プロの新手28』（1989年、日本将棋連盟）
- 神谷広志『奇襲虎の巻』（2003年[文庫化時のもの、当初の発行年は1994年]、毎日コミュニケーションズ）130-145頁
- 塚田泰明監修・横田稔著『序盤戦！！囲いと攻めの形』（1998年、高橋書店）
