= Morishita System =

Strategy in a Japanese board game

Fortress, Morishita System variation
☖ pieces in hand: –

9	8	7	6	5	4	3	2	1
香	桂				王	角	桂	香	1
	飛		銀	金		金			2
歩			歩			銀	歩	歩	3
	歩	歩		歩	歩	歩			4
									5
		歩	歩	歩		歩			6
歩	歩	銀	金		歩		歩	歩	7
		金	角		銀		飛		8
香	桂		玉				桂	香	9

☗ pieces in hand: –

In shogi, the Morishita System (森下システム morishita shisutemu) is a strategy used by Black in Double Fortress (Static Rook) openings. The strategy was invented by professional player Taku Morishita for which he won the prestigious Kōzō Masuda shogi award. Morishita himself has described it as a way of thinking rather than a specific strategy. Hitoshige Awaji and Teruichi Aono are well known for their efforts to systematize it.

== Overview ==
The accompanying diagram shows the basic position. The Morishita System delays moving the right attacking silver to 37 early. Instead, it simply moves the bishop to 68 allowing the king to move into the Fortress castle in subsequent moves. The position continues with Black's N-37, B-64, and P-26. While it is traditionally said in shogi that Fortress is a position in which "Black decides the position while White deals with it," in this strategy this is intentionally reversed. It can be said that the way of thinking is that with the P-26 push, the Nakahara style B-68 move is handed over.

Just like in the Katō subvariation of the S-37 variation, when the attitude is decided ahead of time, the main point of the Morishita system is for Black to wait to see the opponent's attitude before deciding on one. With the right silver on S-48 castling the king becomes the priority, and depending on White's strategy, typically S-57 and then S57-68 can be used, or alternatively the knight will be jumped to N-37 (this is also called Knight-37 strategy) and the rook moved to the third file, so that P-46 and then S-47 can be used. Finally, a S-37 strategy can also be developed from it.

For some time, the Morishita System become the dominant way to play Fortress. Compared with the earlier three strategies of R-29, Spearing the Sparrow, and Climbing Silver variation of Fortress, the "wait and see" attitude was compared with rock–paper–scissors.

=== Decline ===
By castling faster than White, the defining feature of the Morishita System also becomes a weak point insofar as it enables a Spearing the Sparrow attack. Due to this weak point, the Morishita System all but disappeared.

=== Gōda R-38 Strategy ===
Against this, Masataka Gōda's play consisting of moving the rook to R-38 without engaging in the G-67, P-74 exchange came to be called the Gōda variation. By postponing the king's move, this strategy provided capacity of resistance against Spearing the Sparrow. With the aim of exchanging pawns on the third file and so on, it was said that this strategy took over the main rationale behind the Morishita System and became a revival of its driving power. The basic idea of this strategy was to move on the third rather than on the second file by not pushing the rook pawn.

=== The Revival of Morishita System ===
While Gōda's R-38 variation was being played, Kōichi Fukaura started research on the conventional Morishita System resulting in postponing the king's move to K-88 against Spearing the Sparrow, by moving the silver to S-46, and then P-55, Px55, Sx55, hence building the position from the fifth file, which was found effective and made the Morishita System become popular once again.

== See also ==
- Fortress opening
- Waki System
- Spearing the Sparrow
- Central Rook Fortress
- Akutsu Rapid Attack Yagura
- Static Rook

== Bibliography ==
- 勝又清和 (2003). 消えた戦法の謎 (文庫版 ed.). 毎日コミュニケーションズ. ISBN 4-8399-1091-X.
- 勝又清和 (September 2013). "突き抜ける！現代将棋 第48回 現代将棋と香車". 将棋世界: 144.
- 深浦康市 (1999). これが最前線だ!. 河出書房新社.
- 森下卓 (1997). 将棋基本戦法 居飛車編. 日本将棋連盟. ISBN 4-8197-0336-6.
- 森下卓 (1999). 現代矢倉の思想. 河出書房新社. ISBN 4-309-72191-5.
- Kitao, Madoka (2011). Joseki at a glance. Translated by Kawasaki, Tomohide. Nekomado. ISBN 978-4-9052-2501-0.
