= Ureshino opening =

Shogi strategy

Ureshino's First 3 Moves
☖ pieces in hand: –

9	8	7	6	5	4	3	2	1
香	桂	銀	金	王	金	銀	桂	香	1
	飛						角		2
歩	歩	歩	歩	歩	歩		歩	歩	3
						歩			4
									5
									6
歩	歩	歩	歩	歩	歩	歩	歩	歩	7
			銀				飛		8
香	桂	角	金	玉	金	銀	桂	香	9

☗ pieces in hand: –
Basic Ureshino
Attacking Formation
☖ pieces in hand: –

9	8	7	6	5	4	3	2	1
									1
									2
									3
									4
							歩		5
				歩	銀	歩			6
歩	歩	歩	歩		歩			歩	7
					銀		飛		8
香	桂	角	金	玉	金		桂	香	9

☗ pieces in hand: –
Diagonal Climbing Silver with supporting pulled back bishop. Left gold may be moved to the 78 square for defense if opponent attacks with Static Rook.

In shogi, the Ureshino (嬉野流 ureshino-ryū) opening is a newer aggressive Static Rook opening characterized by moving the right silver to the sixth file and then pulling back the bishop to the silver's start position.

It has an element of surprise as the move sequences are nonstandard and not found in professional play.

Ureshino can be played against both Static Rook and Ranging Rook opponents.

The opening is named after amateur player Hiroaki Ureshino (嬉野宏明) who invented it.

The opening aims for a very fast attack with the tradeoff being a less secure king.

== Initial moves ==
Ureshino
☖ pieces in hand: –

9	8	7	6	5	4	3	2	1
香	桂	銀	金	王	金	銀	桂	香	1
	飛						角		2
歩	歩	歩	歩	歩	歩	歩	歩	歩	3
									4
									5
									6
歩	歩	歩	歩	歩	歩	歩	歩	歩	7
	角		銀				飛		8
香	桂		金	玉	金	銀	桂	香	9

☗ pieces in hand: –
1.S-68

Ureshino
☖ pieces in hand: –

9	8	7	6	5	4	3	2	1
香	桂	銀	金	王	金	銀	桂	香	1
	飛						角		2
歩	歩	歩	歩	歩	歩		歩	歩	3
						歩			4
									5
									6
歩	歩	歩	歩	歩	歩	歩	歩	歩	7
			銀				飛		8
香	桂	角	金	玉	金	銀	桂	香	9

☗ pieces in hand: –
1...P-344
2. B-79

1.S-68. The opening move of Ureshino. This is the surprise move as almost all shogi games start with P-76, P-26, or P-56 as the first move. (See: Shogi opening sequences § First move.)

1...P-34. For White's next move, it is most likely that they will open their bishop's diagonal by advancing their third file pawn. This move prevents Black from opening their bishop diagonal (2.P-76) as their left silver is no longer positioned to defend their bishop on 88. That is, if 1.S-68 P-34 2.P-76?, then 2...Bx88+ (Note: The board position after 2...Bx88+ would be the following: ☖ pieces in hand: 角: 9 / 8 / 7 / 6 / 5 / 4 / 3 / 2 / 1; 香 / 桂 / 銀 / 金 / 王 / 金 / 銀 / 桂 / 香 / 1; / 飛 / / / / / / / / 2; 歩 / 歩 / 歩 / 歩 / 歩 / 歩 / / 歩 / 歩 / 3; / / / / / / 歩 / / / 4; / / / / / / / / / 5; / / 歩 / / / / / / / 6; 歩 / 歩 / / 歩 / 歩 / 歩 / 歩 / 歩 / 歩 / 7; / 馬 / / 銀 / / / / 飛 / / 8; 香 / 桂 / / 金 / 玉 / 金 / 銀 / 桂 / 香 / 9; ☗ pieces in hand: – 2...Bx88+ After this, Black would lose a bishop and be forced to protect their left knight with 3.G-79. However, White could still capture Black's left lance with their horse (3...+Bx99), and, more importantly, Black's camp is breached very early in the game. This blunder is clearly a losing position for Black.)

It is also possible for White to push their rook pawn (1...P-84) instead of opening the bishop diagonal. In this case, Black may subsequently attempt a Double Fortress opening by opening their bishop diagonal (2.P-76). (Alternately, Bishop Exchange or Snowroof openings could be used with this sequence.) Then, this move sequence is just a transposition of the usual 1.P-76 P-84 2.S-68 order. Attempting to use a Ureshino formation after 1...P-84 is slow and not recommended by Amano (2015). Thus, Ureshino requires 1...P-34 and is prevented by 1...P-84.

2.B-79. Since their bishop is now confined behind Black's camp (due to the pressure from White's bishop), Black must quickly move their bishop into a position in which the bishop can be used effectively. Thus, the bishop is pulled back to the seventh file aiming at the 57 square, which Black will open with a future P-56 pawn push. This move, however, does leave their eighth file pawn vulnerable, tempting White to start a Static Rook attack on that file, which is part of Black's plan.

== Against Static Rook ==
vs Static Rook
☖ pieces in hand: –

9	8	7	6	5	4	3	2	1
香	桂	銀	金	王	金	銀	桂	香	1
	飛						角		2
歩		歩	歩	歩	歩		歩	歩	3
	歩					歩			4
									5
									6
歩	歩	歩	歩	歩	歩	歩	歩	歩	7
		金	銀				飛		8
香	桂	角		玉	金	銀	桂	香	9

☗ pieces in hand: –
2...P-84
3. G-78
vs Static Rook
☖ pieces in hand: –

9	8	7	6	5	4	3	2	1
香	桂	銀	金	王	金	銀	桂	香	1
	飛						角		2
歩		歩	歩	歩	歩		歩	歩	3
						歩			4
	歩								5
									6
歩	歩	歩	歩	歩	歩	歩	歩	歩	7
		金	銀		銀		飛		8
香	桂	角		玉	金		桂	香	9

☗ pieces in hand: –
3...P-85
4. S-4h

2...P-84. White plays Static Rook.

3.G-78. Therefore, Black must protect their eighth file pawn with their left gold.

Note that Black's 3.G-78 could logically be transposed with 2.B-79 to result in the same position (that is, 1.S-68 P-34 2.G-78 P-84 3.B-79). However, at the moment of 2.G-78, White has not given any indication that they will play a Static Rook position (there was no 2...P-84 yet). Therefore, it is more prudent to wait to play G-78 after seeing White's strategy as it may be more beneficial for Black to develop their pieces toward the center or right side if White chooses a Ranging Rook strategy.

3...P-85. White continues with their rook pawn aiming to trade the pawns to get a pawn in hand and fully activating their rook.

4.S-48. Right silver advances.

Although Black needs to push their central pawn (P-56) to activate their bishop, it cannot be done at this time since after the pawn exchange on the eighth file White's rook will be positioned on rank 6 forking Black's left knight and central pawn on 56. After protecting their knight with a pawn drop, White will capture Black's central pawn: 3...P-85 4.P-56? P-86 5.Px86 Rx86 6.P*88 Rx56! However, in the variation where White trades off their rook pawn but keeps their rook on 86, Black's fifth file will be sacrificed anyway. The point here is to delay this possibility to encourage White to pull their rook back off the rank 6 so that Black can keep their fifth pawn on 56.

After 4.S-48, White's Static Rook strategy has two major options: either (i) to immediately make a pawn exchange on the eighth file to get a pawn in hand or (ii) to delay making this exchange for faster development. Both options can be used with a Climbing Silver attack, which will be tempting for White since Black has only the most minimal of defenses on their left side (only a gold on 78 missing a bishop on 88 and an uncastled king). The advantage of second option is that developing a Climbing Silver attack without the initial pawn exchange results in a faster attack since the pawn exchange requires loss of tempo. Thus, it forces Black to use a different Ureshino line for defense. Therefore, the Ureshino player prefers the first case when White makes the early rook pawn exchange.

=== White's early rook pawn exchange ===
Early Pawn Trade
☖ pieces in hand: –

9	8	7	6	5	4	3	2	1
香	桂	銀	金	王	金	銀	桂	香	1
	飛						角		2
歩		歩	歩	歩	歩		歩	歩	3
						歩			4
									5
	歩								6
歩	歩	歩	歩	歩	歩	歩	歩	歩	7
		金	銀		銀		飛		8
香	桂	角		玉	金		桂	香	9

☗ pieces in hand: –
4...P-86
Early Pawn Trade
☖ pieces in hand: 歩

9	8	7	6	5	4	3	2	1
香	桂	銀	金	王	金	銀	桂	香	1
							角		2
歩		歩	歩	歩	歩		歩	歩	3
						歩			4
									5
	飛								6
歩		歩	歩	歩	歩	歩	歩	歩	7
		金	銀		銀		飛		8
香	桂	角		玉	金		桂	香	9

☗ pieces in hand: 歩
5. Px86 Rx86

4...P-86 5.Px86 Rx86. It is common for White to initiate the pawn exchange on their rook's file when possible. And so, when faced with the Ureshino opening, White may often choose to do so.

Note that although White does get a pawn in hand, they will lose a tempo in order to do so. (See: Piece exchange and tempo loss.) Due to this tempo loss, if Black is strictly playing the Ureshino strategy, White can attack with Climbing Silver faster if White does not make this rook pawn exchange first. Thus, White's early pawn exchange is to the Ureshino player's advantage.

Early Pawn Trade
☖ pieces in hand: 歩

9	8	7	6	5	4	3	2	1
香	桂	銀	金	王	金	銀	桂	香	1
							角		2
歩		歩	歩	歩	歩		歩	歩	3
						歩			4
									5
	飛								6
歩		歩	歩	歩	歩	歩	歩	歩	7
	歩	金	銀		銀		飛		8
香	桂	角		玉	金		桂	香	9

☗ pieces in hand: –
6. P*88

6.P*88. Black protects their knight from White's rook with a pawn drop.

The pawn is dropped on the rank 8 instead of the rank 7 since this leads to the 87 square being defended by two pieces (the pawn and the gold). If Black dropped the pawn to 87, then only the gold would defend 87 allowing White to break into the eighth file with a Climbing Silver strategy where White's right silver advances to the 87 square.

At this point, White has the option of the pulling their rook back immediately in preparation for their Climbing Silver, which needs to have the attacking silver be supported by the rook from below (see §6...R-82 below). But, White also has another option of simply developing other pieces for defense as their rook can remain on the 86 square since it is not under attack (see §6...S-42 further below).

==== 6...R-82 ====
6...R-82 variation
☖ pieces in hand: 歩

9	8	7	6	5	4	3	2	1
香	桂	銀	金	王	金	銀	桂	香	1
	飛						角		2
歩		歩	歩	歩	歩		歩	歩	3
						歩			4
									5
									6
歩		歩	歩	歩	歩	歩	歩	歩	7
	歩	金	銀		銀		飛		8
香	桂	角		玉	金		桂	香	9

☗ pieces in hand: –
6...R-82

6...R-82. White retreats their rook back to its start position preparing for a Primitive Climbing Silver attack.

This choice by White allows Black to keep their fifth file pawn, which otherwise must be sacrificed if White keeps their rook on 86.

6...R-82 variation
☖ pieces in hand: 歩

9	8	7	6	5	4	3	2	1
香	桂	銀	金	王	金	銀	桂	香	1
	飛						角		2
歩		歩	歩	歩	歩		歩	歩	3
						歩			4
									5
							歩		6
歩		歩	歩	歩	歩	歩		歩	7
	歩	金	銀		銀		飛		8
香	桂	角		玉	金		桂	香	9

☗ pieces in hand: –
7. P-26

7.P-26. Black pushes their rook pawn up the second file.

After this White may choose to immediate develop a Climbing Silver attack. However, another option is develop a defense first, such as constructing a Fortress castle.

===== White's Climbing Silver =====
6...R-82 Climbing Silver
☖ pieces in hand: 歩

9	8	7	6	5	4	3	2	1
香	桂		金	王	金	銀	桂	香	1
	飛	銀					角		2
歩		歩	歩	歩	歩		歩	歩	3
						歩			4
									5
							歩		6
歩		歩	歩	歩	歩	歩		歩	7
	歩	金	銀		銀		飛		8
香	桂	角		玉	金		桂	香	9

☗ pieces in hand: –
7...S-72

7...S-72. White aims for a Primitive Climbing Silver attack on the eighth file eschewing defense development.

6...R-82 Climbing Silver
☖ pieces in hand: 歩

9	8	7	6	5	4	3	2	1
香	桂		金	王	金	銀	桂	香	1
	飛	銀							2
歩		歩	歩	歩	歩	角	歩	歩	3
						歩			4
							歩		5
									6
歩		歩	歩	歩	歩	歩		歩	7
	歩	金	銀		銀		飛		8
香	桂	角		玉	金		桂	香	9

☗ pieces in hand: –
8. P-25 B-33
6...R-82 Climbing Silver
☖ pieces in hand: 歩

9	8	7	6	5	4	3	2	1
香	桂		金	王	金	銀	桂	香	1
	飛	銀							2
歩		歩	歩	歩	歩	角	歩	歩	3
						歩			4
							歩		5
				歩					6
歩		歩	歩		歩	歩		歩	7
	歩	金	銀		銀		飛		8
香	桂	角		玉	金		桂	香	9

☗ pieces in hand: –
9. P-56

8.P-25. Black continues their Diagonal Climbing Silver development.

8...B-33. White must defend the 24 square to prevent Black from trading the second file pawns.

9.P-56. Black advances their central pawn giving an opening to the left silver which can pass through the line of pawns and clearing a path to free their bishop.

6...R-82 Climbing Silver
☖ pieces in hand: 歩

9	8	7	6	5	4	3	2	1
香	桂		金	王	金	銀	桂	香	1
	飛								2
歩	銀	歩	歩	歩	歩	角	歩	歩	3
						歩			4
							歩		5
				歩					6
歩		歩	歩	銀	歩	歩		歩	7
	歩	金			銀		飛		8
香	桂	角		玉	金		桂	香	9

☗ pieces in hand: –
9...S-83
10. S-57
6...R-82 Climbing Silver
☖ pieces in hand: 歩

9	8	7	6	5	4	3	2	1
香	桂		金	王	金	銀	桂	香	1
	飛								2
歩		歩	歩	歩	歩	角	歩	歩	3
		銀				歩			4
							歩		5
			銀	歩					6
歩		歩	歩		歩	歩		歩	7
	歩	金			銀		飛		8
香	桂	角		玉	金		桂	香	9

☗ pieces in hand: –
10...S-74
11. S-66

11.S-66. Since White's Primitive Climbing Silver is a severe threat, Black must move their left silver leftward to defend against the attack after seeing White's 10...S-74.

6...R-82 Climbing Silver
☖ pieces in hand: 歩

9	8	7	6	5	4	3	2	1
香	桂		金	王	金	銀	桂	香	1
	飛								2
歩		歩	歩	歩	歩	角	歩	歩	3
						歩			4
	銀						歩		5
			銀	歩					6
歩		歩	歩		歩	歩		歩	7
	歩	金			銀		飛		8
香	桂	角		玉	金		桂	香	9

☗ pieces in hand: –
11...S-85
6...R-82 Climbing Silver
☖ pieces in hand: 歩

9	8	7	6	5	4	3	2	1
香	桂		金	王	金	銀	桂	香	1
	飛								2
歩		歩	歩	歩	歩	角	歩	歩	3
						歩			4
	銀		銀				歩		5
				歩					6
歩		歩	歩		歩	歩		歩	7
	歩	金			銀		飛		8
香	桂	角		玉	金		桂	香	9

☗ pieces in hand: –
12. S-65

11...S-85. White moves their silver to the middle rank aiming for the 86 square in order to support a pawn drop on 87.

12.S-65. Black starts their defense by moving the silver up the 65 square. The aim to position the silver on 76 so that the silver will defend the 87 square preventing White's silver from breaking through Black's camp.

==== White's Fortress ====
6...R-82 Fortress
☖ pieces in hand: 歩

9	8	7	6	5	4	3	2	1
香	桂	銀	金	王	金		桂	香	1
	飛				銀		角		2
歩		歩	歩	歩	歩		歩	歩	3
						歩			4
									5
							歩		6
歩		歩	歩	歩	歩	歩		歩	7
	歩	金	銀		銀		飛		8
香	桂	角		玉	金		桂	香	9

☗ pieces in hand: –
7...S-42

7...S-42. Instead of immediately going into a Climbing Silver attack, White may choose to build a Fortress defense starting with developing their left silver in order to Black's next rook pawn push with S-33.

==== 6...S-42 ====
6...S-42 variation
☖ pieces in hand: 歩

9	8	7	6	5	4	3	2	1
香	桂	銀	金	王	金		桂	香	1
					銀		角		2
歩		歩	歩	歩	歩		歩	歩	3
						歩			4
									5
	飛								6
歩		歩	歩	歩	歩	歩	歩	歩	7
	歩	金	銀		銀		飛		8
香	桂	角		玉	金		桂	香	9

☗ pieces in hand: –
6...S-42

6...S-42. Instead of pulling their rook back to 82 after the eighth file pawn exchange, White can choose to keep their rook stationed on 86 while other pieces are developed. A logical choice is S-42, which will be part of an incomplete Snowroof castle with their left gold on 32 and the bishop on 33. (Another possibility would be a Fortress castle with the silver eventually on 33, the gold on 32, and the bishop remaining on 22 where it can be pulled back to 31.)

One reason for White to keep their 86 instead of pulling it back is that the Ureshino opening requires P-56 and so if White's rook remains on 86 there will eventually be a timing where Black is forced to move the fifth pawn up to rank 6 where it is undefended so that White can capture this fifth file pawn. The tradeoff with getting a pawn 'for free' is that White have the typical tempo loss associated with taking a side pawn gambit: it requires an extra tempo to move the rook back to the eighth file (cf. the Side Pawn Capture opening).

=== White's delayed rook pawn exchange ===
Fast Climbing Silver
☖ pieces in hand: –

9	8	7	6	5	4	3	2	1
香	桂		金	王	金	銀	桂	香	1
	飛	銀					角		2
歩		歩	歩	歩	歩		歩	歩	3
						歩			4
	歩								5
									6
歩	歩	歩	歩	歩	歩	歩	歩	歩	7
		金	銀		銀		飛		8
香	桂	角		玉	金		桂	香	9

☗ pieces in hand: –
4...S-72

4...S-72. Aiming for a faster Climbing Silver, White moves their right attacking silver first without making a rook pawn exchange first.

Trading off the rook pawn (via ...P-86 Px86 Rx86) also requires pulling the rook back (such as to ...R-82) so that it defends the attacking silver from below. It is this rook pullback that costs one tempo for White resulting in a slower attack. Therefore, advancing the silver above the rook first allows for a Climbing Silver attack that is one tempo earlier.

== Against Ranging Rook ==
The Ureshino opening can also be played against the various Ranging Rook positions.

=== Central Rook ===
vs Central Rook
☖ pieces in hand: –

9	8	7	6	5	4	3	2	1
香	桂	銀	金	王	金	銀	桂	香	1
	飛						角		2
歩	歩	歩	歩		歩		歩	歩	3
				歩		歩			4
									5
									6
歩	歩	歩	歩	歩	歩	歩	歩	歩	7
			銀				飛		8
香	桂	角	金	玉	金	銀	桂	香	9

☗ pieces in hand: –
2...P-54
vs Central Rook
☖ pieces in hand: –

9	8	7	6	5	4	3	2	1
香	桂	銀	金	王	金	銀	桂	香	1
	飛						角		2
歩	歩	歩	歩		歩		歩	歩	3
				歩		歩			4
									5
				歩					6
歩	歩	歩	歩		歩	歩	歩	歩	7
			銀				飛		8
香	桂	角	金	玉	金	銀	桂	香	9

☗ pieces in hand: –
3. P-56

2...P-54, 3. P-56. Unlike the Ureshino formation used against a Static Rook opponent, Ureshino against a Central Rook opponent does not need to move the left gold early to 78 since Central Rook will not attack along the eighth file.

Instead, when White advances their central pawn, the Ureshino player must respond immediately with their own central pawn push in order to prevent White from pushing their central pawn further to the 55 square. If White's pawn is positioned at this vanguard position on the middle rank, it will create problems using Black's bishop through the 57 square since it can become easy for White to position their central pawn even further on 56 preventing Black's bishop from being positioned on 57. (Note: For instance, if Black plays S-48 instead of P-56, then White can continue to push up the fifth file making it difficult to play Ureshino: ☖ pieces in hand: –: 9 / 8 / 7 / 6 / 5 / 4 / 3 / 2 / 1; 香 / 桂 / 銀 / 金 / 王 / 金 / 銀 / 桂 / 香 / 1; / 飛 / / / / / / 角 / / 2; 歩 / 歩 / 歩 / 歩 / / 歩 / / 歩 / 歩 / 3; / / / / / / 歩 / / / 4; / / / / 歩 / / / / / 5; / / / / / / / / / 6; 歩 / 歩 / 歩 / 歩 / 歩 / 歩 / 歩 / 歩 / 歩 / 7; / / / 銀 / / 銀 / / 飛 / / 8; 香 / 桂 / 角 / 金 / 玉 / 金 / / 桂 / 香 / 9; ☗ pieces in hand: –) Thus, after seeing White's P-54, Black should advance P-56 instead of S-48 or G-78.

vs Central Rook
☖ pieces in hand: –

9	8	7	6	5	4	3	2	1
香	桂	銀	金	王	金	銀	桂	香	1
				飛			角		2
歩	歩	歩	歩		歩		歩	歩	3
				歩		歩			4
									5
				歩					6
歩	歩	歩	歩		歩	歩	歩	歩	7
			銀				飛		8
香	桂	角	金	玉	金	銀	桂	香	9

☗ pieces in hand: –
3...R-52
vs Central Rook
☖ pieces in hand: –

9	8	7	6	5	4	3	2	1
香	桂	銀	金	王	金	銀	桂	香	1
				飛			角		2
歩	歩	歩	歩		歩		歩	歩	3
				歩		歩			4
									5
				歩					6
歩	歩	歩	歩	銀	歩	歩	歩	歩	7
							飛		8
香	桂	角	金	玉	金	銀	桂	香	9

☗ pieces in hand: –
4. S-57

3...R-52. White plays Central Rook.

4. S-57 S-42, 5. S-48(39).

vs Central Rook
☖ pieces in hand: –

9	8	7	6	5	4	3	2	1
香	桂	銀	金	王	金		桂	香	1
				飛	銀		角		2
歩	歩	歩	歩		歩		歩	歩	3
				歩		歩			4
									5
				歩					6
歩	歩	歩	歩	銀	歩	歩	歩	歩	7
					銀		飛		8
香	桂	角	金	玉	金		桂	香	9

☗ pieces in hand: –
4...S-42
5. S39-48
vs Central Rook
☖ pieces in hand: –

9	8	7	6	5	4	3	2	1
香	桂	銀	金		金		桂	香	1
			王	飛	銀		角		2
歩	歩	歩	歩		歩		歩	歩	3
				歩		歩			4
									5
				歩					6
歩	歩	歩	歩	銀	歩	歩	歩	歩	7
					銀		飛		8
香	桂	角	金	玉	金		桂	香	9

☗ pieces in hand: –
5...K-62

5...K-62. As is typical of Ranging Rook, White starts castling their king after moving the rook.

vs Central Rook
☖ pieces in hand: –

9	8	7	6	5	4	3	2	1
香	桂	銀	金		金		桂	香	1
		王		飛	銀				2
歩	歩	歩	歩		歩	角	歩	歩	3
				歩		歩			4
							歩		5
				歩					6
歩	歩	歩	歩	銀	歩	歩		歩	7
					銀		飛		8
香	桂	角	金	玉	金		桂	香	9

☗ pieces in hand: –
6. P-26 K-72
7. P-25 B-33
vs Central Rook
☖ pieces in hand: –

9	8	7	6	5	4	3	2	1
香	桂	銀	金		金		桂	香	1
		王		飛	銀				2
歩	歩	歩	歩			角	歩	歩	3
				歩	歩	歩			4
							歩		5
				歩	銀				6
歩	歩	歩	歩		歩	歩		歩	7
					銀		飛		8
香	桂	角	金	玉	金		桂	香	9

☗ pieces in hand: –
8. S-46 P-44

6. P-26 K-72, 7. P-25. Black advances their rook pawn while White castles their king toward the eighth file. Again, there is no need for Black to move their left to 78 since there is no Static Rook threat from their opponent.

7...B-33. White prevents Black from trading pawns on the second file.

8. S-46. Black quickly develops their left silver to fourth file. This is the initial positioning of Diagonal Climbing Silver. The idea with Ureshino is to start the attack early before White has castled their king into a Mino castle, which will be harder to attack. Thus, Black's king is not moved leftward in an attempt to make a sort of castling move.

8...P-44. White pushes their fourth file pawn in order to give their left silver a position on 43 so that the 34 pawn at the head of their bishop will be defended. Additionally, with the pawn on rank 4, it is in position to attack the silver with another push.

vs Central Rook
☖ pieces in hand: –

9	8	7	6	5	4	3	2	1
香	桂	銀	金		金		桂	香	1
		王		飛					2
歩	歩	歩	歩		銀	角	歩	歩	3
				歩	歩	歩			4
							歩		5
				歩	銀	歩			6
歩	歩	歩	歩		歩			歩	7
					銀		飛		8
香	桂	角	金	玉	金		桂	香	9

☗ pieces in hand: –
9. P-36 S-43
vs Central Rook
☖ pieces in hand: –

9	8	7	6	5	4	3	2	1
香	桂	銀	金		金		桂	香	1
		王		飛					2
歩	歩	歩	歩		銀	角	歩	歩	3
				歩	歩	歩			4
						歩	歩		5
				歩	銀				6
歩	歩	歩	歩		歩			歩	7
					銀		飛		8
香	桂	角	金	玉	金		桂	香	9

☗ pieces in hand: –
10. P-35

9. P-36. Black pushes the third file pawn in preparation for Diagonal Climbing Silver.

9...S-43. White advances their silver to protect the head of their bishop.

10. P-35. Black immediately starts their Diagonal Climbing Silver by attacking the third file.

In contrast to the traditional use of a Static Rook Boat castle against Third File Rook (Note: A Boat castle variation of a Counter-Central Rook position with a similar ☗S46 formation in preparation for a Diagonal Climbing Silver Rapid Attack would be the following: ☖ pieces in hand: –: 9 / 8 / 7 / 6 / 5 / 4 / 3 / 2 / 1; 香 / 桂 / / 金 / / / / 桂 / 香 / 1; / 王 / 銀 / / 飛 / / 金 / / / 2; / 歩 / 歩 / 歩 / / 銀 / 角 / 歩 / 歩 / 3; 歩 / / / / 歩 / 歩 / 歩 / / / 4; / / / / / / / 歩 / / 5; 歩 / / 歩 / / 歩 / 銀 / 歩 / / / 6; / 歩 / / 歩 / / 歩 / / / 歩 / 7; / 角 / 玉 / 金 / 金 / 銀 / / 飛 / / 8; 香 / 桂 / / / / / / 桂 / 香 / 9; ☗ pieces in hand: – Static Rook Boat castle Rapid Attack When faced with this 13.S-46 by Black, White will attack Black's 46-silver and simultaneously open their bishop diagonal in order to exchange bishops with P-45 like so: ☖ pieces in hand: –: 9 / 8 / 7 / 6 / 5 / 4 / 3 / 2 / 1; 香 / 桂 / / 金 / / / / 桂 / 香 / 1; / 王 / 銀 / / 飛 / / 金 / / / 2; / 歩 / 歩 / 歩 / / 銀 / 角 / 歩 / 歩 / 3; 歩 / / / / 歩 / / 歩 / / / 4; / / / / / 歩 / / 歩 / / 5; 歩 / / 歩 / / 歩 / 銀 / 歩 / / / 6; / 歩 / / 歩 / / 歩 / / / 歩 / 7; / 角 / 玉 / 金 / 金 / 銀 / / 飛 / / 8; 香 / 桂 / / / / / / 桂 / 香 / 9; ☗ pieces in hand: – 13...P-45 Black must deal with the bishop trade issue now. If Black takes the 45-pawn allowing White to initiate the exchange, then Black's attacking silver can be captured by White's knight, which is thought to be a poor exchange: 14.Sx45 Bx88+ 15.Kx88 N-33. If the Black does not take the 45-pawn and initiates the exchange, then Black's attacking silver must retreat losing tempo as well as allowing White to exchange off their fifth file pawn giving their more freedom: 14.Bx33+ Nx33 15.S-57 P-55 16.Px55 Rx55. Thus, the current theory is that a Diagonal Climbing Silver Rapid Attack with a Boat castle formation (with S-46) is inadequate against Central Rook.), Black does not fear White's pawn push on the fourth file (P-45) to attack their silver on 46 since in the Ureshino opening Black's bishop diagonal is not open and White cannot trade the bishops off the board for a counterattack to their advantage. One of the aims of the Ureshino opening is to bypass the complexities of this bishop exchange and to render P-45 an impotent attack against Black's attacking silver.

Black can expect two responses to the P-35 attack. The simplest response is for White to capture the pawn with 10...Px35. The other response is the counterattacking fourth file pawn push 10...P-45. Both are addressed in separate sections below.

==== 10...P-45 ====
vs Central Rook
☖ pieces in hand: –

9	8	7	6	5	4	3	2	1
香	桂	銀	金		金		桂	香	1
		王		飛					2
歩	歩	歩	歩		銀	角	歩	歩	3
				歩		歩			4
					歩	歩	歩		5
				歩	銀				6
歩	歩	歩	歩		歩			歩	7
					銀		飛		8
香	桂	角	金	玉	金		桂	香	9

☗ pieces in hand: –
10...P-45

10...P-45. The counterattacking fourth file pawn push is more characteristic of Ranging Rook compared with the simple 10...Px35 pawn capture. (See the §10...Px35 section below).

vs Central Rook
☖ pieces in hand: –

9	8	7	6	5	4	3	2	1
香	桂	銀	金		金		桂	香	1
		王		飛					2
歩	歩	歩	歩		銀	角	歩	歩	3
				歩		歩			4
					歩		歩		5
				歩	銀				6
歩	歩	歩	歩		歩			歩	7
					銀		飛		8
香	桂	角	金	玉	金		桂	香	9

☗ pieces in hand: 歩
11. Px34

11. Px34. Continuing the attack on the third file is the stronger option for Ureshino.

Capturing the fourth file pawn with 11. Sx45 instead is a weaker attack since the line will continue with 11...Px35, 12. Bx35 P-55. And if, Black follows with 13. Px55, 13...Rx55 forks Black's king and silver, which would be disastrous for the Ureshino player.

Now the game could continue with 11...Sx34 12. P*35 S-43 13. Sx45 P-55 when Ureshino can either continue attacking on the 3rd file with 14. P-34 or protect the 56-pawn with 14. R-86.

==== 10...Px35 ====
vs Central Rook
☖ pieces in hand: 歩

9	8	7	6	5	4	3	2	1
香	桂	銀	金		金		桂	香	1
		王		飛					2
歩	歩	歩	歩		銀	角	歩	歩	3
				歩	歩				4
						歩	歩		5
				歩	銀				6
歩	歩	歩	歩		歩			歩	7
					銀		飛		8
香	桂	角	金	玉	金		桂	香	9

☗ pieces in hand: –
10...Px35

10...Px35. White's third file pawn capture response to Black's attack. (The other response being P-45.)

vs Central Rook
☖ pieces in hand: 歩

9	8	7	6	5	4	3	2	1
香	桂	銀	金		金		桂	香	1
		王		飛					2
歩	歩	歩	歩		銀	角	歩	歩	3
				歩	歩		歩		4
						歩			5
				歩	銀				6
歩	歩	歩	歩		歩			歩	7
					銀		飛		8
香	桂	角	金	玉	金		桂	香	9

☗ pieces in hand: –
11. P-24
vs Central Rook
☖ pieces in hand: 歩歩

9	8	7	6	5	4	3	2	1
香	桂	銀	金		金		桂	香	1
		王		飛					2
歩	歩	歩	歩		銀	角		歩	3
				歩	歩		歩		4
						歩			5
				歩	銀				6
歩	歩	歩	歩		歩			歩	7
					銀		飛		8
香	桂	角	金	玉	金		桂	香	9

☗ pieces in hand: –
11...Px24

11. P-24. The correct response for Ureshino is to continue the attack on the second file with P-24.

Taking White's third file pawn with 11. Sx35 first is a mistake since this gives White time to attack the silver by dropping 11...P*34. And if Black continues with 12. P-24, White will capture the silver with 12...Px35 (and will not defend with 12...Px24). After 13. Px23+ B-42, 14. +P-12 N-33, 15. R-21+ G41-51, 16. +Rx11 P-55, 17. Px55 Rx55, 18. K-68 P-36, 19. P*26 N-45, 20. K-78 P-37+, 21. Nx37 Nx37+, 22. Sx37 N*57, 23. Bx57 Rx57+, 24. L*58 +Rx47, Black will be at an obvious disadvantage.

vs Central Rook
☖ pieces in hand: 歩歩

9	8	7	6	5	4	3	2	1
香	桂	銀	金		金		桂	香	1
		王		飛					2
歩	歩	歩	歩		銀	角		歩	3
				歩	歩		歩		4
						銀			5
				歩					6
歩	歩	歩	歩		歩			歩	7
					銀		飛		8
香	桂	角	金	玉	金		桂	香	9

☗ pieces in hand: 歩
12. Sx35
vs Central Rook
☖ pieces in hand: 歩歩

9	8	7	6	5	4	3	2	1
香	桂	銀	金		金		桂	香	1
		王		飛	角				2
歩	歩	歩	歩		銀			歩	3
				歩	歩		歩		4
						銀			5
				歩					6
歩	歩	歩	歩		歩			歩	7
					銀		飛		8
香	桂	角	金	玉	金		桂	香	9

☗ pieces in hand: 歩
12...B-42

vs Central Rook
☖ pieces in hand: 歩歩

9	8	7	6	5	4	3	2	1
香	桂	銀	金		金		桂	香	1
		王		飛					2
歩	歩	歩	歩		銀			歩	3
			角	歩	歩		銀		4
									5
				歩					6
歩	歩	歩	歩		歩			歩	7
					銀		飛		8
香	桂	角	金	玉	金		桂	香	9

☗ pieces in hand: 歩歩
13. Sx24 B-64
vs Central Rook
☖ pieces in hand: 歩歩

9	8	7	6	5	4	3	2	1
香	桂	銀	金		金		桂	香	1
		王		飛					2
歩	歩	歩	歩		銀			歩	3
			角	歩	歩		銀		4
									5
				歩					6
歩	歩	歩	歩		歩	歩		歩	7
					銀		飛		8
香	桂	角	金	玉	金		桂	香	9

☗ pieces in hand: 歩
14. P*37

11...Px24 12.Sx35 B42 13.Sx24 B64.

14. P*37. This pawn drop is forced to prevent White's bishop from capturing Black's rook.

If Black blocks with their silver (14. S-37), White will simply attack the silver with pawn drops and pushes in order to capture it: 14...P*36, 15. S-46 P-45.

== New Ureshino ==
There is an updated variation known as the New Ureshino (新嬉野流), which has a different set of initial moves.

== See also ==
- Static Rook
- Shogi opening

== Bibliography ==
- 天野, 貴元 [Amano, Yoshimoto] [in Japanese] (2015). 奇襲研究所: 嬉野流編. マイナビ出版.
- 本間, 博 [Honma, Hiroshi] [in Japanese] (2017). "嬉野流". これで万全!: 奇襲破り事典. マイナビ出版. pp. 98–109.
