= Waki System =

Shogi opening

Fortress, Waki System variation
☖ pieces in hand: –

9	8	7	6	5	4	3	2	1
香	桂						桂	香	1
	飛					金	王		2
		銀	歩		金	銀	歩		3
歩		歩	角	歩	歩	歩		歩	4
	歩						歩		5
歩		歩	歩	歩	角	歩		歩	6
	歩	銀	金		歩	銀			7
	玉	金					飛		8
香	桂						桂	香	9

☗ pieces in hand: –

In shogi, Waki System (脇システム waki shisutemu) is a symmetrical Double Fortress (Static Rook) opening.

It is characterized in part by positioning Black's bishop on the 46 square and White's bishop on the 64 square allowing for a bishop exchange.

The strategy is named after Kenji Waki.

== Development ==
...P-74
☖ pieces in hand: –

9	8	7	6	5	4	3	2	1
香	桂		金		王		桂	香	1
	飛		銀		銀	金	角		2
歩			歩		歩		歩	歩	3
	歩	歩		歩		歩			4
									5
		歩	歩	歩					6
歩	歩				歩	歩	歩	歩	7
	角	金	銀	金	銀		飛		8
香	桂		玉				桂	香	9

☗ pieces in hand: –
24-Move Fortress Set
☖ pieces in hand: –

9	8	7	6	5	4	3	2	1
香	桂				王	角	桂	香	1
	飛		銀	金		金			2
歩			歩			銀	歩	歩	3
	歩	歩		歩	歩	歩			4
									5
		歩	歩	歩		歩			6
歩	歩	銀	金		歩		歩	歩	7
		金			銀		飛		8
香	桂	角	玉				桂	香	9

☗ pieces in hand: –

An early ...P-74 (as opposed to an early ...G-52) is the most common move leading to the standard 24-Move Fortress Set (矢倉24手組) position, which is one of the major branching points of the set of Fortress substrategies.

S-37
☖ pieces in hand: –

9	8	7	6	5	4	3	2	1
香	桂				王	角	桂	香	1
	飛		銀	金		金			2
歩			歩			銀	歩	歩	3
	歩	歩		歩	歩	歩			4
									5
		歩	歩	歩		歩			6
歩	歩	銀	金		歩	銀	歩	歩	7
		金					飛		8
香	桂	角	玉				桂	香	9

☗ pieces in hand: –
Waki System
☖ pieces in hand: –

9	8	7	6	5	4	3	2	1
香	桂				王		桂	香	1
	飛		銀	金		金			2
歩			歩			銀	歩	歩	3
	歩	歩	角	歩	歩	歩			4
									5
		歩	歩	歩		歩			6
歩	歩	銀	金		歩	銀	歩	歩	7
		金					飛		8
香	桂	角	玉				桂	香	9

☗ pieces in hand: –

13. S-37. The Waki System is a silver-37 branch Fortress substrategy.

13. ...B-64. The Waki System form starts with White moving their bishop to 64 temporarily pinning Black's silver to their rook.

Waki System
☖ pieces in hand: –

9	8	7	6	5	4	3	2	1
香	桂				王		桂	香	1
	飛		銀	金		金			2
歩			歩			銀	歩	歩	3
	歩	歩	角	歩	歩	歩			4
									5
		歩	歩	歩	角	歩			6
歩	歩	銀	金		歩	銀	歩	歩	7
		金					飛		8
香	桂		玉				桂	香	9

☗ pieces in hand: –

14. B-46. In response, Black opposes White's bishop by moving their own bishop to 46.

This positioning allows the bishops to be traded off in order to place them in hand.

=== 14. ..S-73 ===
Waki System
☖ pieces in hand: –

9	8	7	6	5	4	3	2	1
香	桂				王		桂	香	1
	飛			金		金			2
歩		銀	歩			銀	歩	歩	3
	歩	歩	角	歩	歩	歩			4
									5
		歩	歩	歩	角	歩			6
歩	歩	銀	金		歩	銀	歩	歩	7
		金					飛		8
香	桂		玉				桂	香	9

☗ pieces in hand: –

Waki System
☖ pieces in hand: –

9	8	7	6	5	4	3	2	1
香	桂				王		桂	香	1
	飛					金			2
歩		銀	歩		金	銀	歩	歩	3
	歩	歩	角	歩	歩	歩			4
									5
		歩	歩	歩	角	歩			6
歩	歩	銀	金		歩	銀	歩	歩	7
		金					飛		8
香	桂	玉					桂	香	9

☗ pieces in hand: –
Waki System
☖ pieces in hand: –

9	8	7	6	5	4	3	2	1
香	桂						桂	香	1
	飛					金	王		2
		銀	歩		金	銀	歩	歩	3
歩		歩	角	歩	歩	歩			4
	歩						歩		5
		歩	歩	歩	角	歩		歩	6
歩	歩	銀	金		歩	銀			7
	玉	金					飛		8
香	桂						桂	香	9

☗ pieces in hand: –

==== 20. P-96 ====
Waki System
☖ pieces in hand: –

9	8	7	6	5	4	3	2	1
香	桂						桂	香	1
	飛					金	王		2
		銀	歩		金	銀	歩	歩	3
歩		歩	角	歩	歩	歩			4
	歩						歩		5
歩		歩	歩	歩	角	歩		歩	6
	歩	銀	金		歩	銀			7
	玉	金					飛		8
香	桂						桂	香	9

☗ pieces in hand: –

Waki System
☖ pieces in hand: –

9	8	7	6	5	4	3	2	1
香	桂						桂	香	1
	飛					金	王		2
		銀	歩		金	銀	歩		3
歩		歩	角	歩	歩	歩		歩	4
	歩						歩		5
歩		歩	歩	歩	角	歩		歩	6
	歩	銀	金		歩	銀			7
	玉	金					飛		8
香	桂						桂	香	9

☗ pieces in hand: –
Waki System
☖ pieces in hand: –

9	8	7	6	5	4	3	2	1
香	桂						桂	香	1
	飛					金	王		2
		銀	歩		金	銀	歩		3
歩		歩	馬	歩	歩	歩		歩	4
	歩						歩		5
歩		歩	歩	歩		歩		歩	6
	歩	銀	金		歩	銀			7
	玉	金					飛		8
香	桂						桂	香	9

☗ pieces in hand: 角

==== 20. P-15 variation ====
Waki System
☖ pieces in hand: –

9	8	7	6	5	4	3	2	1
香	桂						桂	香	1
	飛					金	王		2
		銀	歩		金	銀	歩	歩	3
歩		歩	角	歩	歩	歩			4
	歩						歩	歩	5
		歩	歩	歩	角	歩			6
歩	歩	銀	金		歩	銀			7
	玉	金					飛		8
香	桂						桂	香	9

☗ pieces in hand: –

Waki System
☖ pieces in hand: –

9	8	7	6	5	4	3	2	1
香	桂						桂	香	1
	飛					金	王		2
		銀	歩		金	銀	歩	歩	3
		歩	角	歩	歩	歩			4
歩	歩						歩	歩	5
		歩	歩	歩	角	歩			6
歩	歩	銀	金		歩	銀			7
	玉	金					飛		8
香	桂						桂	香	9

☗ pieces in hand: –
Waki System
☖ pieces in hand: –

9	8	7	6	5	4	3	2	1
香	桂						桂	香	1
	飛					金	王		2
		銀	歩		金	銀	歩	歩	3
		歩	角	歩	歩	歩			4
歩	歩					歩	歩	歩	5
		歩	歩	歩	角				6
歩	歩	銀	金		歩	銀			7
	玉	金					飛		8
香	桂						桂	香	9

☗ pieces in hand: –

=== 14. ...B-73 variation ===
Waki System
☖ pieces in hand: –

9	8	7	6	5	4	3	2	1
香	桂				王		桂	香	1
	飛		銀	金		金			2
歩		角	歩			銀	歩	歩	3
	歩	歩		歩	歩	歩			4
									5
		歩	歩	歩	角	歩			6
歩	歩	銀	金		歩	銀	歩	歩	7
		金					飛		8
香	桂		玉				桂	香	9

☗ pieces in hand: –

Waki System
☖ pieces in hand: –

9	8	7	6	5	4	3	2	1
香	桂				王		桂	香	1
	飛		銀	金		金			2
歩		馬	歩			銀	歩	歩	3
	歩	歩		歩	歩	歩			4
									5
		歩	歩	歩		歩			6
歩	歩	銀	金		歩	銀	歩	歩	7
		金					飛		8
香	桂		玉				桂	香	9

☗ pieces in hand: 角
Waki System
☖ pieces in hand: 角

9	8	7	6	5	4	3	2	1
香	桂				王		桂	香	1
	飛			金		金			2
歩		銀	歩			銀	歩	歩	3
	歩	歩		歩	歩	歩			4
									5
		歩	歩	歩		歩			6
歩	歩	銀	金		歩	銀	歩	歩	7
		金					飛		8
香	桂		玉				桂	香	9

☗ pieces in hand: 角

Waki System
☖ pieces in hand: 角

9	8	7	6	5	4	3	2	1
香	桂					王	桂	香	1
	飛			金		金			2
歩		銀	歩			銀	歩	歩	3
	歩	歩		歩	歩	歩			4
									5
		歩	歩	歩		歩			6
歩	歩	銀	金		歩	銀	歩	歩	7
		金					飛		8
香	桂	玉					桂	香	9

☗ pieces in hand: 角
Waki System
☖ pieces in hand: 角

9	8	7	6	5	4	3	2	1
香	桂						桂	香	1
	飛					金	王		2
歩			歩		金	銀	歩	歩	3
		歩	銀	歩	歩	歩			4
	歩						歩		5
歩		歩	歩	歩	銀	歩			6
	歩	銀	金		歩			歩	7
	玉	金					飛		8
香	桂						桂	香	9

☗ pieces in hand: 角

==== ...P-14 variation ====
Waki System
☖ pieces in hand: 角

9	8	7	6	5	4	3	2	1
香	桂						桂	香	1
	飛					金	王		2
歩			歩		金	銀	歩		3
		歩	銀	歩	歩	歩		歩	4
	歩						歩		5
歩		歩	歩	歩	銀	歩			6
	歩	銀	金		歩			歩	7
	玉	金					飛		8
香	桂						桂	香	9

☗ pieces in hand: 角

==== ...P-94 variation ====
Waki System
☖ pieces in hand: 角

9	8	7	6	5	4	3	2	1
香	桂						桂	香	1
	飛					金	王		2
			歩		金	銀	歩	歩	3
歩		歩	銀	歩	歩	歩			4
	歩						歩		5
歩		歩	歩	歩	銀	歩			6
	歩	銀	金		歩			歩	7
	玉	金					飛		8
香	桂						桂	香	9

☗ pieces in hand: 角

== See also ==
- Fortress opening
- Morishita System
- Spearing the Sparrow
- Akutsu Rapid Attack Yagura
- Central Rook Fortress
- Right Fourth File Rook#Yagura vs Right Fourth File Rook
- Static Rook

== Bibliography ==
- 脇謙二『単純明快矢倉・脇システム』毎日コミュニケーションズ、 1994年、ISBN 978-4895636148
- Kitao, Madoka (2011). Joseki at a glance. Translated by Kawasaki, Tomohide. Nekomado. ISBN 978-4-9052-2501-0.
