= Yagura =

Yagura may refer to:

- Yagura castle
- Yagura opening
- Yagura (tombs)
- Yagura (tower)

== People with the surname ==
- Fuuko Yagura (矢倉 楓子, born 1997), Japanese singer and idol
- Norihiro Yagura

== See also ==
- Yugara (disambiguation)
