= Ninja Silver =

☖ pieces in hand: -

9	8	7	6	5	4	3	2	1
香	桂				王	角	桂	香	1
	飛		銀			金			2
歩		歩	歩		金	銀	歩	歩	3
				歩	歩	歩			4
	歩					歩	歩		5
		歩	銀	歩	銀				6
歩	歩		歩		歩			歩	7
	角	金					飛		8
香	桂		玉		金		桂	香	9

☗ pieces in hand: -
Ninja Silver: an example of the opening

Ninja Silver (忍者銀 ninja gin) is a shogi strategy used as part of the rapid attack Yagura.

== Explanation ==
In 2014, Nobuyuki Yashiki (9th-Dan) began using this strategy as one of his specialties. The Yashiki-style twin silvers strategy is also called "nin-nin". The name comes from Yashiki's nickname "Ninja Yashiki", as his play-style was often varied and was difficult to predict.

The basic strategy is a quick-attack in a Double Yagura game. The shape in the diagram is referred to as "Ninja Silver", with a pawn having advanced from a twin silvers position. The basic procedure is to advance the right silver to 37, and to move the left silver not to 77, but first to 57 and then 66, keeping the bishop's line open.

From there, as in the diagram, the silvers line up in the center (in some cases), the central pawn is exchanged, and the attack begins with the aim of exchanging the bishop and silver along the 3rd-file (or 7th-file for Gote). The right silver can also be used as a Climbing Silver.

☖ pieces in hand: 歩

9	8	7	6	5	4	3	2	1
香	桂				王	角	桂	香	1
	飛		銀			金			2
歩		歩	歩		金	銀	歩	歩	3
					歩	歩			4
	歩			銀			歩	銀	5
歩		歩							6
	歩		歩		歩	歩		歩	7
	角	金					飛		8
香	桂		玉		金		桂	香	9

☗ pieces in hand: 歩
Ninja Silver: an example using Climbing Silver
74th Meijin Title Match, Class A 8th Match
Akira Watanabe vs Nobuyuki Yashiki
☖ pieces in hand: 歩

9	8	7	6	5	4	3	2	1
香	桂		金		王		桂	香	1
	飛					金	角		2
歩			歩		金		歩		3
					銀			歩	4
		銀		歩		歩			5
	歩		歩	歩					6
歩	歩	銀	金		歩	角		歩	7
		金			銀		飛		8
香	桂	玉					桂	香	9

☗ pieces in hand: 歩x3
Example of Ninja Silver in a real game against Yagura
65th NHK Cup, 2nd Round, 10th Match
Takeshi Fujii vs Nobuyuki Yashiki
☖ pieces in hand: 歩

9	8	7	6	5	4	3	2	1
香	桂		金		金		桂	香	1
	飛					王	角		2
歩			歩		金		歩		3
			銀	歩	銀	歩		歩	4
	歩	歩							5
		歩	歩	歩	歩			歩	6
歩	歩	角	銀	金		歩	歩		7
		飛				銀	玉		8
香	桂				金		桂	香	9

☗ pieces in hand: 歩
Example of Ninja Silver in a real game against Ranging Rook

As in the diagrams, Yashiki played this strategy as both Sente and Gote, and used it against both Yagura and Ranging Rook strategies.

== See also ==
- Rushing Silver
- Crab Silvers
