= Central Rook Fortress =

Opening sequence in shogi

Fortress Central Rook (White)
☖ pieces in hand: –

9	8	7	6	5	4	3	2	1
香	桂		金		王		桂	香	1
				飛	銀	金	角		2
歩			銀		歩		歩	歩	3
	歩	歩	歩	歩		歩			4
									5
		歩	歩	歩			歩		6
歩	歩	銀	金		歩	歩		歩	7
	角	金			銀		飛		8
香	桂		玉				桂	香	9

☗ pieces in hand: –

Central Rook Fortress (矢倉中飛車 yagura nakabisha) is a Double Fortress (Double Static Rook) shogi opening.

This strategy characteristically swings the player's rook to the central file to support an attack there.

Central Rook Fortress should not be confused with Yagura's Central Rook (矢倉流中飛車 yagura-ryuu nakabisha) which is an unrelated Central Rook strategy named after professional player Norihiro Yagura.

== See also ==
- Fortress opening
- Morishita System
- Akutsu Rapid Attack Yagura
- Waki System
- Spearing the Sparrow
- Yagura vs Right Fourth File Rook
- Static Rook
- Central Rook

== Bibliography ==
- 森下卓 『将棋基本戦法 居飛車編』 日本将棋連盟、1997年9月10日 ISBN 4-8197-0336-6
- 森下卓 『なんでも中飛車』 創元社 2003年
