= Akutsu Rapid Attack Fortress =

Double Fortress opening

Akutsu Rapid Attack Fortress
☖ pieces in hand: 歩

9	8	7	6	5	4	3	2	1
香	桂		金		王		桂	香	1
	飛				銀	金			2
歩			歩	銀	歩		歩	歩	3
		歩				歩			4
	歩			角					5
		歩	歩				歩		6
歩	歩	銀	金		歩	歩		歩	7
	角	金			銀		飛		8
香	桂		玉				桂	香	9

☗ pieces in hand: 歩

In shogi, Akutsu Rapid Attack Fortress (阿久津流急戦矢倉 akutsu-ryū kyūsen yagura) is a Double Fortress (Static Rook) opening.

This style of Fortress was named after professional player Chikara Akutsu who has used this strategy with good results.

Akutsu Rapid Attack Fortress is typically used by White. It is characterized by White keeping their bishop diagonal open so that the central file pawns may be exchanged.

Following the pawn exchange on the fifth file with the bishop, the goal of White is to build a good position with their right silver advanced to the 54 square, so as to later start the fight on the sixth file with a pawn push (☖P-65). The bishop on the 55 square can be pulled back on White's right side to the 73 square or returned its starting square on 22. Depending on Black's response, the goal mentioned above is often rejected and there's a shift to a slow game.

== See also ==
- Fortress opening
- Morishita System
- Spearing the Sparrow
- Waki System
- Central Rook Fortress
- Right Fourth File Rook#Yagura vs Right Fourth File Rook
- Static Rook

== Bibliography ==
- 勝又清和 『消えた戦法の謎』 毎日コミュニケーションズ、1995年12月25日、ISBN 978-4-8956-3645-2
- 金井恒太 『対急戦矢倉必勝ガイド』 毎日コミュニケーションズ、2010年8月31日、ISBN 978-4-8399-3463-7
- 渡辺明 『永世竜王への軌跡』 毎日コミュニケーションズ、2009年7月31日、ISBN 978-4-839-93236-7
