= Kenji Waki =

Japanese Shogi player

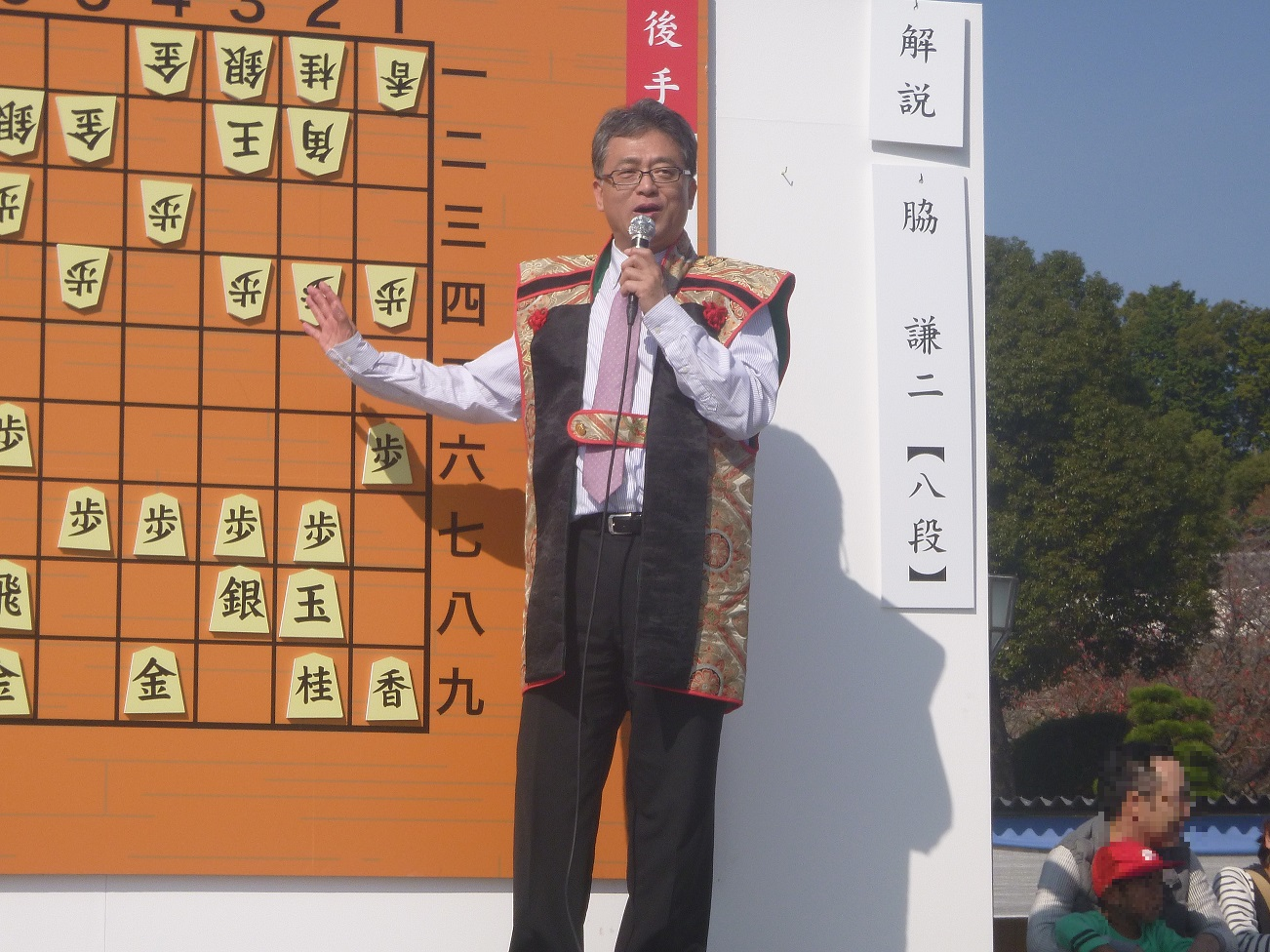
- Kenji Waki in Himeji, Japan (November 11, 2018)
- Native name: 脇謙二
- Born: August 10, 1960 (age 65)
- Hometown: Osaka

Career
- Achieved professional status: July 16, 1979 (aged 18)
- Badge number: 138
- Rank: 9-dan
- Retired: May 1, 2026 (aged 65)
- Teacher: Kazukiyo Takashima (9-dan)
- Tournaments won: 3
- Career record: 661–754 (.467)

Websites
- JSA profile page

Kenji Waki (脇 謙二, Waki Kenji; born August 10, 1960) is a Japanese retired professional shogi player who achieved the rank of 9-dan. He is also the senior managing director of the Japan Shogi Association, and has been as such since June 2019.

== Early life and apprenticeship ==
Waki was born on August 10, 1960, in Osaka, Japan. He learned shogi at a shogi class taught by shogi professional Kazukiyo Takashima, and in 1975 he was accepted into the Japan Shogi Association's apprentice school under the guidance of Takashima at the rank of 5-kyū. He was promoted to the rank of 1-dan in 1977, and obtained full professional status and the rank of 4-dan in October 1978.

== Shogi professional ==
Waki became the 48th professional to win 600 official games when he defeated Masahiko Urano on February 3, 2015.

In March 2019, Waki voluntarily declared himself as a free class player, thus leaving the Meijin tournament league.

On April 1, 2026, the JSA announced Waki had met the conditions for mandatory retirement for "Free Class" players and his retirement would become official upon completion of his final scheduled game of the 2026–2027 shogi season. Waki's retirement became official upon losing to Takanori An'yōji on May 1, 2026, in a 39th Ryūō Group 6 game. He finished his career with a record of 661 wins and 754 losses for a winning percentage of 0.467.

=== Theoretical contributions ===
Waki is known for his innovations in the Yagura opening, and the Waki System is named after him.

=== Promotion history ===
The promotion history for Waki is as follows:

- 5-kyū: 1975
- 1-dan: 1977
- 4-dan: July 16, 1979
- 5-dan: April 1, 1983
- 6-dan: April 1, 1984
- 7-dan: October 1, 1990
- 8-dan: November 16, 2000
- 9-dan: April 1, 2021
- Retired: June 1, 2026

=== Titles and other championships ===
Waki has yet to appear in a major title match, but he has won three non-title championships during his career. He won the Young Lions Tournament once (1983), and the Quick Play Young Professionals Tournament twice (1984 and 1985).

=== Awards and honors ===
Waki received the JSA's "25 Years Service Award" in recognition of being an active professional for twenty-five years in 2004, and the "Shogi Honor Award" in recognition of winning 600 official games as a professional in 2015. He also received the Japan Shogi Association's “Masuda Special Prize” Annual Shogi Award for the 2019–2020 shogi year.

== JSA director ==
Waki was selected to be the senior managing director of the Japan Shogi Association's board of directors for a two-year term at the association's 70th General Meeting on June 7, 2019, and re-elected to additional two-year terms in June 2021, June 2023 and June 2025.

Waki stated he intended to finish out the remainder of his two-year term as JSA managing director (until June 2027) even though he retired from active play in May 2026.

== Personal life ==
Waki is married to professional Go player Masako Araki.
