= Spearing the Sparrow =

Spearing the Sparrow
☖ pieces in hand: –

9	8	7	6	5	4	3	2	1
									1
									2
									3
									4
							桂	歩	5
		歩	歩	歩		歩	歩		6
歩	歩	銀	金		歩			香	7
	玉	金	角		銀			飛	8
香	桂								9

☗ pieces in hand: –

In shogi, Spearing the Sparrow (雀刺し or スズメ刺し suzumezashi) is one of the substrategies of the Fortress (Static Rook) class of openings. The strategy is basically an edge attack on the first file if played by Black or the ninth file if played by White. The player's rook characteristically moves to the respective edge file to support an attack there along with the right knight, the edge pawn, the right lance, and the bishop.

== See also ==
- Fortress opening
- Morishita System
- Akutsu Rapid Attack Yagura
- Waki System
- Central Rook Fortress
- Right Fourth File Rook#Yagura vs Right Fourth File Rook
- Static Rook

== Bibliography ==
- 勝又清和 『消えた戦法の謎』 毎日コミュニケーションズ 1995年
- Aono, Teruichi (1983). Guide to shogi openings: Unlock the secrets of joseki 将棋定跡のカギ: 和英 定跡問題集. Translated by Fairbairn, John. 山海堂. ISBN 4-381-00598-8.
- Hosking, Tony (1996). The art of shogi. The Shogi Foundation. ISBN 978-0-95310-890-9.
- Kiriyama, Kiyozumi (1978). "Spearing the sparrow". Shogi (15). Translated by Fairbairn, John: 16–18.
- Kitao, Madoka (2011). Joseki at a glance. Translated by Kawasaki, Tomohide. Nekomado. ISBN 978-4-9052-2501-0.
- Kitao, Madoka (2013). Sabaki at a glance. Translated by Kawasaki, Tomohide. Nekomado. ISBN 978-4-9052-2510-2.
