= Yagara =

Yagara or Yagera may refer to:

- Yagara people, an ethnic group of Australia
- Yagara language, formerly spoken by them

== See also ==
- Kenichi Yagara, Japanese football player
- Yagura (disambiguation)
