= Fortress vs Right Fourth File Rook =

Shogi opening

Fortress vs Right Fourth File Rook (矢倉対右四間飛車) is a Double Static Rook opening in which one player chooses a Fortress position and their opponent uses a Right Fourth File Rook position.

== Development ==
Fortress vs Right 4th File Rook
up to move 7
☖ pieces in hand: –

9	8	7	6	5	4	3	2	1
香	桂		金	王	金	銀	桂	香	1
	飛		銀				角		2
歩		歩	歩	歩	歩		歩	歩	3
	歩					歩			4
									5
		歩	歩	歩					6
歩	歩				歩	歩	歩	歩	7
	角		銀				飛		8
香	桂		金	玉	金	銀	桂	香	9

☗ pieces in hand: –
4. P-56

Fortress vs Right 4th File Rook
up to move 9
☖ pieces in hand: –

9	8	7	6	5	4	3	2	1
香	桂		金	王	金	銀	桂	香	1
	飛		銀				角		2
歩		歩	歩	歩	歩		歩	歩	3
						歩			4
	歩								5
		歩	歩	歩					6
歩	歩	銀			歩	歩	歩	歩	7
	角						飛		8
香	桂		金	玉	金	銀	桂	香	9

☗ pieces in hand: –
4... P-25
5. S-77

Another Double Static Rook game includes playing Right Fourth File Rook against a Fortress position.

If White is going to attempt Right Fourth File Rook, then after Black advances their central pawn on the fifth move, White should push their rook pawn to the central file forcing White to protect the second with their silver.

Fortress vs Right 4th File Rook
up to move 10
☖ pieces in hand: –

9	8	7	6	5	4	3	2	1
香	桂		金	王	金	銀	桂	香	1
	飛		銀				角		2
歩		歩		歩	歩		歩	歩	3
			歩			歩			4
	歩								5
		歩	歩	歩					6
歩	歩	銀			歩	歩	歩	歩	7
	角						飛		8
香	桂		金	玉	金	銀	桂	香	9

☗ pieces in hand: –
5... P-64

Fortress vs Right 4th File Rook
up to move 13
☖ pieces in hand: –

9	8	7	6	5	4	3	2	1
香	桂		金	王	金	銀	桂	香	1
	飛						角		2
歩		歩	銀	歩	歩		歩	歩	3
			歩			歩			4
	歩								5
		歩	歩	歩					6
歩	歩	銀			歩	歩	歩	歩	7
	角	金		金			飛		8
香	桂			玉		銀	桂	香	9

☗ pieces in hand: –
6. G-78 S-63
7. G-58

After this, White starts developing the Right Fourth File Rook structure by advancing their sixth file pawn (that is, their pawn that is the fourth file from the right side of their board). White aims to move their right silver to the central file through the sixth file and their rook to the sixth file while Black continues building their Fortress position.

== Bibliography ==
- 斎藤, 慎太郎 [in Japanese] (2016). 対矢倉: 左美濃新型急戦. マイナビ出版.
