= Fortress castle =

Gold Fortress
☖ pieces in hand: –

9	8	7	6	5	4	3	2	1
									1
									2
									3
									4
									5
		歩	歩	歩					6
歩	歩	銀	金						7
	玉	金							8
香	桂								9

☗ pieces in hand: –

Fortress or Yagura (矢倉囲い or 櫓囲い yaguragakoi) is a castle used in shogi. It is considered by many to be the strongest defensive position in shogi in Double Static Rook games.

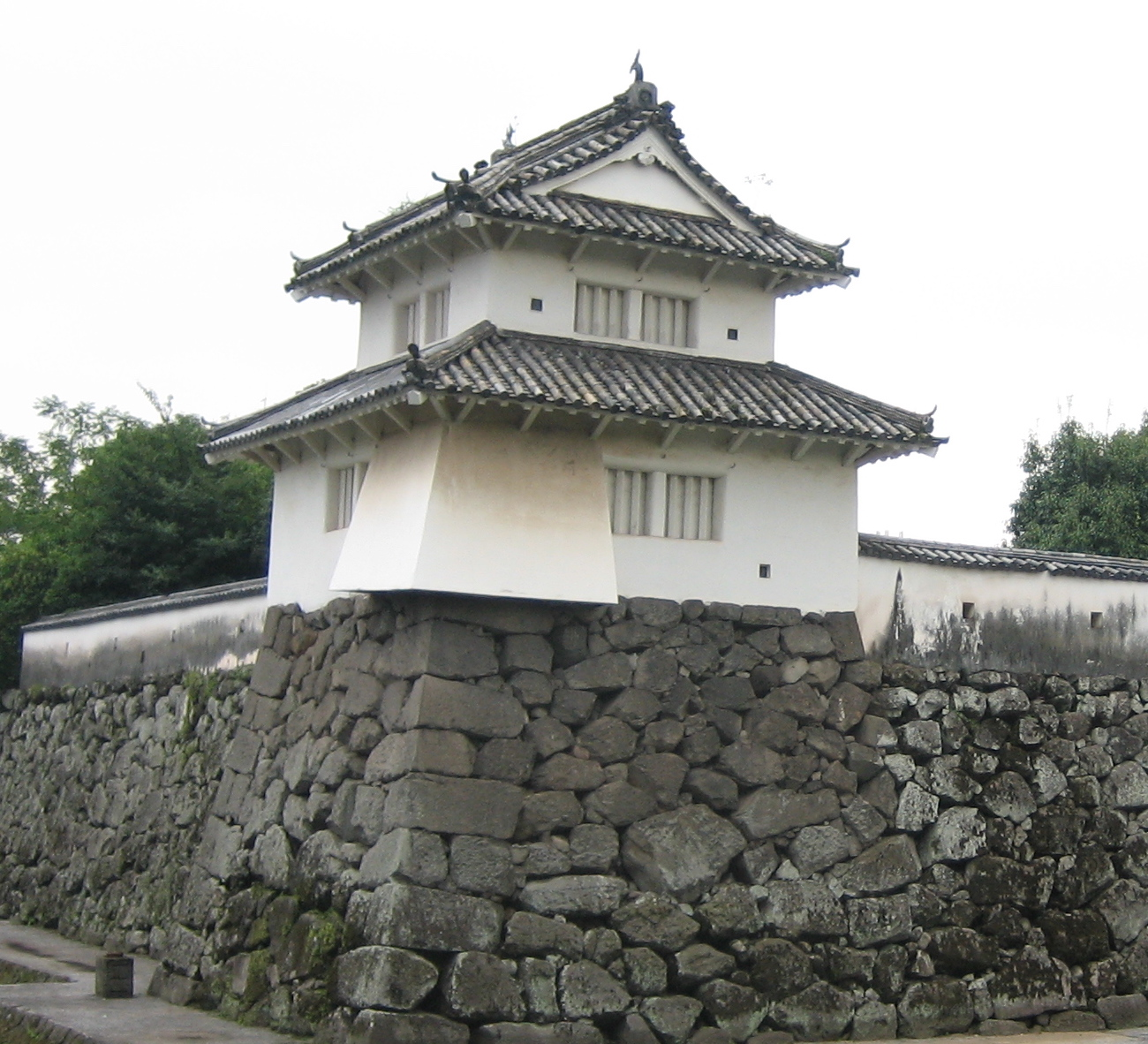
A yagura

The most common form of Fortress is the Gold Fortress. Besides the Gold Fortress, there are many variant forms. And, there are development relations between Fortress and other castles. For instance, the Crab castle can be developed into a Gold Fortress, and the Gold Fortress can be developed into a Fortress Anaguma.

Fortress is also the name of an opening strategy that uses a Fortress castle (see: Fortress opening). When used in the Fortress opening, the bishop, rook, and a pawn all support a later attack by the rook's silver or knight. Variants of the Fortress are also used in other Double Static Rook games (for instance, Bishop Exchange) as well as in Static Rook vs Ranging Rook games and in Double Ranging Rook games.

== History ==
Sansa vs Sōkei 1618
position after 50 moves
☖ pieces in hand: –

9	8	7	6	5	4	3	2	1
香	桂			角			桂	香	1
	王	金				飛			2
			金		銀		歩		3
歩	銀	歩	歩	歩	歩			歩	4
	歩					歩	歩		5
歩		歩	歩	歩	歩			歩	6
	歩	銀	金		銀				7
	玉	金				飛			8
香	桂	角					桂	香	9

☗ pieces in hand: –

The earliest recorded use of a Fortress castle structure was by Sansa Hon'inbō in a game against Sōkei Ōhashi I in 1618. It is plausible that Sansa and Sōkei invented the structure in earlier unrecorded games played against each other, although this is not confirmed. In the recorded game, Sansa was playing a Static Rook position (eventually Sleeve Rook) and Sōkei was playing a Fourth File Rook position (eventually Third File Rook).

In the modern era, Fortress castles are typically used in Static Rook positions against Static Rook opponents (that is, in Double Static Rook games). However, Static Rook positions playing against some Bishop-Exchange Ranging Rook position may also use a Fortress variant after the bishop trade off. Furthermore, Fortress castles constructed on the right side of the board may be used in Double Ranging Rook games.

== The basic form ==
Basic structure
☖ pieces in hand: –

9	8	7	6	5	4	3	2	1
									1
									2
									3
									4
									5
		歩							6
歩	歩	銀							7
		金							8
香	桂								9

☗ pieces in hand: –

The Fortress castle has the left silver on the 77 square and the right gold on the 78 square. In particular, the silver on 77 is the quintessential characteristic that defines the Fortress. Most Fortress castle variants have this structure. The seventh file pawn must be pushed in order to make way for the silver.

When the king is moved into the castle, then it will be positioned on the 88 square although there are exceptions where the king remains outside the castle (on 68 or 69 or 79) or on a different square in some variants (such as on 78).

This basic form can occur in games when the player attacks early without extensive defensive preparations. For instance, the basic shape is usually formed in Bishop Exchange openings and this may be the only castle development in the faster attacking strategies such as Climbing Silver or Rushing Silver.

Simple Fortress
☖ pieces in hand: –

9	8	7	6	5	4	3	2	1
									1
	飛								2
		桂				角	歩		3
		歩				歩			4
							歩		5
		歩		歩		歩			6
歩	歩	銀	歩						7
		金	角				飛		8
香	桂								9

☗ pieces in hand: –

When used in the Fortress opening, a simple Fortress can be constructed with the S-77 G-78 formation and with the fifth file pawn typically pushed so that the bishop can be utilized early for counterattacking purposes (such as trading off the third file pawn, or exchanging the bishops off the board via P-24 Px24 Bx24 Bx24 Rx24 if the opponent's bishop is on 33, or by moving to 46 to attack the opponent's rook on 82 or to attack the opponent's jumped knight on 73 possibly with supporting a P*74 pawn drop or P-74 pawn push). This shape of Black's shown in the adjacent digram is actually found as transitional development in the Classic Fortress variation of the Fortress opening.

The sixth pawn file is often pushed to 66 although this is not always the case (for instance it is not always pushed in the Helmet Fortress in Bishop Exchange openings and in other cases it remains on 67 so that the left silver can move to 66).

Although these can be thought as the basic structure of the Fortress in the abstract, the most common form of the Fortress is the Gold Fortress.

== Gold Fortress ==
Gold Fortress (Black)
☖ pieces in hand: –

9	8	7	6	5	4	3	2	1
									1
									2
									3
									4
									5
		歩	歩	歩					6
歩	歩	銀	金						7
	玉	金							8
香	桂								9

☗ pieces in hand: –
Gold Fortress (White)
☖ pieces in hand: –

9	8	7	6	5	4	3	2	1
							桂	香	1
						金	王		2
					金	銀	歩	歩	3
				歩	歩	歩			4
									5
									6
									7
									8
									9

☗ pieces in hand: –

A common Fortress structure is the Gold Fortress (金矢倉 kin yagura), and usually when the term Fortress/矢倉 is used (especially in the Yagura opening), it implies that the variant referred to is the Gold Fortress. It has a strongly protected king and a well-fortified line of pawns. It is difficult to break down with a frontal assault, though it is weaker from the side. It is typically used against Static Rook openings that involve advancing the rook's pawn. However, one's opponent may just as easily adopt this defense, giving neither side an obvious advantage.

There is a good deal of flexibility in the order of moves when building the Fortress defense. A point to keep in mind is that the generals should move diagonally, not directly forward.

While forming the castle, the rook's pawn is often advanced two squares in preparation for a rook assault on the opposing king. Another common preparation is to advance the adjacent silver's pawn square, allowing passage for both the rook's silver and knight. These offensive moves are not properly part of the castle, but the two-square pawn advance must be carried out early if there is to be room for it, and so it is often done while still castling.

In the following three sections are possible typical developments of a Fortress castle in Double Fortress openings. The first are normal castle development sequences of nine moves. The last section shows the development of a Quick Fortress which is one move faster than usual methods.

However, the specific order of the castle move sequence will vary depending on White's piece development. Moreover, the castle usually isn't built all at once – rather, castle development is interwoven with the development of the attacking pieces. Additionally, moving the king all the way into the castle to the 88 square is not always optimal depending on the state and nature of White's attack.

=== Classic Fortress development (early S-77) ===
The development of the Gold Fortress castle in the Classic Fortress (旧矢倉) opening is shown below for Black. This is a 13-move sequence that is fairly typical.

Classic Fortress
☖ pieces in hand: –

9	8	7	6	5	4	3	2	1
									1
									2
									3
									4
									5
		歩							6
歩	歩		歩	歩	歩				7
	角								8
香	桂	銀	金	玉	金				9

☗ pieces in hand: –
(i) P-76
Classic Fortress
☖ pieces in hand: –

9	8	7	6	5	4	3	2	1
									1
									2
									3
									4
									5
		歩							6
歩	歩		歩	歩	歩				7
	角		銀						8
香	桂		金	玉	金				9

☗ pieces in hand: –
(ii) S-68
Classic Fortress
☖ pieces in hand: –

9	8	7	6	5	4	3	2	1
									1
									2
									3
									4
									5
		歩							6
歩	歩	銀	歩	歩	歩				7
	角								8
香	桂		金	玉	金				9

☗ pieces in hand: –
(iii) S-77
Classic Fortress
☖ pieces in hand: –

9	8	7	6	5	4	3	2	1
									1
									2
									3
									4
									5
		歩							6
歩	歩	銀	歩	歩	歩				7
	角	金							8
香	桂			玉	金				9

☗ pieces in hand: –
(iv) G-78

Classic Fortress
☖ pieces in hand: –

9	8	7	6	5	4	3	2	1
									1
									2
									3
									4
									5
		歩		歩					6
歩	歩	銀	歩		歩				7
	角	金							8
香	桂			玉	金				9

☗ pieces in hand: –
(v) P-56
Classic Fortress
☖ pieces in hand: –

9	8	7	6	5	4	3	2	1
									1
									2
									3
									4
									5
		歩		歩					6
歩	歩	銀	歩		歩				7
	角	金							8
香	桂		玉		金				9

☗ pieces in hand: –
(vi) K-59
Classic Fortress
☖ pieces in hand: –

9	8	7	6	5	4	3	2	1
									1
									2
									3
									4
									5
		歩		歩					6
歩	歩	銀	歩		歩				7
	角	金		金					8
香	桂		玉						9

☗ pieces in hand: –
(vii) G-78
Classic Fortress
☖ pieces in hand: –

9	8	7	6	5	4	3	2	1
									1
									2
									3
									4
									5
		歩		歩					6
歩	歩	銀	歩		歩				7
		金		金					8
香	桂	角	玉						9

☗ pieces in hand: –
(viii) B-79

Classic Fortress
24th Move Position
☖ pieces in hand: –

9	8	7	6	5	4	3	2	1
									1
									2
									3
									4
									5
		歩	歩	歩					6
歩	歩	銀			歩				7
		金		金					8
香	桂	角	玉						9

☗ pieces in hand: –
(ix) P-66

Classic Fortress
☖ pieces in hand: –

9	8	7	6	5	4	3	2	1
									1
									2
									3
									4
									5
		歩	歩	歩					6
歩	歩	銀	金		歩				7
		金							8
香	桂	角	玉						9

☗ pieces in hand: –
(x) G-67

Classic Fortress
☖ pieces in hand: –

9	8	7	6	5	4	3	2	1
									1
									2
									3
									4
									5
		歩	歩	歩					6
歩	歩	銀	金		歩				7
		金	角						8
香	桂		玉						9

☗ pieces in hand: –
(xi) B-68
(or B-57 or B-46 or B-35 or B-24)
Classic Fortress
☖ pieces in hand: –

9	8	7	6	5	4	3	2	1
									1
									2
									3
									4
									5
		歩	歩	歩					6
歩	歩	銀	金						7
		金	角						8
香	桂	玉							9

☗ pieces in hand: –
(xii) K-79

Classic Fortress
☖ pieces in hand: –

9	8	7	6	5	4	3	2	1
									1
									2
									3
									4
									5
		歩	歩	歩					6
歩	歩	銀	金						7
	玉	金	角						8
香	桂								9

☗ pieces in hand: –
(xiii) K-88

=== New Fortress development (early P-66) ===
The development of the Gold Fortress castle in the New Fortress (新矢倉) opening for Black is shown below. The New Fortress castle construction differs from the Classic Fortress construction starting from the player's third move.

New Fortress
☖ pieces in hand: –

9	8	7	6	5	4	3	2	1
									1
									2
									3
									4
									5
		歩							6
歩	歩		歩	歩	歩				7
	角								8
香	桂	銀	金	玉	金				9

☗ pieces in hand: –
(i) P-76
New Fortress
☖ pieces in hand: –

9	8	7	6	5	4	3	2	1
									1
									2
									3
									4
									5
		歩							6
歩	歩		歩	歩	歩				7
	角		銀						8
香	桂		金	玉	金				9

☗ pieces in hand: –
(ii) S-68
New Fortress
☖ pieces in hand: –

9	8	7	6	5	4	3	2	1
									1
									2
									3
									4
									5
		歩	歩						6
歩	歩			歩	歩				7
	角		銀						8
香	桂		金	玉	金				9

☗ pieces in hand: –
(iii) P-66
New Fortress
☖ pieces in hand: –

9	8	7	6	5	4	3	2	1
									1
									2
									3
									4
									5
		歩	歩	歩					6
歩	歩				歩				7
	角		銀						8
香	桂		金	玉	金				9

☗ pieces in hand: –
(iv) P-56

New Fortress
☖ pieces in hand: –

9	8	7	6	5	4	3	2	1
									1
									2
									3
									4
									5
		歩	歩	歩					6
歩	歩				歩				7
	角		銀	金					8
香	桂		金	玉					9

☗ pieces in hand: –
(v) G49-58
New Fortress (Crab castle)
☖ pieces in hand: –

9	8	7	6	5	4	3	2	1
									1
									2
									3
									4
									5
		歩	歩	歩					6
歩	歩				歩				7
	角	金	銀	金					8
香	桂			玉					9

☗ pieces in hand: –
(vi) G-68
New Fortress
☖ pieces in hand: –

9	8	7	6	5	4	3	2	1
									1
									2
									3
									4
									5
		歩	歩	歩					6
歩	歩				歩				7
	角	金	銀	金					8
香	桂		玉						9

☗ pieces in hand: –
(vii) K-69
New Fortress
☖ pieces in hand: –

9	8	7	6	5	4	3	2	1
									1
									2
									3
									4
									5
		歩	歩	歩					6
歩	歩		金		歩				7
	角	金	銀						8
香	桂		玉						9

☗ pieces in hand: –
(viii) G58-67

New Fortress
☖ pieces in hand: –

9	8	7	6	5	4	3	2	1
									1
									2
									3
									4
									5
		歩	歩	歩					6
歩	歩	銀	金		歩				7
	角	金							8
香	桂		玉						9

☗ pieces in hand: –
(ix) S-77

New Fortress
☖ pieces in hand: –

9	8	7	6	5	4	3	2	1
									1
									2
									3
									4
									5
		歩	歩	歩					6
歩	歩	銀	金		歩				7
		金							8
香	桂	角	玉						9

☗ pieces in hand: –
(x) B-79

New Fortress
☖ pieces in hand: –

9	8	7	6	5	4	3	2	1
									1
									2
									3
									4
									5
		歩	歩	歩					6
歩	歩	銀	金		歩				7
		金	角						8
香	桂		玉						9

☗ pieces in hand: –
(xi) B-68
(or B-57 or B-46 or B-35 or B-24)
New Fortress
☖ pieces in hand: –

9	8	7	6	5	4	3	2	1
									1
									2
									3
									4
									5
		歩	歩	歩					6
歩	歩	銀	金						7
		金	角						8
香	桂	玉							9

☗ pieces in hand: –
(xii) K-79

New Fortress
☖ pieces in hand: –

9	8	7	6	5	4	3	2	1
									1
									2
									3
									4
									5
		歩	歩	歩					6
歩	歩	銀	金						7
	玉	金	角						8
香	桂								9

☗ pieces in hand: –
(xiii) K-88

=== Quick Fortress development ===
Quick Castling
☖ pieces in hand: –

9	8	7	6	5	4	3	2	1
									1
									2
									3
									4
									5
		歩	歩	歩					6
歩	歩	銀	金		歩				7
	角								8
香	桂		金	玉					9

☗ pieces in hand: –
Quick Castling
☖ pieces in hand: –

9	8	7	6	5	4	3	2	1
									1
									2
									3
									4
									5
		歩	歩	歩					6
歩	歩	銀	金		歩				7
		玉							8
香	桂	角	金						9

☗ pieces in hand: –

Quick Castling
☖ pieces in hand: –

9	8	7	6	5	4	3	2	1
									1
									2
									3
									4
									5
		歩	歩	歩					6
歩	歩	銀	金		歩				7
	玉								8
香	桂	角	金						9

☗ pieces in hand: –
Quick Castling
☖ pieces in hand: –

9	8	7	6	5	4	3	2	1
									1
									2
									3
									4
									5
		歩	歩	歩					6
歩	歩	銀	金		歩				7
	玉	金							8
香	桂	角							9

☗ pieces in hand: –

Quick Fortress castle or Quick Fortress castling or Rapid Fortress castling (矢倉早囲い yagura hayagakoi) is a faster way of forming a Fortress castle than the standard way in that it saves one tempo. It is not a distinct castle but rather a method of castle construction.

Quick Fortress castling will lead to the intermediate position seen in the adjacent diagram. This intermediate position does not occur when a Fortress is built using the slower traditional move sequence.

(The term 早囲い hayagakoi also refers to the Quick castle, which is otherwise known as the Wall castle.)

=== Development from declined Bishop Exchange ===
Bishop Exchange Declined
☖ pieces in hand: –

9	8	7	6	5	4	3	2	1
香	桂	銀	金	王		銀	桂	香	1
	飛					金	角		2
歩		歩	歩	歩			歩	歩	3
					歩	歩			4
	歩								5
		歩					歩		6
歩	歩	角	歩	歩	歩	歩		歩	7
	銀	金					飛		8
香	桂			玉	金	銀	桂	香	9

☗ pieces in hand: –

A Fortress can be built from an initial Bishop Exchange configuration in which the opponent declines the usual bishop exchange.

=== Attacking Gold Fortress ===
A common attack against the Fortress defense is to advance the rook's knight directly forward, defended by the rook and with a pawn in hand, to attack the fortifications on either side of the castled king. If the defender has answered a lance's pawn advance on that side, a pawn may be dropped where the edge pawn had been. If the defending silver has moved or is not yet in position, a pawn may be dropped there.

== Variants ==
Although the Gold Fortress castle is very common, there are several variants of Fortress. Many of the variants are designed to address weakness in the Gold Fortress's structure under certain situations.

=== S-68 Gold Fortress ===
S-68 Variant
☖ pieces in hand: –

9	8	7	6	5	4	3	2	1
									1
									2
									3
									4
									5
		歩	歩	歩					6
歩	歩		金						7
	玉	金	銀						8
香	桂								9

☗ pieces in hand: –

Although the left silver is typically on the 77 square in the Gold Fortress. However, when being attacked with an opponent's Left Mino Right Fourth File Rook strategy, the silver on 77 will be attacked by the opponent's knight which jumps to 85 or 65. Since a silver–knight exchange is often not favorable, the silver remains on 68 where it is safe from attack and also defends the 57 square (in case of a knight to 65). This form also allows the left knight to capture/recapture on 77 as well as close the long diagonal that the opponent's bishop may be attacking on.

=== Tofu Fortress ===
Tofu Fortress
☖ pieces in hand: –

9	8	7	6	5	4	3	2	1
									1
									2
									3
									4
									5
	銀	歩	歩						6
歩	歩		金						7
	玉	金	角						8
香	桂								9

☗ pieces in hand: –

The Tofu Fortress (豆腐矢倉 tōfu yagura) is not a proper castle but rather a deformation of the Gold Fortress caused by the opponent's attack. Thus, this form occurs under inadequate preparation. The use of tofu is a metaphor of how easily this castle will fall apart like the soft silken tofu used in Japan.

Opponent's Attack
☖ pieces in hand: –

9	8	7	6	5	4	3	2	1
									1
			飛				角		2
									3
						歩			4
	桂		歩						5
	銀	歩	歩						6
歩	歩		金						7
	玉	金	角						8
香	桂								9

☗ pieces in hand: –

The Tofu Fortress develops from a Gold Fortress when the opponent attacks the Fortress's silver on 77 with a knight jump from 73 to 85. Since the silver–knight exchange is not favorable to Black, the silver escapes the attack by moving to 86. Unfortunately, this removes one piece that is closing the diagonal that the opponent's bishop is attacking. The second attacking move is the ...P-65 pawn. Black cannot capture this sixth file pawn with Px65 since their sixth file pawn on 66 is pinned by White's bishop. However, there are no other satisfactory responses. If Black does not capture the pawn, then ...Px66 attacks Black's right gold on 67. Moving the gold leftward with G-77 places the gold into White's knight attack. Moving the gold rightward with G-57 will be followed by ...Px66 which is threatening the P-67+ that will attack both of Black's golds and bishop and simultaneously give a discovered check on Black's king allowing White to capture either gold after Black resolves the check. Moving the king off the diagonal with K-79 still leaves an unfavorable state where ...Px66 will attack Black's gold again threatening P-67+ with a similar set of attacked pieces except now with a discovered attack on Black's left lance by White's bishop.

This type of Anti-Fortress attack occurs in Counter-Fortress Rapid Attack strategies, Left Mino Right Fourth File Rook, and some Snowroof positions.

=== Complete Fortress ===
Complete Fortress
☖ pieces in hand: –

9	8	7	6	5	4	3	2	1
									1
									2
									3
									4
									5
		歩	歩	歩					6
歩	歩	銀	金	銀					7
	玉	金							8
香	桂								9

☗ pieces in hand: –

The Complete Fortress (総矢倉 sōyagura) is called complete since it uses four generals instead of the usual three in which the right silver is positioned on the 57 square in Black's castle or the 53 square if White's castle. Since the player's silvers are on the same rank on 57 and 77 (Black's castle), the two silvers are prone to be forked by the opponent's knight via a ...P-65 Px65 Nx65 sequence.

Double Complete Fortress
Zugzwang-like position
☖ pieces in hand: –

9	8	7	6	5	4	3	2	1
香			飛				桂	香	1
						金	王		2
		桂		銀	金	銀	歩		3
歩	角	歩		歩	歩	歩		歩	4
	歩		歩		歩		歩		5
歩		歩	歩	歩		歩	角	歩	6
	歩	銀	金	銀		桂			7
	玉	金							8
香	桂				飛			香	9

☗ pieces in hand: –

==== Complete Fortress game examples ====
The joseki for the Double Complete Fortress can often lead to a repetition draw since both sides are felt to be in a zugzwang-like situation. Thus, it may be used purposely in order to strategically switch sides (since Repetition Draw outcomes lead to a new game being immediately replayed but with the player's sides reversed). Nonetheless, it is still possible to play a Double Complete Fortress game without a repetition draw.

Fujiuchi vs Fujikawa 1951
☖ pieces in hand: –

9	8	7	6	5	4	3	2	1
香	桂						桂	香	1
	飛					金	王		2
			歩	銀	金	銀	歩		3
		歩	角	歩	歩	歩		歩	4
歩	歩						歩		5
		歩	歩	歩	歩	歩		歩	6
歩	歩	銀	金	銀		角			7
	玉	金					飛		8
香	桂						桂	香	9

☗ pieces in hand: –
Kingo Fujiuchi vs Yoshio Fujikawa 1951 January

The 1976 May 13 Meijin game between Kunio Yonenaga and Makoto Nakahara is an example of such a game.

=== Silver Fortress ===
Silver Fortress
☖ pieces in hand: –

9	8	7	6	5	4	3	2	1
									1
									2
									3
									4
									5
		歩	歩	歩					6
歩	歩	銀	銀						7
	玉	金							8
香	桂								9

☗ pieces in hand: –

A Silver Fortress (銀矢倉 gin yagura) uses a silver on 67 instead of a gold. This allows for defending of the gold on 78, which is only defended by the king in a Gold Fortress. Silver Fortress allows for greater flexibility with two silvers on rank 7. In a Gold Fortress, if the silver on 77 moves to 76, it is not able to return 77, and if the gold on 67 moves to 76, it can't move back to 77. Using two silvers on 77 and 67 allows for the same range of defense on 86, 76, 66, and 56 as well as the greater potential of both silvers returning to 77 and 67 after moving up to rank 6. However, by using a second silver for the castle, one gives up the use of the silver for offensive purposes and the side of silver (57) is not defended.

==== Silver Fortress game example ====
Watanabe vs Inaba 2019
☖ pieces in hand: 角

9	8	7	6	5	4	3	2	1
香	飛					王	桂	香	1
			金			金			2
		桂		歩		銀	歩		3
歩		歩	歩	銀	歩	歩		歩	4
	歩						歩		5
歩		歩	歩	歩	歩	歩		歩	6
	歩	銀	銀			桂			7
	玉	金			金				8
香	桂						飛	香	9

☗ pieces in hand: 角
after 46 moves.

A game of Akira Watanabe vs Akira Inaba in April 2019 shows an example of a Silver Fortress. The opening was Bishop Exchange, Double Reclining Silver, P25 G48 R29 variation. Both players first built a Helmet castle as is typical of Bishop Exchange games. After this, Inaba (White) used the currently popular tactic of waiting for Black to start the attack by playing waiting moves. This gave Watanabe (Black) the time to develop his Helmet castle into a Silver Fortress by pushing his sixth file pawn (P-66), moving his reclined silver from 56 to 66, moving his king into the castle (K-79, K-88), and pushing the central pawn (P-56).

=== Incomplete Fortress ===
Incomplete Fortress
☖ pieces in hand: –

9	8	7	6	5	4	3	2	1
									1
									2
									3
									4
									5
		歩	歩						6
歩	歩	銀	金						7
		玉	金						8
香	桂								9

☗ pieces in hand: –

An Incomplete Fortress or Half Fortress (片矢倉 kata yagura) has the king and the gold on 78 and 68, respectively, instead of the positions 88 and 78 as in the usual Fortress castles. This positioning is meant to protect from the opponent's bishop being dropped onto 69 or 59 (highlighted in diagram) after a bishop exchange as now the gold on 68 is defended by the silver on 77 and the gold on 67 and the gold on 68 can attack 69. In a Gold Fortress, the gold on 68 is not defended by any piece besides the king, and it cannot attack a bishop that was dropped on 69. An Incomplete Fortress is also known as Amano's Fortress (天野矢倉), named after Edo period shogi master Sōfu Amano.

=== Helmet Fortress ===
Helmet Fortress
☖ pieces in hand: 角

9	8	7	6	5	4	3	2	1
									1
									2
									3
									4
									5
歩		歩							6
	歩	銀	歩	歩					7
		金		金					8
香	桂	玉							9

☗ pieces in hand: 角

The Helmet Fortress (兜矢倉 kabuto yagura) or simply Helmet or Headpiece (カブト kabuto) castle is a variant used in Bishop Exchange games especially in Reclining Silver variations where there is more defensive development before the players start their attacks.

The king can be moved fully into the castle on the 88 square but often it remains outside the castle on 79 or 68 (or more rarely 69).

The right gold is typically not moved up to 67 but remains on 58 so that it can defend more widely against the opponent's bishop drops. There is even a variant in which the right gold is positioned on 48 so that it defends an even wider area.

The edge pawn is often pushed to P-96 especially in the Reclining Silver variations.

As a result of the right gold remaining on rank 8, the sixth file pawn is often not pushed to 66. In the Reclining Silver variations of Bishop Exchange, some subvariations do move the 66 so that it may capture the opponent's pawn on that file (with ...P-65 Px65). However, in some subvariations, the P-66 pawn may not be considered advantageous.

A Helmet Fortress can be developed into a Dented Fortress by moving the right gold to 68.

Helmet Fortress, Reclining Silver
☖ pieces in hand: 角

9	8	7	6	5	4	3	2	1
									1
									2
									3
									4
									5
歩		歩	歩	銀	歩				6
	歩	銀		歩					7
	玉	金		金					8
香	桂								9

☗ pieces in hand: 角

In a Reclining Silver variation with P-66, the reclined right silver on 56 can possibly be moved to 67 to develop into a Silver Fortress.

=== Dented Fortress ===
Dented Fortress
☖ pieces in hand: –

9	8	7	6	5	4	3	2	1
									1
									2
									3
									4
									5
		歩							6
歩	歩	銀	歩	歩					7
	玉	金	金						8
香	桂								9

☗ pieces in hand: –

Dented Fortress or Hollow Fortress (へこみ矢倉 or 凹み矢倉 hekomi yagura)

The Dented Fortress is often in Bishop Exchange openings as a development from the Helmet Yagura castle.

It is typically used by White in the Double Reclining Silver variations of that opening.

The sixth file (or fourth file for White) pawn can also be pushed so that this castle can be developed into a Gold Fortress.

=== Doi's Fortress ===
Doi's Fortress
☖ pieces in hand: –

9	8	7	6	5	4	3	2	1
									1
									2
									3
									4
									5
歩		歩	歩	歩					6
	歩	銀	金						7
		玉		金					8
香	桂								9

☗ pieces in hand: –

Doi vs Kimura 1940
☖ pieces in hand: 角

9	8	7	6	5	4	3	2	1
香	桂						桂	香	1
	飛					金	王		2
			歩	銀	金	銀	歩		3
歩		歩		歩	歩	歩		歩	4
	歩						歩		5
歩		歩	歩	歩	歩	歩			6
	歩	銀	金		銀	桂		歩	7
		玉		金			飛		8
香	桂							香	9

☗ pieces in hand: 角
Takami vs Kanai 2018
☖ pieces in hand: –

9	8	7	6	5	4	3	2	1
香	桂						桂	香	1
	飛			金		金	王		2
		角	歩	銀		銀	歩	歩	3
歩	歩	歩		歩	歩	歩			4
							歩		5
歩		歩	歩	歩	歩	歩			6
	歩	銀	金			桂		歩	7
		玉		金	銀				8
香	桂	角					飛	香	9

☗ pieces in hand: –

Doi's Fortress (土居矢倉 Doi yagura) is a Fortress variant that was invented by Ichitarō Doi (土居市太郎) who used the structure in a 1940 Meijin title tournament. Its unique feature is having the left gold move up to the 67 square instead of the usual right gold moving to 67 and the right gold remains on 58.

This variant is not as strong as the Gold Fortress; however, it does protect more widely within the player's camp which can be important if the opponent's bishop if off the board. (Note is this the same reasoning used for the Incomplete Fortress where the left gold is more central on 68 instead of 78 and the Helmet Fortress used in Bishop Exchange games with its right gold on 58 or 68.)

The castle was recently prominently used by Taichi Takami in a 2018 Eiō title tournament.

=== Floating Chrysanthemum Fortress ===
Floating Chrysanthemum Fortress
☖ pieces in hand: –

9	8	7	6	5	4	3	2	1
									1
									2
									3
									4
									5
		歩	歩	歩					6
歩	歩	桂	金						7
	銀	金							8
香	玉								9

☗ pieces in hand: –

Floating Chrysanthemum Fortress or Kikusui Fortress or (菊水矢倉 kikusui yagura)

=== Diamond Fortress ===
Diamond Fortress
☖ pieces in hand: –

9	8	7	6	5	4	3	2	1
									1
									2
									3
									4
			歩						5
		歩	銀	歩					6
歩	歩	銀	金						7
	玉	金							8
香	桂								9

☗ pieces in hand: –

Diamond Fortress or Lozenge Fortress (菱矢倉 hishi yagura)

=== High Silver Fortress ===
High Silver Fortress
☖ pieces in hand: –

9	8	7	6	5	4	3	2	1
									1
									2
									3
									4
		歩							5
		銀	歩	歩					6
歩	歩		金						7
	玉	金							8
香	桂								9

☗ pieces in hand: –

High Silver Fortress or Silver Standing Fortress (銀立ち矢倉 gintachi yagura)

The High Silver Fortress is used in the King's Head Vanguard Pawn strategy, which is a Counter-Ranging Rook position.

=== Fortress Anaguma ===
Fortress Anaguma
☖ pieces in hand: –

9	8	7	6	5	4	3	2	1
									1
									2
									3
									4
									5
		歩	歩	歩					6
歩	歩	銀	金						7
香		金							8
玉	桂								9

☗ pieces in hand: –

Fortress Anaguma (矢倉穴熊)

=== Square Fortress ===
Silver Square Fortress
☖ pieces in hand: –

9	8	7	6	5	4	3	2	1
									1
									2
									3
									4
									5
		歩	歩	歩					6
歩	歩	銀	銀						7
	玉	金	金						8
香	桂								9

☗ pieces in hand: –

The Square Fortress variant (四角矢倉 shikaku yagura) has an arrangement of all four general in a 2x2 square shape. There are two subvariants: a Gold Square Fortress and a Silver Square Fortress.

The Silver Square Fortress is structurally similar to the Silver Fortress (silvers on 77 and 67), the Incomplete Fortress (gold on 68), and the Big Four castle (which also has this same square silver-silver and gold-gold arrangement). This castle is very strong. Firstly, a bishop is unable to drop to the yellow squares which are possible with a Gold Fortress. Secondly, 57 is protected by the 68 gold. Thirdly, the 76 and 66 squares are not weak points. But, it is dangerous if attacked on the left edge.

Gold Square Fortress
☖ pieces in hand: –

9	8	7	6	5	4	3	2	1
									1
									2
									3
									4
									5
		歩	歩	歩					6
歩	歩	銀	金						7
	玉	金	銀						8
香	桂								9

☗ pieces in hand: –

The other related form is the Gold Square Fortress. This uses the same 2x2 four general square shape but has the typical gold on the 67 square as in the Gold Fortress. A silver is placed on 68 to complete the square.

=== Straight Line Fortress ===
Straight Line Fortress
☖ pieces in hand: –

9	8	7	6	5	4	3	2	1
									1
									2
									3
									4
									5
		歩	歩	歩	歩				6
歩	歩	銀	金	銀	金				7
		玉							8
香	桂								9

☗ pieces in hand: –

Straight Line Fortress (一文字矢倉 ichi monji yagura)

=== Right Fortress ===
Right Fortress
☖ pieces in hand: –

9	8	7	6	5	4	3	2	1
									1
									2
									3
									4
									5
				歩	歩	歩			6
					金	銀	歩	歩	7
						金	玉		8
							桂	香	9

☗ pieces in hand: –

A Right Fortress or Right-Hand Fortress (右矢倉 migi yagura) is a Fortress castle built on the right side of the board instead of the traditional left side.

A Right Fortress may be useful in Double Ranging Rook positions since the Fortress structure is strong against attacks from above.

A demerit of Right Fortress is that it requires several moves to create (compared to other Ranging Rook castles like Mino castle).

A Mino castle may transition into a Right Fortress.

== Relations with other castles ==
=== Crab castle ===
Crab
☖ pieces in hand: –

9	8	7	6	5	4	3	2	1
									1
									2
									3
									4
									5
		歩		歩					6
歩	歩		歩						7
	角	金	銀	金	銀				8
香	桂		玉						9

☗ pieces in hand: –

When building a Fortress castle, there is a strong intermediate position called the Crab castle (カニ囲い kani gakoi). It has the three pawns on the left side advanced to their final Fortress positions, and on rank 8 all four generals are lined up next to the bishop, which is still in its starting position: 角金銀金銀 bishop-gold-silver-gold-silver. The king is moved one square to the left, behind the middle silver.

The crab name comes from the way the king at 69 can only move from side to side (79, 59).

=== Snowroof castle ===
In some variations (especially older pre-1960s theory) of the Snowroof opening, the Snowroof may be developed into a Silver Fortress.

=== Mino castle ===
A Mino castle may be developed into Right Fortress.

== See also ==
- Fortress opening
- Castle (shogi)

== Bibliography ==
- Aono, Teruichi (2009) [First published in 1983]. Better Moves for Better Shogi. Translated by Fairbairn, John (2nd ed.). Ishi Press. ISBN 978-4-87187-999-6.
- Aono, Teruichi (1983). Guide to shogi openings: Unlock the secrets of joseki 将棋定跡のカギ: 和英 定跡問題集. Translated by Fairbairn, John. 山海堂. ISBN 4-381-00598-8.
- Fairbairn, John (1984). Shogi for Beginners. Ishi Press. ISBN 978-4-8718-720-10.
- Hodges, George (ed.) 1976–1987. Shogi Magazine. The Shogi Association.
- Hosking, Tony (1996). The art of shogi. The Shogi Foundation. ISBN 978-0-95310-890-9.
- Kaneko, Takashi (2003). Storming the Mino Castle 200. Translated by Sams, Richard. Nekomado. ISBN 978-4905225058.
- Kitao, Madoka (2012). Edge attack at a glance. Translated by Kawasaki, Tomohide. Nekomado. ISBN 978-4-9052-2502-7.
- Kitao, Madoka (2014). Ending attack at a glance. Translated by Kawasaki, Tomohide. Nekomado. ISBN 978-4-9052-2513-3.
- 大平, 武洋 (2016). 矢倉囲いを極める77の手筋. マイナビ出版.
