= Kiyokazu Katsumata =

Japanese shogi player

- Native name: 勝又清和
- Born: March 21, 1969 (age 56)
- Hometown: Zama, Kanagawa

Career
- Achieved professional status: April 1, 1995 (aged 26)
- Badge Number: 215
- Rank: 7-dan
- Teacher: Kazuo Ishida (9-dan)
- Meijin class: Free
- Ryūō class: 6

Websites
- JSA profile page
- Kiyokazu Katsumata on Twitter

Kiyokazu Katsumata (勝又 清和, Katsumata Kiyokazu; born March 21, 1969) is a Japanese professional shogi player ranked 7-dan.

== Early life, amateur shogi and apprenticeship ==
Katsumata was born on March 21, 1969, in Zama, Kanagawa. As a junior high school student, Katsumata won the 8th Junior High School Student Meijin Tournament in 1983. Later that same year, he was accepted into the Japan Shogi Association's apprentice school at the rank of 6-kyū as a student of shogi professional Kazuo Ishida. He was promoted to amateur professional 1-dan in 1986 and was awarded full professional status and the corresponding rank of 4-dan in April 1995.

== Shogi professional ==
=== Promotion history ===
The promotion history for Katsumata is as follows:

- 6-kyū: 1983
- 1-dan: 1986
- 4-dan: April 1, 1995
- 5-dan: April 1, 1999
- 6-dan: March 13, 2007
- 7-dan: April 1, 2020
