= Double Fortress =

Shogi opening

Double Fortress
☖ pieces in hand: –

9	8	7	6	5	4	3	2	1
香							桂	香	1
	飛		銀			金	王		2
		桂	歩		金	銀	歩	歩	3
	歩	歩	角	歩	歩	歩			4
歩								歩	5
		歩	歩	歩		歩	歩		6
歩	歩	銀	金		歩	銀			7
	玉	金	角				飛		8
香	桂						桂	香	9

☗ pieces in hand: –
Hifumi Katō vs Sōta Fujii 2016 after 38 moves

The Double Fortress (相矢倉 or 相櫓 aiyagura) is a shogi opening in which both players construct Fortress formations.

Double Fortress games are the most common type of Fortress games found at all levels of play.

== Historical Fortress ==
Earlier josekis for Fortress in the Edo period (usually spelled 櫓 at that time) were very different from the current josekis.

In one variation, White delays pushing their rook pawn (whereas Black delays the rook pawn push in the modern era) and there is an early bishop trade before both players' kings are moved into their castles.

In the 1947 Meijin tournament, Masao Tsukada and Yoshio Kimura played an early example of the typical 3. S-77 type of Fortress with 1.P-76 P-84 development found in modern shogi.

Tsukada vs Kimura 1947
up to move 14
☖ pieces in hand: –

9	8	7	6	5	4	3	2	1
香	桂		金	王	金		桂	香	1
	飛		銀				角		2
歩		歩	歩		歩	銀	歩	歩	3
				歩		歩			4
	歩						歩		5
		歩		歩					6
歩	歩	銀	歩		歩	歩		歩	7
	角				銀		飛		8
香	桂		金	玉	金		桂	香	9

☗ pieces in hand: –
1. P-76 P-84

2. S-78 P-34
3. S-77 S-62
4. P-26 S-42
5. P-25 S-33
6. S-48 P-85

7. P-56 P-54

== 1. P-76 P-84 development ==
(Gold) Fortress Castle
☖ pieces in hand: –

9	8	7	6	5	4	3	2	1
									1
									2
									3
									4
									5
		歩	歩	歩					6
歩	歩	銀	金						7
	玉	金							8
香	桂								9

☗ pieces in hand: –
Fortress
up to move 2
☖ pieces in hand: –

9	8	7	6	5	4	3	2	1
香	桂	銀	金	王	金	銀	桂	香	1
	飛						角		2
歩		歩	歩	歩	歩	歩	歩	歩	3
	歩								4
									5
		歩							6
歩	歩		歩	歩	歩	歩	歩	歩	7
	角						飛		8
香	桂	銀	金	玉	金	銀	桂	香	9

☗ pieces in hand: –
1. P-76 P-84

Fortress
up to move 3
☖ pieces in hand: –

9	8	7	6	5	4	3	2	1
香	桂	銀	金	王	金	銀	桂	香	1
	飛						角		2
歩		歩	歩	歩	歩	歩	歩	歩	3
	歩								4
									5
		歩							6
歩	歩		歩	歩	歩	歩	歩	歩	7
	角		銀				飛		8
香	桂		金	玉	金	銀	桂	香	9

☗ pieces in hand: –
2. S-68
Fortress
up to move 4
☖ pieces in hand: –

9	8	7	6	5	4	3	2	1
香	桂	銀	金	王	金	銀	桂	香	1
	飛						角		2
歩		歩	歩	歩	歩		歩	歩	3
	歩					歩			4
									5
		歩							6
歩	歩		歩	歩	歩	歩	歩	歩	7
	角		銀				飛		8
香	桂		金	玉	金	銀	桂	香	9

☗ pieces in hand: –
2. ...P-34

=== 3. S-77: Blocking bishop with silver ===
Fortress
up to move 5
☖ pieces in hand: –

9	8	7	6	5	4	3	2	1
香	桂	銀	金	王	金	銀	桂	香	1
	飛						角		2
歩		歩	歩	歩	歩		歩	歩	3
	歩					歩			4
									5
		歩							6
歩	歩	銀	歩	歩	歩	歩	歩	歩	7
	角						飛		8
香	桂		金	玉	金	銀	桂	香	9

☗ pieces in hand: –
3. S-77

Blocking White's bishop with a silver (and also defending the eighth file from a possible attack) is an older Fortress joseki, which typically also includes advancing Black's rook pawn.

The more recent joseki advances Black's pawn on the sixth file instead. (See above.)

==== Classic Fortress 24-Move Set ====
Classic Fortress
up to move 24
☖ pieces in hand: –

9	8	7	6	5	4	3	2	1
香	桂				王	角	桂	香	1
	飛		銀	金		金			2
歩			歩			銀	歩	歩	3
	歩	歩		歩	歩	歩			4
									5
		歩	歩	歩		歩	歩		6
歩	歩	銀			歩			歩	7
		金		金	銀		飛		8
香	桂	角	玉				桂	香	9

☗ pieces in hand: –

Classic Fortress 24-Move Set (旧矢倉24手組 kyū yagura nijū-tegumi)

Compared to the New Fortress 24-Move Set, note that the Classic Fortress 24-Move Set is (a) symmetrical where both sides have the same formation and (b) that only Black's formation differs (White's formation is the same in both the old and new josekis.)

===== Right Gold to 67 variant =====
Right Gold to 67
up to move 25
☖ pieces in hand: –

9	8	7	6	5	4	3	2	1
香	桂				王	角	桂	香	1
	飛		銀	金		金			2
歩			歩			銀	歩	歩	3
	歩	歩		歩	歩	歩			4
									5
		歩	歩	歩		歩	歩		6
歩	歩	銀	金		歩			歩	7
		金			銀		飛		8
香	桂	角	玉				桂	香	9

☗ pieces in hand: –
25. G58-67
Right Gold to 67
up to move 26
☖ pieces in hand: –

9	8	7	6	5	4	3	2	1
香	桂				王	角	桂	香	1
	飛		銀			金			2
歩			歩		金	銀	歩	歩	3
	歩	歩		歩	歩	歩			4
									5
		歩	歩	歩		歩	歩		6
歩	歩	銀	金		歩			歩	7
		金			銀		飛		8
香	桂	角	玉				桂	香	9

☗ pieces in hand: –
25. ...G52-43

Right Gold To 67 (6七金右 roku-nana kin migi)

===== Spearing the Sparrow =====
Spearing the Sparrow
up to move 25
☖ pieces in hand: –

9	8	7	6	5	4	3	2	1
香	桂				王	角	桂	香	1
	飛		銀	金		金			2
歩			歩			銀	歩	歩	3
	歩	歩		歩	歩	歩			4
									5
		歩	歩	歩		歩	歩	歩	6
歩	歩	銀			歩				7
		金		金	銀		飛		8
香	桂	角	玉				桂	香	9

☗ pieces in hand: –
25. P-16

Spearing the Sparrow (雀刺し suzume-zashi)

=== 3. P-66: Blocking bishop with pawn ===
Fortress
up to move 5
☖ pieces in hand: –

9	8	7	6	5	4	3	2	1
香	桂	銀	金	王	金	銀	桂	香	1
	飛						角		2
歩		歩	歩	歩	歩		歩	歩	3
	歩					歩			4
									5
		歩	歩						6
歩	歩			歩	歩	歩	歩	歩	7
	角		銀				飛		8
香	桂		金	玉	金	銀	桂	香	9

☗ pieces in hand: –
3. P-66
Fortress
up to move 6
☖ pieces in hand:

9	8	7	6	5	4	3	2	1
香	桂		金	王	金	銀	桂	香	1
	飛		銀				角		2
歩		歩	歩	歩	歩		歩	歩	3
	歩					歩			4
									5
		歩	歩	歩					6
歩	歩				歩	歩	歩	歩	7
	角		銀				飛		8
香	桂		金	玉	金	銀	桂	香	9

☗ pieces in hand: –
3. ...S-62

At move 6, White also has an option to play Climbing Silver by advancing their rook pawn to rank 5. (See: White Climbing Silver.)

Fortress
up to move 7
☖ pieces in hand: –

9	8	7	6	5	4	3	2	1
香	桂		金	王	金	銀	桂	香	1
	飛		銀				角		2
歩		歩	歩	歩	歩		歩	歩	3
	歩					歩			4
									5
		歩	歩	歩					6
歩	歩				歩	歩	歩	歩	7
	角		銀				飛		8
香	桂		金	玉	金	銀	桂	香	9

☗ pieces in hand: –
4. P-56

Fortress
up to move 10
☖ pieces in hand: –

9	8	7	6	5	4	3	2	1
香	桂		金	王	金		桂	香	1
	飛		銀		銀		角		2
歩		歩	歩		歩		歩	歩	3
	歩			歩		歩			4
									5
		歩	歩	歩					6
歩	歩				歩	歩	歩	歩	7
	角		銀		銀		飛		8
香	桂		金	玉	金		桂	香	9

☗ pieces in hand: –
4. ...P-54
5. S-48 S-42

Fortress
up to move 11
☖ pieces in hand: –

9	8	7	6	5	4	3	2	1
香	桂		金	王	金		桂	香	1
	飛		銀		銀		角		2
歩		歩	歩		歩		歩	歩	3
	歩			歩		歩			4
									5
		歩	歩	歩					6
歩	歩				歩	歩	歩	歩	7
	角		銀	金	銀		飛		8
香	桂		金	玉			桂	香	9

☗ pieces in hand: –
6. G49-58

Fortress
up to move 14
☖ pieces in hand: –

9	8	7	6	5	4	3	2	1
香	桂		金		王		桂	香	1
	飛		銀		銀	金	角		2
歩		歩	歩		歩		歩	歩	3
	歩			歩		歩			4
									5
		歩	歩	歩					6
歩	歩				歩	歩	歩	歩	7
	角	金	銀	金	銀		飛		8
香	桂			玉			桂	香	9

☗ pieces in hand: –
6. ...G-32
7. G-78 K-41

Fortress
up to move 15
☖ pieces in hand: –

9	8	7	6	5	4	3	2	1
香	桂		金		王		桂	香	1
	飛		銀		銀	金	角		2
歩		歩	歩		歩		歩	歩	3
	歩			歩		歩			4
									5
		歩	歩	歩					6
歩	歩				歩	歩	歩	歩	7
	角	金	銀	金	銀		飛		8
香	桂		玉				桂	香	9

☗ pieces in hand: –
8. K-69
Crab Castle
☖ pieces in hand: –

9	8	7	6	5	4	3	2	1
									1
									2
									3
									4
									5
		歩	歩	歩					6
歩	歩								7
	角	金	銀	金					8
香	桂		玉						9

☗ pieces in hand: –

==== New Fortress 24-Move Set ====
Fortress
up to move 24
☖ pieces in hand: –

9	8	7	6	5	4	3	2	1
香	桂				王	角	桂	香	1
	飛		銀	金		金			2
歩			歩			銀	歩	歩	3
	歩	歩		歩	歩	歩			4
									5
		歩	歩	歩		歩			6
歩	歩	銀	金		歩		歩	歩	7
		金			銀		飛		8
香	桂	角	玉				桂	香	9

☗ pieces in hand: –

New Fortress 24-Move Set (新矢倉24手組 shin yagura nijū-tegumi)

=== Quick Fortress castling ===
Fujii Quick castling
☖ pieces in hand: –

9	8	7	6	5	4	3	2	1
香	桂		金	王			桂	香	1
	飛		銀		銀	金	角		2
歩		歩	歩		歩		歩	歩	3
	歩			歩		歩			4
									5
		歩	歩	歩					6
歩	歩		金		歩	歩	歩	歩	7
	角		銀		銀		飛		8
香	桂		金	玉			桂	香	9

☗ pieces in hand: –
Fujii Quick castling
☖ pieces in hand: –

9	8	7	6	5	4	3	2	1
香	桂		金		王		桂	香	1
	飛		銀		銀	金	角		2
歩		歩	歩		歩		歩	歩	3
	歩			歩		歩			4
									5
		歩	歩	歩			歩		6
歩	歩		金		歩	歩		歩	7
	角		銀		銀		飛		8
香	桂		金	玉			桂	香	9

☗ pieces in hand: –

Fujii Quick castling
☖ pieces in hand: –

9	8	7	6	5	4	3	2	1
香	桂		金		王		桂	香	1
	飛		銀		銀	金	角		2
歩			歩		歩		歩	歩	3
	歩	歩		歩		歩			4
							歩		5
		歩	歩	歩					6
歩	歩		金		歩	歩		歩	7
	角		銀		銀		飛		8
香	桂		金	玉			桂	香	9

☗ pieces in hand: –
Fujii Quick castling
☖ pieces in hand: –

9	8	7	6	5	4	3	2	1
香	桂		金		王		桂	香	1
	飛		銀			金	角		2
歩			歩		歩	銀	歩	歩	3
	歩	歩		歩		歩			4
							歩		5
		歩	歩	歩					6
歩	歩	銀	金		歩	歩		歩	7
	角				銀		飛		8
香	桂		金	玉			桂	香	9

☗ pieces in hand: –

Fujii Quick castling
☖ pieces in hand: –

9	8	7	6	5	4	3	2	1
香	桂		金		王	角	桂	香	1
	飛		銀			金			2
歩			歩		歩	銀	歩	歩	3
	歩	歩		歩		歩			4
							歩		5
		歩	歩	歩					6
歩	歩	銀	金		歩	歩		歩	7
					銀		飛		8
香	桂	角	金	玉			桂	香	9

☗ pieces in hand: –
Fujii Quick castling
☖ pieces in hand: –

9	8	7	6	5	4	3	2	1
香	桂				王	角	桂	香	1
	飛		銀	金		金			2
歩			歩		歩	銀	歩	歩	3
	歩	歩		歩		歩			4
							歩		5
		歩	歩	歩		歩			6
歩	歩	銀	金		歩			歩	7
					銀		飛		8
香	桂	角	金	玉			桂	香	9

☗ pieces in hand: –

Fujii Quick castling
☖ pieces in hand: –

9	8	7	6	5	4	3	2	1
香	桂				王	角	桂	香	1
	飛		銀	金		金			2
歩			歩			銀	歩	歩	3
	歩	歩		歩	歩	歩			4
							歩		5
		歩	歩	歩		歩			6
歩	歩	銀	金		歩			歩	7
					銀		飛		8
香	桂	角	金	玉			桂	香	9

☗ pieces in hand: –
Fujii Quick castling
☖ pieces in hand: –

9	8	7	6	5	4	3	2	1
香	桂				王	角	桂	香	1
	飛		銀			金			2
歩			歩		金	銀	歩	歩	3
	歩	歩		歩	歩	歩			4
							歩		5
		歩	歩	歩		歩			6
歩	歩	銀	金		歩	銀		歩	7
							飛		8
香	桂	角	金	玉			桂	香	9

☗ pieces in hand: –

Fujii Quick castling
☖ pieces in hand: –

9	8	7	6	5	4	3	2	1
香	桂				王	角	桂	香	1
	飛		銀			金			2
歩			歩		金	銀	歩	歩	3
	歩	歩		歩	歩	歩			4
							歩		5
		歩	歩	歩		歩			6
歩	歩	銀	金		歩	銀		歩	7
			玉				飛		8
香	桂	角	金				桂	香	9

☗ pieces in hand: –

Quick Fortress castling

=== White's Fortress Climbing Silver ===
White Climbing Silver
up to move 6
☖ pieces in hand: –

9	8	7	6	5	4	3	2	1
香	桂	銀	金	王	金	銀	桂	香	1
	飛						角		2
歩		歩	歩	歩	歩		歩	歩	3
						歩			4
	歩								5
		歩	歩	歩					6
歩	歩				歩	歩	歩	歩	7
	角		銀				飛		8
香	桂		金	玉	金	銀	桂	香	9

☗ pieces in hand: –
3. ...P-85
White Climbing Silver
up to move 7
☖ pieces in hand: –

9	8	7	6	5	4	3	2	1
香	桂	銀	金	王	金	銀	桂	香	1
	飛						角		2
歩		歩	歩	歩	歩		歩	歩	3
						歩			4
	歩								5
		歩	歩	歩					6
歩	歩	銀			歩	歩	歩	歩	7
	角						飛		8
香	桂		金	玉	金	銀	桂	香	9

☗ pieces in hand: –
4. S-77

=== Silver-37 variations ===
S-37
☖ pieces in hand: –

9	8	7	6	5	4	3	2	1
香	桂				王	角	桂	香	1
	飛		銀	金		金			2
歩			歩			銀	歩	歩	3
	歩	歩		歩	歩	歩			4
									5
		歩	歩	歩		歩			6
歩	歩	銀	金		歩	銀	歩	歩	7
		金					飛		8
香	桂	角	玉				桂	香	9

☗ pieces in hand: –
13. S-37
White's usual response
☖ pieces in hand: –

9	8	7	6	5	4	3	2	1
香	桂				王		桂	香	1
	飛		銀	金		金			2
歩			歩			銀	歩	歩	3
	歩	歩	角	歩	歩	歩			4
									5
		歩	歩	歩		歩			6
歩	歩	銀	金		歩	銀	歩	歩	7
		金					飛		8
香	桂	角	玉				桂	香	9

☗ pieces in hand: –
13. ...B-64

After the 24-move set of the Fortress opening, one major branch in the Fortress strategies is the Silver-37 set of variations. Many variations are under this parent variation.

==== Katō variation ====
Bishop moves for king
☖ pieces in hand: –

9	8	7	6	5	4	3	2	1
香	桂				王		桂	香	1
	飛		銀	金		金			2
歩			歩			銀	歩	歩	3
	歩	歩	角	歩	歩	歩			4
									5
		歩	歩	歩		歩			6
歩	歩	銀	金		歩	銀	歩	歩	7
		金	角				飛		8
香	桂		玉				桂	香	9

☗ pieces in hand: –
14. B-68

Castle construction
☖ pieces in hand: –

9	8	7	6	5	4	3	2	1
香	桂					王	桂	香	1
	飛		銀			金			2
歩			歩		金	銀	歩	歩	3
	歩	歩	角	歩	歩	歩			4
									5
		歩	歩	歩		歩			6
歩	歩	銀	金		歩	銀	歩	歩	7
		金	角				飛		8
香	桂	玉					桂	香	9

☗ pieces in hand: –
14. ...G-43
15. K-79 K-31

Castle construction
☖ pieces in hand: –

9	8	7	6	5	4	3	2	1
香	桂						桂	香	1
	飛		銀			金	王		2
歩			歩		金	銀	歩	歩	3
	歩	歩	角	歩	歩	歩			4
									5
		歩	歩	歩		歩			6
歩	歩	銀	金		歩	銀	歩	歩	7
	玉	金	角				飛		8
香	桂						桂	香	9

☗ pieces in hand: –
16. K-88 K-22

Pawn advances
☖ pieces in hand: –

9	8	7	6	5	4	3	2	1
香	桂						桂	香	1
	飛		銀			金	王		2
歩			歩		金	銀	歩	歩	3
		歩	角	歩	歩	歩			4
	歩								5
		歩	歩	歩		歩	歩	歩	6
歩	歩	銀	金		歩	銀			7
	玉	金	角				飛		8
香	桂						桂	香	9

☗ pieces in hand: –
17. P-16 P-85
18. P-25

Named after Hifumi Katō.

=== Morishita System ===
The Morishita System delays moving the right attacking silver to 37 early. Instead, it simply moves the bishop to 68 allowing the king to move into the Fortress castle in subsequent moves.

== Other development patterns ==
=== 1. P-76 P-34 2. P-66 patterns ===
Additionally, earlier Fortress openings in the first part of the 20th century did not follow from the standard 1. P-76 P-84 opening used today and instead developed from mutual opening of the bishop diagonals with 1. P-76 P-34.

=== Fortress development from Bishop Exchange ===
Typical Bishop Exchange
☖ pieces in hand: –

9	8	7	6	5	4	3	2	1
香	桂	銀	金	王		銀	桂	香	1
	飛					金	角		2
歩		歩	歩	歩	歩		歩	歩	3
						歩			4
	歩								5
		歩					歩		6
歩	歩	角	歩	歩	歩	歩		歩	7
	銀	金					飛		8
香	桂			玉	金	銀	桂	香	9

☗ pieces in hand: –
Rejected bishop trade
☖ pieces in hand: –

9	8	7	6	5	4	3	2	1
香	桂	銀	金	王		銀	桂	香	1
	飛					金	角		2
歩		歩	歩	歩			歩	歩	3
					歩	歩			4
	歩								5
		歩					歩		6
歩	歩	角	歩	歩	歩	歩		歩	7
	銀	金					飛		8
香	桂			玉	金	銀	桂	香	9

☗ pieces in hand: –

A Fortress position may also be developed from a rejected Bishop Exchange opening. For example, after a Bishop Exchange setup, instead of White trading the bishops off the board, White may choose to reject the bishop trade by closing their bishop diagonal. At this point, both players may convert their left side configurations into Fortress castles by pulling their bishops back and moving their silvers to the 77 and 33 squares. Thus, Black may move their bishop to 68 (or to 59 if their king moves to 69 first) allowing their left silver to move to 77. Likewise, White may move their bishop to 33 (usually triggered by Black pushing their rook pawn to 25), move their left silver to 22, move their bishop to 42 allowing their left silver to move 33.

Although possible, this Fortress development is not very common among professional players. When White rejects the bishop trade in this way, it is more common for White to play a Snowroof position while Black switches to a Fortress position instead of a Double Fortress game.

==== Game example ====
Ueno vs Nishikawa 2008
up to move 20
☖ pieces in hand: –

9	8	7	6	5	4	3	2	1
香	桂	銀		王			桂	香	1
	飛					金	銀		2
歩		歩	歩		金	角	歩	歩	3
				歩	歩	歩			4
	歩						歩		5
		歩			歩				6
歩	歩	角	歩	歩		歩		歩	7
	銀	金		金	銀		飛		8
香	桂		玉				桂	香	9

☗ pieces in hand: –
Ueno vs Nishikawa 2008
up to move 24
☖ pieces in hand: –

9	8	7	6	5	4	3	2	1
香	桂	銀		王			桂	香	1
	飛				角	金			2
歩		歩	歩		金	銀	歩	歩	3
				歩	歩	歩			4
	歩						歩		5
		歩			歩				6
歩	歩	銀	歩	歩		歩		歩	7
		金		金	銀		飛		8
香	桂		玉	角			桂	香	9

☗ pieces in hand: –

Hirokazu Ueno vs Keiji Nishikawa 2008.

== See also ==
- Fortress opening
- Fortress castle
- Static Rook
- Shogi opening

== Bibliography ==
- Aono, Teruichi (2009) [1983]. Better moves for better shogi. Translated by Fairbairn, John (2nd ed.). Ishi Press. ISBN 978-4-87187-999-6.
- Aono, Teruichi (1983). Guide to shogi openings: Unlock the secrets of joseki 将棋定跡のカギ: 和英 定跡問題集. Translated by Fairbairn, John. 山海堂. ISBN 4-381-00598-8.
- Fairbairn, John (1981). "How to play the fortress opening part 1". Shogi (29): 4–6.
- Fairbairn, John (1981). "How to play the fortress opening part 2". Shogi (30): 14–15.
- Fairbairn, John (1984). Shogi for Beginners. Ishi Press. ISBN 978-4-8718-720-10.
- Hosking, Tony (1996). The art of shogi. The Shogi Foundation. ISBN 978-0-95310-890-9.
- Kitao, Madoka (2011). Joseki at a glance. Translated by Kawasaki, Tomohide. Nekomado. ISBN 978-4-9052-2501-0.
- Kitao, Madoka (2013). Sabaki at a glance. Translated by Kawasaki, Tomohide. Nekomado. ISBN 978-4-9052-2510-2.
- "kieta senpō no nazo" 消えた戦法の謎 [Quest of the lost systems]. Shogi.Net. Mainichi Communications Co. 1995. · Partial translation of 消えた戦法の謎 kieta senpō no nazo by Kiyokazu Katsumata.
- Yebisu, Miles (2016). Comprehensive shogi guide in English: How to play Japanese chess. Laboratory Publishing.
- "ザ・雁木: ▲８八銀 ５六歩型の駒組み". 増田康宏の将棋講座. Episode 2. 2017. 銀河将棋チャンネル – via Niconico. (in Japanese)
