= Fortress opening =

Shogi opening

Double Fortress variation
after 32 moves
☖ pieces in hand: –

9	8	7	6	5	4	3	2	1
香	桂						桂	香	1
	飛		銀			金	王		2
歩			歩		金	銀	歩	歩	3
	歩	歩	角	歩	歩	歩			4
									5
		歩	歩	歩		歩			6
歩	歩	銀	金		歩	銀	歩	歩	7
	玉	金	角				飛		8
香	桂						桂	香	9

☗ pieces in hand: –
A common variation. Both players' kings are fully inside Fortress castles. Black has advanced their right offensive silver to 37 while White's bishop is positioned on 64.

Fortress (矢倉 or 櫓 yagura) is both a Static Rook opening (矢倉戦法 yagura senpō) and a castle in shogi.

It is usually played in a Double Static Rook opening, which is often a Double Fortress opening. However, it may also occur in different Double Static Rook openings such as Fortress vs Right Fourth File Rook.

The Fortress castle (矢倉囲い yagura gakoi), which is the defining characteristic of Fortress games, was considered by many to be one of the strongest defensive positions in Double Static Rook games in the 1980s.

The term yagura is the Japanese word for a tower-like structure in traditional Japanese castles.

== Double Fortress ==
Double Fortress
☖ pieces in hand: –

9	8	7	6	5	4	3	2	1
香	桂				王		桂	香	1
	飛		銀	金		金			2
歩			歩			銀	歩	歩	3
	歩	歩	角	歩	歩	歩			4
									5
		歩	歩	歩		歩			6
歩	歩	銀	金		歩	銀	歩	歩	7
		金	角				飛		8
香	桂		玉				桂	香	9

☗ pieces in hand: –

The most commonly encountered Fortress strategies occur in Double Fortress games where both players use a Fortress formation.

== Historical Fortress ==
Earlier josekis for Fortress in the Edo period (usually spelled 櫓 at that time) were very different from the current josekis.

For instance, in one variation, it is White who delays pushing their rook pawn (whereas Black delays the rook pawn push in the modern era) and an early bishop trade occurs before both players' kings are moved into their castles.

== vs Right Fourth File Rook ==
Fortress vs Right Fourth Rook
☖ pieces in hand: –

9	8	7	6	5	4	3	2	1
香	桂		金	王	金	銀	桂	香	1
			飛				角		2
歩		歩		歩	歩		歩	歩	3
	歩			銀		歩			4
			歩						5
		歩	歩	歩			歩		6
歩	歩			銀	歩	歩		歩	7
	角	金	銀				飛		8
香	桂			玉			桂	香	9

☗ pieces in hand: –

== vs Snowroof ==
Fortress vs Traditional Snowroof
☖ pieces in hand: –

9	8	7	6	5	4	3	2	1
香	桂			角	王		桂	香	1
	飛			金		金			2
歩				銀	銀		歩	歩	3
		歩	歩	歩	歩	歩			4
	歩						歩		5
		歩	歩	歩					6
歩	歩	銀	金	銀	歩	歩		歩	7
		金	角				飛		8
香	桂	玉					桂	香	9

☗ pieces in hand: –
Position after move 32 in an Ōza match between Habu (Black) and Nakamura (White) on September 18, 2013.

The Snowroof strategy can be played against a Fortress opponent.

Modern Snowroof vs Fortress
☖ pieces in hand: –

9	8	7	6	5	4	3	2	1
香	桂				王	角	桂	香	1
	飛		銀			金			2
歩			歩		金	銀	歩	歩	3
		歩		歩	歩	歩			4
	歩						歩		5
		歩	歩		歩	歩			6
歩	歩	角	銀	歩	銀	桂		歩	7
		金		金					8
香	桂			玉			飛	香	9

☗ pieces in hand: –
Position after move 29 of Momoko Katou (Black) vs Daisuke Nakagawa (White) August 25, 2017.

=== Rapid Attack Fortress ===
Rapid Attack Fortress strategies are characterized by the fact that White will start the fight following Black's blocking of the bishop's diagonal. These are active plans where White wants to avoid a development in which Black takes hold of the initiative. The side playing Fortress aims at building up a position wary of the rival's rapid attack. There are a number of variations:

- Sitting King Bogin (or "Super Rapid Attack Bogin")
- Right Fourth File Rook
- Central Rook Fortress
- Masuda Rapid Attack Fortress
- Yonenaga Rapid Attack Fortress
- Akutsu Rapid Attack Fortress (also known as Nakahara, Goda or Watanabe Rapid Attack)
- Crab Silvers

The rapid attack strategy will vary depending on whether in the fifth move Sente plays P-66 or S-77. For example, both Sitting King Bogin and Right Fourth File Rook are played following P-66, while Central Rook Fortress and Akutsu Rapid Attack Fortress are played following S-77. Yonenaga Rapid Attack Fortress can be played against either.

== vs White's Left Mino ==
Fortress vs Left Mino
☖ pieces in hand: –

9	8	7	6	5	4	3	2	1
香	桂			王	金	角	桂	香	1
	飛		銀			銀			2
歩		歩	歩		金		歩	歩	3
	歩			歩	歩	歩			4
									5
		歩	歩	歩		歩			6
歩	歩	銀	金		歩		歩	歩	7
					銀		飛		8
香	桂	角	金	玉			桂	香	9

☗ pieces in hand: –
after 19 moves
Fortress vs Left Mino
☖ pieces in hand: –

9	8	7	6	5	4	3	2	1
香	桂				金		桂	香	1
	飛		銀			銀	王		2
歩			歩		金		歩	歩	3
		歩	角	歩	歩	歩			4
	歩								5
		歩	歩	歩		歩	歩		6
歩	歩	銀	金		歩	銀		歩	7
	玉	金					飛		8
香	桂	角					桂	香	9

☗ pieces in hand: –
after 31 moves

1. P-76 P-84

2. S-68 P-34

3. P-66 S-62

4. P-56 P-54

5. S-48 G61-52

6. G49-58 S-32

7. G-67 P-44

8. S-77 G-43

9. B-79 B-31

10. P-36

== See also ==
- Fortress castle
- Fortress vs Right Fourth File Rook
- Static Rook
- Shogi opening

== Bibliography ==
- Aono, Teruichi (2009) [1983]. Better moves for better shogi. Translated by Fairbairn, John (2nd ed.). Ishi Press. ISBN 978-4-87187-999-6.
- Fairbairn, John (1981). "How to play the fortress opening part 1". Shogi (29): 4–6.
- Fairbairn, John (1981). "How to play the fortress opening part 2". Shogi (30): 14–15.
- Fairbairn, John (1984). Shogi for Beginners. Ishi Press. ISBN 978-4-8718-720-10.
- Hosking, Tony (1996). The art of shogi. The Shogi Foundation. ISBN 978-0-95310-890-9.
- Kitao, Madoka (2011). Joseki at a glance. Translated by Kawasaki, Tomohide. Nekomado. ISBN 978-4-9052-2501-0.
- Kitao, Madoka (2013). Sabaki at a glance. Translated by Kawasaki, Tomohide. Nekomado. ISBN 978-4-9052-2510-2.
