= Right Fourth File Rook =

Shogi opening

Right Fourth File Rook formation
☖ pieces in hand: –

9	8	7	6	5	4	3	2	1
									1
									2
									3
									4
									5
				銀	歩	歩	歩	歩	6
			歩	歩		桂			7
					飛				8
								香	9

☗ pieces in hand: –

In shogi, Right Fourth File Rook (右四間飛車 migi shikenbisha) is a Static Rook opening in which the rook is positioned on the fourth file if played by Black or the sixth file if played by White.

Typically, Right Fourth File Rook develops the right silver into a Reclining Silver attacking structure.

== Right Fourth File Rook vs Fourth File Rook ==
Static Rook vs Fourth File Rook
☖ pieces in hand: –

9	8	7	6	5	4	3	2	1
香	桂	銀	金	王	金	銀	桂	香	1
					飛		角		2
歩	歩	歩	歩	歩			歩	歩	3
					歩	歩			4
									5
		歩					歩		6
歩	歩		歩	歩	歩	歩		歩	7
	角				銀		飛		8
香	桂	銀	金	玉	金		桂	香	9

☗ pieces in hand: –
first six moves

A Right Fourth File Rook strategy may be played against a Ranging Rook position such as Fourth File Rook. In a Right Fourth File Rook vs Fourth File Rook game, each player's rook will be directly opposing each other on the fourth file supported by attacking silvers. Below shows an example of Black's Right Fourth File Rook against White's Fourth File Rook.

1. P-76 P-34, 2. P-26 P-44, 3. S-48 R-42. The first six moves are standard Static Rook vs Fourth File Rook piece development. (See: Left Silver-57 Rapid Attack vs Fourth File Rook for explication.)

vs Fourth File Rook
☖ pieces in hand: –

9	8	7	6	5	4	3	2	1
香	桂	銀	金	王	金	銀	桂	香	1
					飛		角		2
歩	歩	歩	歩	歩			歩	歩	3
					歩	歩			4
									5
		歩			歩		歩		6
歩	歩		歩	歩		歩		歩	7
	角				銀		飛		8
香	桂	銀	金	玉	金		桂	香	9

☗ pieces in hand: –
vs Fourth File Rook
☖ pieces in hand: –

9	8	7	6	5	4	3	2	1
香	桂	銀	金	王	金		桂	香	1
					飛	銀	角		2
歩	歩	歩	歩	歩			歩	歩	3
					歩	歩			4
									5
		歩			歩		歩		6
歩	歩		歩	歩	銀	歩		歩	7
	角						飛		8
香	桂	銀	金	玉	金		桂	香	9

☗ pieces in hand: –

4. P-46. The Right Fourth File Rook opening starts by advancing Black's fourth file pawn. (Note: For comparison, in typical [non-Right Fourth File Rook] Static Rook position, Black advances their central file pawn [that is, P-56] instead of the fourth file pawn.) This allows an opening for the left silver to pass through the front line of pawns.

vs Fourth File Rook
☖ pieces in hand: –

9	8	7	6	5	4	3	2	1
香	桂	銀	金	王	金		桂	香	1
					飛		角		2
歩	歩	歩	歩	歩	銀		歩	歩	3
					歩	歩			4
									5
		歩		銀	歩		歩		6
歩	歩		歩	歩		歩		歩	7
	角						飛		8
香	桂	銀	金	玉	金	銀	桂	香	9

☗ pieces in hand: –
vs Fourth File Rook
☖ pieces in hand: –

9	8	7	6	5	4	3	2	1
香	桂	銀	金		金		桂	香	1
			王		飛		角		2
歩	歩	歩	歩	歩	銀		歩	歩	3
					歩	歩			4
									5
		歩		銀	歩		歩		6
歩	歩		歩	歩		歩		歩	7
	角						飛		8
香	桂	銀	金	玉	金		桂	香	9

☗ pieces in hand: –

vs Fourth File Rook
☖ pieces in hand: –

9	8	7	6	5	4	3	2	1
香	桂	銀	金		金		桂	香	1
			王		飛		角		2
歩	歩	歩	歩	歩	銀		歩	歩	3
					歩	歩			4
									5
		歩		銀	歩		歩		6
歩	歩		歩	歩		歩		歩	7
	角				飛				8
香	桂	銀	金	玉	金		桂	香	9

☗ pieces in hand: –
vs Fourth File Rook
☖ pieces in hand: –

9	8	7	6	5	4	3	2	1
香	桂	銀	金		金		桂	香	1
	王				飛		角		2
歩	歩	歩	歩	歩	銀		歩	歩	3
					歩	歩			4
									5
		歩		銀	歩		歩		6
歩	歩		歩	歩		歩		歩	7
	角	玉			飛				8
香	桂	銀	金		金		桂	香	9

☗ pieces in hand: –

vs Fourth File Rook
☖ pieces in hand: –

9	8	7	6	5	4	3	2	1
香	桂	銀	金		金		桂	香	1
	王				飛		角		2
	歩	歩	歩	歩	銀		歩	歩	3
歩					歩	歩			4
									5
歩		歩		銀	歩		歩		6
	歩		歩	歩		歩		歩	7
	角	玉			飛				8
香	桂	銀	金		金		桂	香	9

☗ pieces in hand: –
vs Fourth File Rook
☖ pieces in hand: –

9	8	7	6	5	4	3	2	1
香	桂		金				桂	香	1
	王	銀		金	飛				2
	歩	歩	歩		銀	角	歩	歩	3
歩				歩	歩	歩			4
									5
歩		歩		銀	歩	歩	歩		6
	歩		歩	歩		桂		歩	7
	角	玉		金	飛				8
香	桂	銀	金					香	9

☗ pieces in hand: –

vs Fourth File Rook
☖ pieces in hand: –

9	8	7	6	5	4	3	2	1
香	桂		金				桂	香	1
	王	銀		金	飛				2
	歩	歩			銀	角	歩	歩	3
歩			歩	歩	歩	歩			4
							桂		5
歩		歩		銀	歩	歩	歩	歩	6
	歩		歩	歩					7
	角	玉		金	飛				8
香	桂	銀	金					香	9

☗ pieces in hand: –
vs Fourth File Rook
☖ pieces in hand: 銀 歩

9	8	7	6	5	4	3	2	1
香	桂		金				桂	香	1
	王	銀		金	飛				2
	歩	歩					歩	歩	3
歩			歩		歩	歩			4
			角	歩			歩		5
歩		歩			飛	歩	歩	歩	6
	歩		歩	歩				歩	7
	角	玉		金					8
香	桂	銀	金					香	9

☗ pieces in hand: 角 銀 歩

== See also ==
- Fortress opening
- Fourth File Rook
- Static Rook

== Bibliography ==
- 杉本, 昌隆 (2003). 杉本流四間飛車の定跡. 創元社. ISBN 4422750895.
- Kitao, Madoka (2011). Joseki at a glance. Translated by Kawasaki, Tomohide. Nekomado. ISBN 978-4-9052-2501-0.
