= Kōichi =

- Pronunciation: [koː.itɕi]

Origin
- Origin: Japanese

Other names
- Alternative spelling: Kōichi; Kouichi; Kohichi
- Related names: Hiroshi; Koji

Kōichi, Koichi, Kouichi or Kohichi is a masculine Japanese given name.

== Written forms ==
Kōichi can be written using different kanji characters and can mean:

- 晃一, "clear, one"
- 幸一, "happiness, one"
- 光一, "light, one"
- 孝一, "filial piety, one"
- 弘一, "vast, one"
- 浩一, "abundance, one"
- 宏一, "wide, one"
- 恒一, "constancy, one"
- 耕一, "cultivate, one"
- 孝市, "filial piety, market"

The name can also be written in hiragana (こういち) or katakana (コウイチ).

== People with the name ==
- Kohichi Amano (天野 浩一; born 1979), Japanese baseball player
- Koichi Chigira (孝一, born 1959), Japanese anime director
- Koichi Domoto (born 1979), Japanese performing artist
- Kōichi Fukaura, Japanese shogi player
- Koichi Fukuda (born 1975), Japanese musician
- Koichi Hamada (economist) (浜田 宏一; born 1936), Japanese economist
- Kōichi Hamada (浜田 幸一; 1928–2012), Japanese politician
- Koichi Iida ((飯田 鴻一, 1888–1973), Japanese businessman
- Kouichi Inoue (井上 幸一; born 1946), Japanese golfer
- Koichi Ishii (浩一, born 1964), Japanese game designer
- Koichi Kato (LDP) (1939–2016), Japanese politician
- Koichi Kato (DPJ) (born 1964), Japanese politician
- Koichi Kawakita (1942–2014), Japanese special effects artist
- Kōichi Kido (1889–1977), Lord Keeper of the Privy Seal of Japan during World War II
- Kōichi Kinoshita (木下 浩一; born 1967), Japanese shogi player
- Kōichi Kitamura (1931–2007), Japanese voice actor
- Kōichi Mashimo (born 1952), Japanese anime director
- Koichi Miyano (宮野 洪一; born 1942), Japanese rower
- Koichi Mizushima (born 1965), Japanese gymnast
- Kōichi Morishita (森下 広一; born 1967), Japanese long-distance runner
- Koichi Morita (songwriter)
- Koichi Murata (村田 航一; born 1996), Japanese footballer
- Koichi Nakamura (中村 光一; born 1964), Japanese video game designer
- Koichi Nakano (中野 浩一; born 1955), former professional racing cyclist and ten-consecutive-time world champion in track cycling sprint
- Koichi Nishimura (born 1973), Japanese volleyball player
- Koichi Ono (小野 光一; 1919–2000), Japanese golfer
- Kōichi Sakaguchi (坂口 候一, born 1968), Japanese voice actor
- Kōichi Satō (actor) (佐藤 浩市; born 1960), Japanese actor
- Koichi Sato (biathlete) (佐藤 幸一; born 1956), Japanese biathlete
- Koichi Sato (footballer) (佐藤 洸一; born 1986), Japanese footballer
- Koichi Sato (philatelist) (佐藤 浩一), Japanese philatelist
- Koichi Sato (ski jumper) (佐藤 耕一; born 1931), Japanese ski jumper
- Koichi Shoji (庄司浩一; 1955–2019), Japanese murderer
- Kōichi Sueyoshi (末吉興一; 1934–2025), Japanese politician
- Koichi Sugawara (菅原 貢一; born 1950), Japanese bobsledder
- Koichi Sugiyama (こういち; birth name 浩一, 1931–2021), Japanese video game composer
- Kōichi Tabuchi (田淵 幸一; born 1946), Japanese baseball player and manager
- Koichi Tanaka (born 1959), Japanese Nobel Prize winner in chemistry
- Koichi Togashi (冨樫 剛一; born 1971), Japanese footballer and manager
- Koichi Tohei (1920–2011), Japanese aikido practitioner
- Kōichi Tokita (born 1961), Japanese manga artist
- Kōichi Tōchika (born 1971), Japanese voice actor
- Koichi Wakata (born 1963), Japanese astronaut
- Kōichi Yamadera (born 1961), Japanese voice actor
- Koichi Kobayashi (born 1952), Japanese Go player
- Koichi Morishita (born 1967), Japanese long-distance runner
- KouichiTV (コウイチTV) (born 1996), Japanese YouTuber and filmmaker

== Fictional characters ==
- Kouichi Kimura, from the TV series Digimon Frontier
- Koichi Shido, from manga/anime Highschool of the Dead
- Kouichi Hayase, from manga/anime Linebarrels of Iron
- Koichi Hirose (広瀬康一), a character from the manga and anime series JoJo's Bizarre Adventure
- Koichi Zenigata, from Lupin III
- Koichi Hayama, from adult anime/game Moonlight Lady
- Koichi Hiramoto, from Wangan Midnight
- Koichi Kijima, from Wangan Midnight
- Kōichi Tanemura, a character from the anime/manga Hanasaku Iroha
- Kōichi Sakakibara, the main protagonist of the series Another
- Kōichi Sakakibara, a character from the tokusatsu Kamen Rider Ryuki Special: 13 Riders
- Koichi Kizakura, a character from the anime Danganronpa 3: The End of Hope's Peak High School
- Koichi Haimawari, a character from the manga Boku no Hero Academia
- Koichi Adachi, a character and main party member from the videogame Yakuza: Like a Dragon
- Koichi Nanase, a character from the anime Gundam Build Divers
- Kōichi Shikishima (敷島 浩一), the main protagonist of the 2023 Japanese epic kaiju film Godzilla Minus One
