= Cozy castle =

Type of shogi castle

Black is playing a simple Cozy castle while White is playing High Cozy castle
☖ pieces in hand: –

9	8	7	6	5	4	3	2	1
香		銀				銀	桂	香	1
					金	王			2
		桂			金	角			3
	歩	歩	歩		歩	歩	歩		4
歩									5
								歩	6
					歩	歩	歩		7
					金	玉			8
						銀	桂	香	9

☗ pieces in hand: –
Simple Cozy castle (Black) vs High Cozy castle (White)
☖ pieces in hand: –

9	8	7	6	5	4	3	2	1
香		銀				銀	桂	香	1
					金	王			2
		桂			金	角			3
	歩	歩	歩		歩	歩	歩		4
歩									5
								歩	6
					歩	歩	歩		7
					金	玉			8
						銀	桂	香	9

☗ pieces in hand: –

The Cozy castle or Ōsumi castle (Japanese: 大住囲い or 大隅囲い, romanized: Ōsumi gakoi) is a type of shogi castle.

It is one of the fastest castles to form; it can be completed in just three moves (e.g., in the case of Black (sente) castling to the right, K-48, K-38, G-48). It is mainly used in ranging rook openings, but it can be used in static rook openings as well.

== Overview ==
"Ōsumi" is an abbreviation for "大いに住みやすい" (ōi ni sumiyasui), which means "very comfortable" or "very livable", reflecting the castle's ability to quickly enclose the king and to flexibly rearrange as the game develops. The name can also be derived from 大きな隅 (ōki na sumi, "big corner"); the king is castled in a "large corner" due to the configuration of the pieces. In Japanese, the name of the castle is also written as 大隅.

The Ōsumi castle is strong against attacks from the center, avoids the opponent's bishop's diagonal, is difficult to counter when attacking along the edges, and makes it easy to aim for a Subway Rook. It can be attacked while developing the castle, but can easily develop into a well-balanced castle that is strong against bishop exchange and in the battle for the king's head. It has a very high degree of extensibility, and it is possible to flexibly develop various strategies.

The Ōsumi castle avoids one of the weaknesses of the Mino castle and some other ranging rook castles: Black cannot defend the point at 28. The Ōsumi castle is also more resistant to wild, rough games than the Wall castle (S-68 silver, G-69 for Black), which was common for traditional static rook quick attack strategies, and the Elmo castle, which became popular around 2018. Both of the latter are disrupted when White exchanges bishops with Bx88+, while the Ōsumi castle allows Black to play Sx88.

On September 18, 2021, in the second match for the first Hulic Haikurei Cup title between Mana Watanabe (women's 3-dan) and Tomoka Nishiyama (women's 3-crown), Nishiyama (playing White) attacked from the 5th file from a Central Rook Cozy castle, and won a fierce battle for the king's head by exploiting the advantages of the castle.

On October 24, 2021, Sakiko Odaka (White) won a match with halfway Cozy castle for the final of the Shirataki Ayumi Cup.

In 2020, Sōta Fujii used match records using the Cozy castle to illustrate his argument that contemporary Shogi is distinguished, in part, by castles changing as the game develops and by the integration of the castling and the offense.

== Use ==
=== Classical Shogi era ===
01/18/1608: Sokei Ōhashi (Black) vs Hon'inbō Sansa (White)
☖ pieces in hand: –

9	8	7	6	5	4	3	2	1
香	桂	銀			金		桂	香	1
		王	金		飛				2
歩	歩	歩	歩		銀	角	歩	歩	3
				歩	歩	歩			4
									5
		歩		歩	歩	歩	歩		6
歩	歩	角	歩	銀	銀			歩	7
							飛		8
香	桂		金	玉	金		桂	香	9

☗ pieces in hand: –

The Cozy castle has existed since the beginning of classical shogi. In the game between Sokei Ōhashi and Hon'inbō Sansa on January 18, 1608, considered the second-oldest game record in existence, White played G-62 on the 20th move to castle the king in Cozy castle (see Figure).

The Cozy castle has since appeared frequently in game records of classical shogi. The attached Figure shows a match by Sōho Amano where he castles the king in a Cozy castle.

06/01/1844: Namie Wada (Black) vs Sōho Amano (White)
☖ pieces in hand: –

9	8	7	6	5	4	3	2	1
香	桂					銀	桂	香	1
	飛				金	王			2
歩		歩	金	銀	歩	歩	歩	歩	3
	歩		歩	歩					4
									5
		歩	歩	歩		歩	歩		6
歩	歩		金		歩			歩	7
	角	銀				銀	飛		8
香	桂		金	玉			桂	香	9

☗ pieces in hand: –

=== Modern Shogi before computers ===
Masakazu Kondō (Black) vs Kazushiza Horiguchi (White) (02/09/2000)
☖ pieces in hand: –

9	8	7	6	5	4	3	2	1
香	桂	銀	金		金	銀	桂	香	1
		王		飛			角		2
歩	歩	歩	歩		歩		歩		3
				歩		歩			4
									5
		歩		歩					6
歩	歩		歩		歩	歩	歩	歩	7
	角			飛	金	玉			8
香	桂	銀	金			銀	桂	香	9

☗ pieces in hand: –

The Cozy castle was used occasionally even in modern Shogi, particularly in games of Central Rook and slow (endurance) games, because it allows for quick preparations against central or side attacks. Masakazu Kondō, who won the Masuda Award for his development of "Cheerful Central Rook," described his move of pushing the gold up the 48th square (11. G-48), hence castling his king in the Cozy castle, as "a move I am proud of" (see Figure).

2012 Women's Oza title match: Nakamura (Black) vs Miyaso (White) (05/19/2012)
☖ pieces in hand: 歩(2)

9	8	7	6	5	4	3	2	1
香	桂					金	桂	香	1
	銀	王		金					2
歩	歩	歩	歩		銀	角		歩	3
						歩			4
			桂						5
	角				飛		歩		6
歩	歩		銀	龍		歩		歩	7
					金	玉			8
香			金			銀	桂	香	9

☗ pieces in hand: 歩 (5)

Likewise, in the 2012 Women's Oza title match against Shino Miyasō, Momoko Nakamura won the match by using the Cozy castle. As can be seen in the diagram, Nakamura made use of the advantages of the Cozy castle to play +R-57. The link of gold, silver, and king combined with that of dragon, bishop, and knight is effective both in offense and defense.

=== Modern Shogi after the rise of computer Shogi ===
When computer shogi software started to win against professional players one after another, professional players began to reevaluate formations that emphasized balance. For example, Doi's Fortress, Amano's Fortress, and Snowroof formations began being adopted once again with good results, while Static Rook players started to use the Quick Attack Elmo castle against Fourth File Rook and against S-43 Third File Rook with good results. In this manner, balanced-type castles attracted renewed attention among professional players. In this context, Sōta Fujii defeated Tetsurō Itodani in 2018, and Yasumitsu Satō defeated Yoshiharu Habu in 2020, in both cases by castling in the Cozy castle. (In the Fujii vs. Itodani game, the Cozy castle was used in Static Rook, while in the Satō vs. Habu game, the Cozy castle was used in Bishop Exchange Ranging Rook.)

In a similar vein, Takahiro Ōhashi has been successful in adopting a Fourth File Rook strategy which castles the king at K-72 (K-38) and released a game book on this topic in 2020. In the book, Ōhashi introduces his Yōryū (Shining Dragon) Fourth File Rook strategy to the readers by using a basic diagram of the strategy (see Figure) with the king enclosed in the Cozy castle.

Cozy castle in normal Fourth File Rook
☖ pieces in hand:

9	8	7	6	5	4	3	2	1
香	桂				金	銀	桂	香	1
	飛		銀	金		王	角		2
歩		歩	歩		歩		歩		3
				歩		歩			4
	歩								5
		歩	歩					歩	6
歩	歩	角		歩	歩	歩	歩		7
		銀	飛		金	玉			8
香	桂		金			銀	桂	香	9

☗ pieces in hand:

In a game in August 2020, Shōgo Orita performed his "Orita's New Move" for Yōryū Fourth File Rook to win his first professional game. In 2020, the Yōryū Fourth File Rook and other K-72 Fourth File Rook positions became popular. In April 2021, Takahiro Ōhashi was awarded the Masuda Award for his development of Yōryū Fourth File Rook.

Ryūō Tournament - 3rd Round final: Fujii (Black) vs. Sugimoto (White), 20/06/2020
☖ pieces in hand: -

9	8	7	6	5	4	3	2	1
香	桂	銀		飛				香	1
	角	王	金			金			2
	歩		歩		銀	桂	歩	歩	3
歩		歩				歩			4
			歩	歩	歩				5
歩		歩				歩		歩	6
	歩			銀	歩	桂			7
	角	玉	金		金				8
香	桂	銀					飛	香	9

☗ pieces in hand: 歩 (2)

==== Double Cozy castle ====
A Double Cozy castle has been used in the past in Double Central Rook strategies. Such a position occurred, for instance, on June 20, 2020, in the final of the 3rd Round of the Ryūō Tournament (Sōta Fujii vs Masataka Sugimoto), with both sides using the castle. This has sparked some interest in Double Cozy castle strategies.

In December 2020, Sōta Fujii discussed this Double Cozy castle game as well as games he played with Cozy castle against Sakata Opposing Rook, describing it as a game that, along with games using Doi's Fortress and Central House, "illustrated the characteristics of the (latest) modern Shogi castling" (Shogi Sekai Special: Sota Fujii's Theory of Castling). In the article, Fujii cited the Double Cozy castle game as a concrete example of a "changeable castle", and after explaining the aims of Black and White's moves and their subsequent developments, he stated, "As you can see, in modern shogi, a battle rarely ends with a fixed, set castle. The castling changes as you wage battle." He also cited his game of Cozy castle against Sakata Opposing Rock as a concrete example of "castling in anticipation of the attack", and after explaining the features of the Cozy castle and its subsequent developments, said: "This is an example of castling leading to the attack."

In 2020, the number of professional games where the Cozy castle is used increased significantly. It became one of the predominant castles in Bishop-Exchange Ranging Rook and Normal Ranging Rook.

Even in Static Rook, in Ponanza style vs. Fourth File Rook, the two-gold type quick attack Static Rook, which takes the Cozy castle as a reference, has become popular. The strategy of switching from the two-gold type to the G-67 gold (G-43) type of High Cozy castle, and developing it into Matsuo Bear-in-the-hole, or others, while preventing the attacks from the Fourth File rook opponent. Throughout 2021 the castle has continued to appear in professional shogi tournaments.

==== Popularity ====
The position in which another gold is placed on top of the gold in the Cozy castle to extend it vertically is called High Cozy castle (in Japanese, 高大住, taka ōsumi) or Long Cozy castle (in Japanese, 長大住, naga ōsumi).

A High Cozy castle is denser at the top and in the center, making it more balanced and making it easier to use the knight. In addition, as will be explained later, a High Cozy castle can be converted into a Matsuo Anaguma or an Amano Yagura castle and has high extensibility.

By pushing the pawns in the vicinity of the king, the castle becomes wider at the top, which increases the safety of the king against side attacks.

== Development ==
There are two methods of castling: moving the king first (K-48, K-38, G-48), or moving up the gold first (G-48, K-49, K-38). The first one is the natural sequence, and it promptly eliminates the sitting king situation, while allowing for the possibility of building a Mino castle by going with K-28 instead of moving up the gold with G-48. In the second case, the player can dare to stand by with the king at K-59 or K-49. It is also possible to go for a Central House castle.

=== High Cozy castle (Long Cozy castle) ===
High Cozy castle (Long Cozy castle）
☖ pieces in hand:

9	8	7	6	5	4	3	2	1
香									1
	銀	王	金						2
		桂	金						3
歩	歩	歩	歩						4
									5
歩		歩	歩						6
	歩		金						7
	角	玉	金						8
香	桂	銀							9

☗ pieces in hand:

The position in which another gold is placed on top of the gold in the Cozy castle to extend it vertically is called High Cozy castle (in Japanese, 高大住, taka ōsumi) or Long Cozy castle (in Japanese, 長大住, naga ōsumi).

A High Cozy castle is denser at the top and in the center, making it more balanced and making it easier to use the knight. In addition, as will be explained later, a High Cozy castle can be converted into a Matsuo Bear-in-the-Hole castle or an Amano Fortress castle and has high extensibility.

By pushing the pawns in the vicinity of the king, the castle becomes wider at the top, which increases the safety of the king against side attacks.

=== Objectives of the moves ===
==== Wild (rough) games ====
2012 Women's Oza title match: Nakamura (Black) vs Kumakura (White) (05/19/2012)
☖ pieces in hand: 歩(2)

9	8	7	6	5	4	3	2	1
香	桂					金	桂	香	1
	銀	王		金					2
歩	歩	歩	歩		銀	角		歩	3
						歩			4
			桂						5
	角				飛		歩		6
歩	歩		銀	龍		歩		歩	7
					金	玉			8
香			金			銀	桂	香	9

☗ pieces in hand: 歩 (5)

As can be seen in the diagram, Nakamura made use of the advantages of the Cozy castle to play +R-57. The link of gold, silver, and king combined with that of dragon, bishop, and knight is effective both in offense and defense.

In cases where an opponent goes for a sitting king without building a castle and starts a wild game (i.e., situations in which pieces collide with each other at multiple points on the board, or in which many pieces are exchanged), the player will likely take advantage of the fact that the Cozy castle is more solid and aim for one of the many advantageous developments possible.

In the above diagram for the Ryūō between Fujii and Sugimoto, Black's position is more solid than White's, so Black can engage the opponent with superiority thanks to those advantageous developments. After the position in the diagram, Fujii, playing Black, moved the knight to N-73, a move with which he eliminated in advance the risk along the bishop diagonal, and, simultaneously, prepared moves to further advance the knight to either N-65 or N-85, hence integrating the offense and the castling. In the actual game, the Cozy castle allowed Fujii to defend against the opponent's quick attack, and the knight advanced at N-85 helping him checkmating the opponent's king.

==== Static Rook (vs Normal Fourth File Rook) ====
Ponanza vs NineDayFever, 27th World Computer Shogi Championship
☖ pieces in hand: –

9	8	7	6	5	4	3	2	1
香	桂	王	金				桂	香	1
		銀		金	飛				2
歩	歩	歩	歩	歩	銀	角	歩	歩	3
					歩	歩			4
歩									5
		歩		歩		歩			6
	歩		歩	銀	歩		歩	歩	7
	角	玉	金				飛		8
香	桂	銀			金		桂	香	9

☗ pieces in hand: –

Ponanza, a computer Shogi software, displayed a strategy of castling the king in the Cozy castle early in the game against a normal Fourth File Rook strategy and then changing to various positions from there.

The attached diagram shows the point at which Ponanza (Black) adopted a Quick-Attack Feint (亜急戦, akyūsen) Cozy castle strategy against a Fourth File Rook (by software NineDayFever, playing White) in the finals of the World Computer Shogi Championship. (Quick-Attack Feint tactics involve pretending to go with a Quick Attack to push the opponent to play anti-quick attack tactics, and then switching back to a slow game).

There are many aims in the Ponanza Quick-Attack Feint Cozy castle strategy. Especially noteworthy is the following step-by-step development:

1. From the Cozy castle, advance the right gold to G-58 (G-52 for White) to show a quick attack. Compared to going with a quick attack with the S-68, G-69 position, the Cozy castle is stronger following bishop exchange as the right gold covers the point at 57 (G-57), so the castle remains strong even if the right gold is removed, and the gold and silver are relatively well connected. Hence, the Fourth File Rook side must take measures to deal with the situation.
2. If the Fourth File Rook player takes measures such as pulling the bishop or extending the castle to a High Mino castle, the player moves to the second step and pushes the right gold to G-67 (G-43 for White) to develop the castle into a High Cozy castle.
3. Once the High Cozy castle is completed, it is difficult for the Fourth File Rook side to attack the Static Rook formation, and if both Black and White choose to further solidify their castles, the game turns into a slow or endurance game. Even if the Fourth File Rook side rearranges into a Silver Crown castle, the Static Rook side can rearrange into a sturdier formation such as Matsuo Anaguma or Edge-Pawn Push Anaguma, making it difficult for the Fourth File Rook side to overcome the situation.

Since the late 2010s, based on the Ponanza Quick-Attack Feint Cozy castle strategy, the Quick-Attack Feint with two gold pieces (S-79, G-68, G-58) has become popular among professional players against Fourth File Rook, Third File Rook, and Central Rook.

However, unlike the Ponanza style, professional players often push the right gold to G-58 in the first step to make a typical Boat castle, and only then push the left gold. This makes it more similar to the traditional quick attack jōseki than to the Ponanza style. This kind of combination was a specialty of Mitsuo Kakuta (1910-1985) and was later rediscovered by Kiyokazu Katsumata.

The emphasis on the second step to rearrange the piece build-up from the two-piece type Cozy castle to a High Cozy castle, and in the third step to build up a sturdy formation such as Anaguma, are common to the Ponanza-style Quick-Attack Feint Cozy castle strategy.

Taniai vs Honda, 04/02/2020
☖ pieces in hand: – 飛 歩

9	8	7	6	5	4	3	2	1
香						銀		香	1
					金	王			2
歩		桂	歩		金	桂	歩	歩	3
		飛	銀			歩			4
					歩				5
	歩	銀		歩		歩	歩	歩	6
歩		角	金		歩		銀		7
香						金	玉		8
	桂						桂	香	9

☗ pieces in hand: – 角 歩(4)

The attached diagram, from a 2020 match between Hiroki Taniai and Kei Honda is an example of a middlegame attack race developing the second step. White's High Cozy is thick in the center and the upper part of the board. White's N-33 knight not only defends the bishop's diagonal but also enhances the connection and work of the pieces in the center and upper part of the board. White's rook and right silver also suggest various moves depending on the development.

Diagram A: Nakamura vs Watanabe
☖ pieces in hand: –

9	8	7	6	5	4	3	2	1
香						銀	桂	香	1
					金	王			2
		桂	歩		金	角	歩		3
歩	飛	歩	銀	歩	歩	歩		歩	4
									5
		歩	歩	歩	歩	歩		歩	6
歩	歩		銀		金	桂	歩		7
		飛				銀	玉		8
香	桂			角	金			香	9

☗ pieces in hand: –
Diagram B: Nakamura vs Watanabe
☖ pieces in hand: – 桂

9	8	7	6	5	4	3	2	1
香	飛						王	香	1
					銀	金	銀		2
		桂	歩			金	歩		3
歩		歩	角	歩		歩		歩	4
					歩		歩		5
	歩	歩	歩	歩		歩	銀	歩	6
歩					金	銀			7
	飛		角			銀	玉		8
香	桂							香	9

☗ pieces in hand: – 桂、歩(2)

In the third step, the game can be developed into castles other than Anaguma. The attached figures are diagrams of the second and third steps, respectively, taken from a 2020 Meijin ranking tournament match between Ryōsuke Nakamura (Black) and Kazushi Watanabe (White). White developed the Cozy castle from Diagram A to Diagram B and built a solid formation with four golds and silvers. Nakamura (Black), responded to the sennichite by playing G-47.

==== Double Central Rook ====
The Cozy castle is one of the most typical castles in Double Central Rook, insofar as they are very compatible.

==== Normal Ranging Rook (vs. Static Rook) ====
If the opponent tries to play a quick attack while castling the king, it is necessary to be aware that the king is at the nearer point for a rook side attack compared to a Mino castle. In a Mino castle, the player often takes advantage of the distance of the king to actively play the rook advantageously. In the Cozy castle, the player must carefully play around depending on the situation, for example, by firmly defending from a quick attack from the opponent, preparing a strong counter, or shifting the game to a slow (endurance) game. The player uses this high extensibility to develop the castle, exploit weak points in the opponent's position, or reinforce their position. Against slow games, the player uses this high extensibility to develop the formation flexibly.

Utilizing high extensibility to develop the enclosure, exploit the weaknesses of the opponent's team and reinforce your team.

For endurance battles, the formation will be developed flexibly by utilizing the high extensibility.

If the opponent tries to go with a quick attack while you are castling the king, it is necessary to be aware that the king is at the nearer point for a rook side attack compared to a Mino castle. In a Mino castle, the player often takes advantage of the distance of the king to actively play the rook advantageously. In the Cozy castle, the player must carefully play around depending on the situation, for example, by firmly defending from a quick attack from the opponent, preparing a strong counter, or shifting the game to a slow (endurance) game. The player uses this high extensibility to develop the castle, exploit weak points in the opponent's position, or reinforce their position. Against slow games, the player uses this high extensibility to develop the formation flexibly.

==== Double Ranging Rook ====
The Cozy castle is relatively uncommon in Opposing Rook vs. Third File Rook and other forms of Double Ranging Rook. However, it began to appear frequently in women's professional games around 2020.

==== Bishop Exchange Ranging Rook ====
The Cozy castle is also used in Bishop Exchange Ranging Rook. In the First-Move R-78 strategy, Opposing Rook, Bishop Exchange Fourth Rook File, etc., the Cozy castle and Back Rank Rook are sometimes combined to keep balance, showing Reverse Climbing Gold or playing around like a Right King. In addition, the left gold may also be used for castling, and the castle may be developed.

In Sakata Opposing Rook and Sugai G-33 Third File Rook, the advantages of the Cozy castle are that it can castle the king quickly, that it is strong against bishop drops, and that it is highly extensible. At the beginning of the game, there are not many early moves from the Static Rook side because the left silver is guarding the position at 53. After that, the Sakata Opposing Rook side may initiate a forceful battle, maintain a low formation and show a Reverse Climbing Gold or both sides may take their time in setting up their pieces.

In preparation for a B-41 from the Static Rook, the Sakata Opposing Rook player may create a Cozy castle and then set up a Central House or Sitting King. The Sakata side may move the left gold to the right side, and both sides may change the formation to Amano Yagura, Doi Yagura, and so on.
