= Koichi Sato =

Koichi Sato or Kōichi Satō may refer to:

- Kōichi Satō (actor) (佐藤 浩市, born 1960), Japanese actor
- Koichi Sato (biathlete) (佐藤 幸一, born 1956), Japanese biathlete
- Koichi Sato (footballer) (佐藤 洸一, born 1986), Japanese footballer
- Koichi Sato (philatelist) (佐藤 浩一), Japanese philatelist
- Koichi Sato (ski jumper) (佐藤 耕一, born 1931), Japanese ski jumper
