= Cozy =

Cozy or cosy may refer to:

== Arts and entertainment ==
- Cozy, a 1961 album by Steve Lawrence and Eydie Gormé
- Cozy, a 1998 album by Tatsuro Yamashita
- "Cozy", a song by the Bar-Kays on the 1976 album Too Hot to Stop
- "Cozy" (song), by Beyoncé on the 2022 album Renaissance
- Cozy Records, an American record label

=== Fiction genres ===
- Cosy catastrophe, post-apocalyptic science fiction style
- Cozy fantasy, a subgenre of fantasy fiction
- Cozy game, a genre of video games
- Cozy mystery, a subgenre of crime fiction

== People ==
- Cozy Cole (1909–1981), jazz drummer
- Cozy Dolan (1900s outfielder) (1872–1907), American baseball player
- Cozy Dolan (1910s outfielder) (1889–1958), American baseball player
- Cozy Morley (c. 1926 – 2013), American entertainer
- Cozy Powell (1947–1998), British rock drummer
- Cosy Sheridan (born 1964), American folk singer

== Other uses ==
- USS Cozy (SP-556), a U.S. Navy patrol vessel 1917–1918
- Cozy III and Cozy MK IV, homebuilt light aircraft
- Tea cosy, a cover for a teapot
- Correlation spectroscopy (COSY)
- CoSy (Conferencing System), an early computer conferencing system

== See also ==
- Koozie, a fabric or foam sleeve that is designed to thermally insulate a beverage container
- Cozy castle, a type of shogi castle
- Cozy Coupe, a toy car
