= Masaki Izumi =

Japanese shogi player

- Native name: 泉正樹
- Born: January 11, 1961 (age 65)
- Hometown: Nerima
- Nationality: Japanese

Career
- Achieved professional status: August 20, 1980 (aged 19)
- Badge Number: 144
- Rank: 8-dan
- Retired: November 4, 2025 (aged 64)
- Teacher: Shigeru Sekine (9-dan)
- Career record: 635–716 (.470)
- Meijin class: Free
- Ryūō class: 6

Websites
- JSA profile page

Masaki Izumi (泉 正樹, Izumi Masaki; January 11, 1961) is a Japanese retired professional shogi player who achieved the rank of 8-dan.

== Early life and apprenticeship ==
Izumi was born on January 11, 1961, in Nerima, Tokyo. He entered the Japan Shogi Association's apprentice school under the guidance of shogi professional Shigeru Sekine at the rank of 6-kyū in 1973. He was promoted to 1-dan in 1977 and obtained full professional status and the rank of 4-dan in August 1980.

== Shogi professional ==
Izumi is a member of the so-called Shōwa 55 group (55年組), a group of eight strong players that become professional in 1980–1981 (Year 55 of the Shōwa period) and won numerous shogi tournaments. Others in the group include Yoshikazu Minami, Osamu Nakamura, Michio Takahashi, Akira Shima, Hiroshi Kamiya, Yasuaki Tsukada, and Yūji Yoda.

Izumi became the 51st shogi professional to win 600 official games when he defeated Kōichi Kinoshita in a 59th Ōi tournament preliminary round game on October 4, 2017.

In March 2019, Izumi voluntarily declared himself as a free class player, thus leaving the Meijin tournament league.

On November 19, 2025, the JSA posted on its official website that Izumi had retired for personal reasons on November 4. 2025. He finished his career with a record of 635 wins and 716 losses for a winning percentage of 0.470.

=== Promotion history ===
Izumi's promotion history is as follows:

- 6-kyū: 1973
- 1-dan: 1977
- 4-dan: August 20, 1980
- 5-dan: April 26, 1985
- 6-dan: June 23, 1989
- 7-dan: October 9, 1997
- 8-dan: July 4, 2013

=== Awards and honors ===
Izumi received the Japan Shogi Association's "25 Years Service Award" in 2005 in recognition of being an active professional for twenty-five years, and the "Shogi Honor Award" in 2017 in recognition of winning 600 official games as a professional.
