= Reo Kurosawa =

Japanese shogi player (born 1992)

- Native name: 黒沢怜生
- Born: March 7, 1992 (age 34)
- Hometown: Kumagaya, Saitama, Japan

Career
- Achieved professional status: October 1, 2014 (aged 22)
- Badge number: 298
- Rank: 6-dan
- Teacher: Michio Takahashi (9-dan)
- Meijin class: C1
- Ryūō class: 4

Websites
- JSA profile page

Reo Kurosawa (黒沢 怜生, Kurosawa Reo; born March 7, 1992) is a Japanese professional shogi player ranked 6-dan.

== Early life, amateur shogi and apprentice professional ==
Kurosawa was born on March 7, 1992, in Kumagaya, Saitama. He learned how to play shogi at when he was elementary school first-grade student at a local children's center. In 2001, he finished runner-up in the 26th Elementary School Student Meijin Tournament as a fourth grader, and reached the semi-finals of the 27th Elementary School Student Meijin Tournament held the following year as a fifth grader. As a sixth grader in 2003, Kurosawa tied for third place at the 2nd Elementary School Student Kurashiki Ōshō Tournament, and later that same year entered the Japan Shogi Association's apprentice school at the rank of 6-kyū under the guidance of shogi professional Michio Takahashi.

Kurosawa was promoted to the rank of 3-dan in October 2010, and obtained full professional status and the rank of 4-dan in October 2014 after finishing tied for first in the 55th 3-dan League with a record of 13 wins and 5 losses.

== Shogi professional ==
=== Promotion history ===
The promotion history for Kurosawa is as follows:

- 6-kyū: September 2003
- 3-dan: October 2010
- 4-dan: October 1, 2014
- 5-dan: May 13, 2016
- 6-dan: March 18, 2021

== Personal life ==
On June 20, 2025, the JSA announced on its official website that Kurosawa and women's professional Aki Wada had gotten married.
