= Osamu Nakamura =

Japanese shogi player (born 1962)

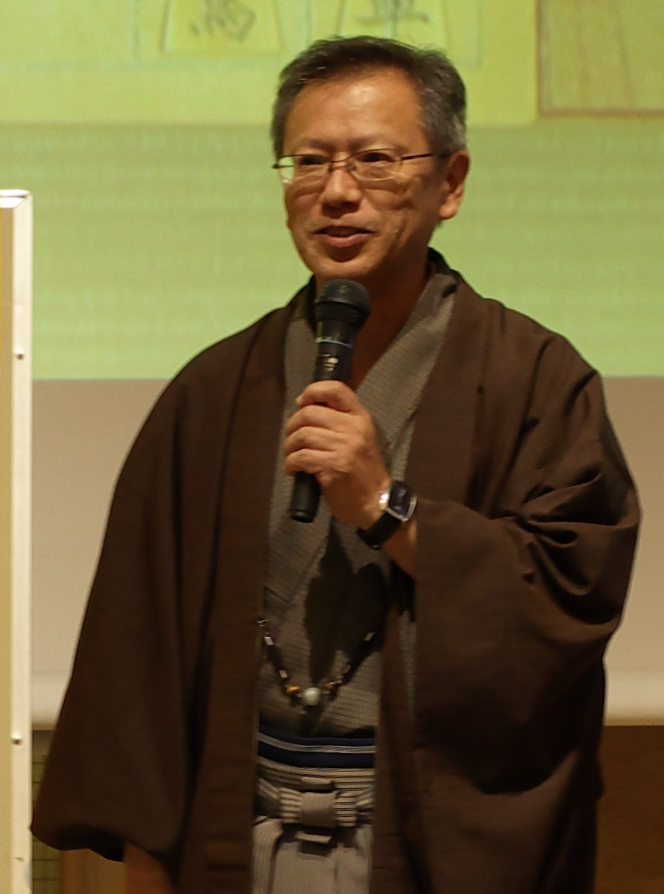
- Nakamura in October 2018.
- Native name: 中村修
- Born: November 7, 1962 (age 63)
- Hometown: Machida, Tokyo

Career
- Achieved professional status: July 2, 1980 (aged 17)
- Badge number: 143
- Rank: 9-dan
- Teacher: Yoshimasa Saeki (9-dan)
- Major titles won: 2
- Tournaments won: 11
- Meijin class: C2
- Ryūō class: 4
- Notable students: Kōru Abe; Wataru Kamimura; Ao Kokubo; Manao Kagawa

Websites
- JSA profile page

Osamu Nakamura (中村 修, Nakamura Osamu; born November 7, 1962) is a Japanese professional shogi player, ranked 9-dan. He is a two-time winner of the Ōshō title, and the current president of the Professional Shogi Players Group.

== Early life ==
Osamu Nakamura was born in Machida, Tokyo on November 7, 1962. In 1976, he won the 1st Junior High School Student Meijin Tournament, and that same year was accepted into the Japan Shogi Association's apprentice school at the rank of 6-kyū as a protegee of shogi professional Yoshimasa Saeki. He was promoted to the rank of 1-dan in 1978 and was awarded full professional status and the rank of 4-dan in July 1980.

== Shogi professional ==
Nakamura is a member of the so-called Shōwa 55 group (55年組), a group of eight strong players that become professional in 1980–1981 (Year 55 of the Shōwa period) and won numerous shogi tournaments. Others in the group include Yoshikazu Minami, Michio Takahashi, Akira Shima, Yasuaki Tsukada, Hiroshi Kamiya, Masaki Izumi, and Yūji Yoda.

On June 9, 2021, Nakamura became the 24th professional shogi player to win 800 games.

=== Promotion history ===
The promotion history for Nakamura is as follows:

- 6-kyū: 1976
- 1-dan: 1978
- 4-dan: July 2, 1980
- 5-dan: April 1, 1982
- 6-dan: April 1, 1983
- 7-dan: April 1, 1986
- 8-dan: October 15, 1993
- 9-dan: January 23, 2008

=== Titles and other championships ===
Nakamura has appeared in major title matches a total of five times and is a two-time winner of the Ōshō title. He also won the 14th Shinjin-Ō title in 1983 for his only non-major shogi championship.

=== Awards and honors ===
Nakamura has received a number of Japan Shogi Association Annual Shogi Awards throughout his career. He won the award for "Best New Player" in 1981; the "Fighting-spirit Award" in 1984 and 1986; and the "Distinguished Service Award" in 1985.

In addition, Nakamura received the "25 Years Service Award"in recognition of being an active professional for twenty-five years in 2005 as well as the "Shogi Honor Fighting-spirit Award" for winning 600 official games as a professional in 2006.

=== Professional Shogi Players Group ===
Nakamura is the current president of the Professional Shogi Players Group. He was first elected as a vice-president in April 2011, and served in that capacity until the end of February 2017 when he was selected to replace Yasumitsu Satō at a special session of the association. (Note: Satō had resigned his post at the end of January 2017 so that he could run for the JSA board of directors.) Nakamura served out the remainder of Sato's term, and was re-elected as president for a new two-year term at the end of May 2017. He was re-elected for another two-year term as president in June 2019.
