= Kōru Abe =

Japanese shogi player

- Native name: 阿部光瑠
- Born: October 25, 1994 (age 31)
- Hometown: Hirosaki

Career
- Achieved professional status: April 1, 2011 (aged 16)
- Badge Number: 283
- Rank: 7-dan
- Teacher: Osamu Nakamura (9-dan)
- Tournaments won: 1
- Meijin class: C2
- Ryūō class: 4

Websites
- JSA profile page

Kōru Abe (阿部 光瑠, Abe Kōru; born October 25, 1994) is a Japanese professional shogi player ranked 7-dan.

== Early life, amateur shogi and apprentice professional ==
Abe was born in Hirosaki, Aomori Prefecture on October 25, 1994. He learned how to play shogi from his father when he was five years old. As an elementary school student, Abe was interested in both Go and shogi. He was a big fan of the manga series Hikaru no Go and actually wanted to become a Go professional, but switched his focus to shogi after finding Go too difficult to learn. He started attending a formal shogi class at local department store when he was a fourth grade elementary school student, and won the 5th All Japan Elementary School Student Kurashiki Ōshō Tournament in 2006 as a sixth-grader. Later that same year, he was accepted into the Japan Shogi Association's apprentice school as a student of shogi professional Osamu Nakamura at the rank of 6-kyū.

Abe advanced through the apprentice school fairly smoothly, being promoted to the rank of 1-dan in 2008, and then to 3-dan in 2009. He obtained full professional status and the rank of 4-dan after tying for first place in the 48th 3-dan League (October 2010 – March 2011) in 2011 with a record of 13 wins and 5 losses.

== Shogi professional ==
In 2013, Abe was one of five shogi professionals selected to play against five computer shogi programs in the 2nd Denōsen exhibition match . Abe defeated the computer program Shūso in the first game of the match, which turned out to be the only victory scored by the shogi professionals.

In October 2014, Abe defeated Yūki Sasaki to 2 games to 1 to win the 45th Shinjin-Ō tournament.

=== Promotion history ===
Abe's promotion history is as follows.

- 6-kyū: September 2006
- 3-dan: April 2009
- 4-dan: April 1, 2011
- 5-dan: November 4, 2014
- 6-dan: November 5, 2015
- 7-dan: January 28, 2022

=== Titles and other championships ===
Abe has yet to appear in a major title match, but he has won one non-major title championship.
