= Akira Shima =

Japanese shogi player (born 1963)

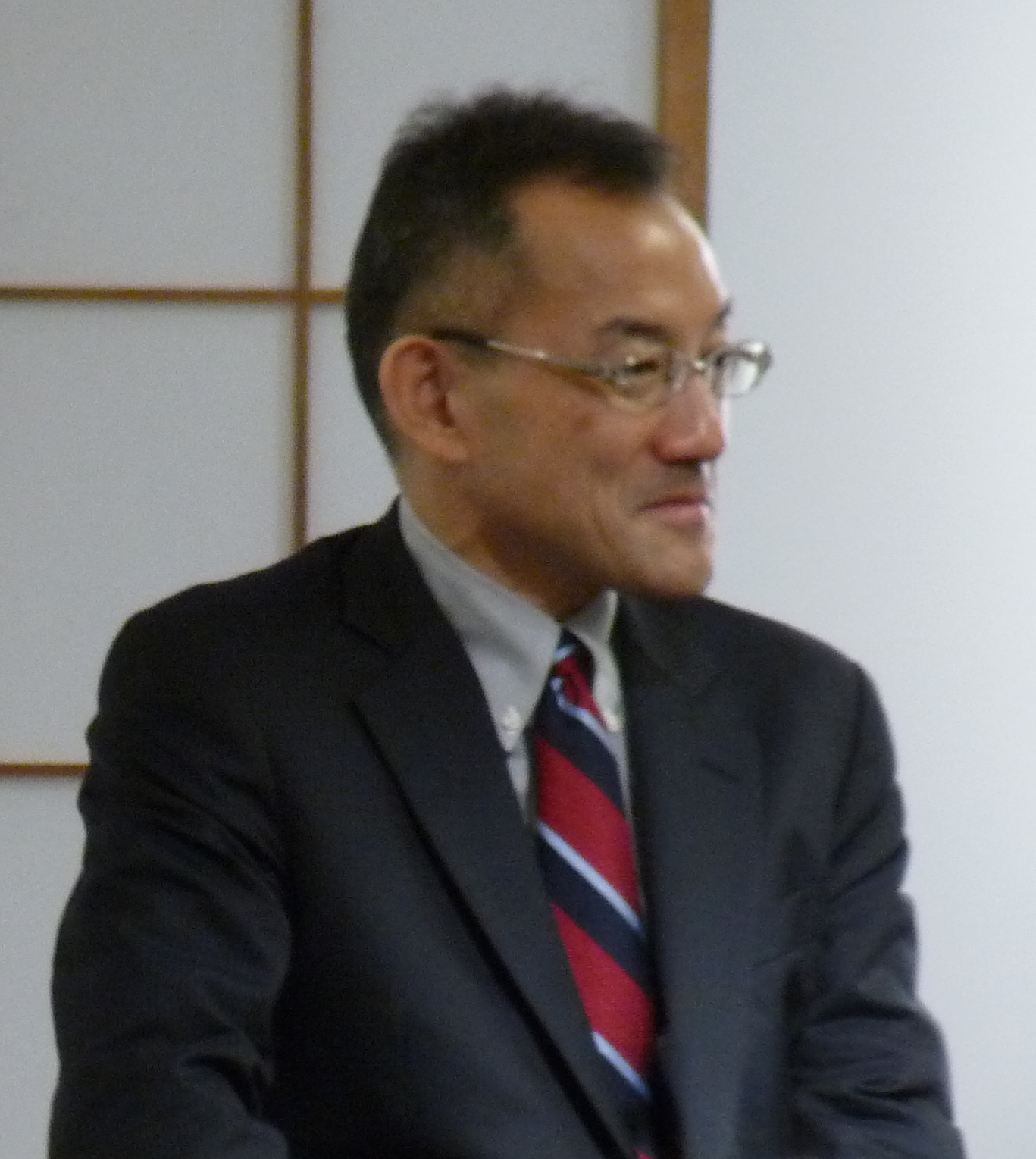
- Native name: 島朗
- Born: February 19, 1963 (age 63)
- Hometown: Setagaya

Career
- Achieved professional status: September 18, 1980 (aged 17)
- Badge number: 146
- Rank: 9-dan
- Teacher: Toshio Takayanagi (Honorary 9-dan)
- Major titles won: 1
- Tournaments won: 3
- Meijin class: C2
- Ryūō class: 6
- Notable students: Miyu Mizumachi

Websites
- JSA profile page

Akira Shima (島 朗, Shima Akira; February 19, 1963) is a Japanese professional shogi player, ranked 9-dan. He was the first Ryūō title holder and is also a former managing director of the Japan Shogi Association.

== Shogi professional ==
Shima is a member of the so-called Shōwa 55 group (55年組), a group of eight strong players that become professional in 1980–1981 (year 55 of the Shōwa period) and won numerous shogi tournaments. Others in the group include Yoshikazu Minami, Osamu Nakamura, Michio Takahashi, Yasuaki Tsukada, Hiroshi Kamiya, Masaki Izumi, and Yūji Yoda.

On February 6, 2018, Shima defeated Keita Kadokura in a Meijin Class C1 league game to become the 21st person to win 800 official games as a professional, and was awarded the "Shogi Honor Fighting-spirit Award" as a result.

=== Promotion history ===
The promotion history for Shima is as follows:

- 6-kyū: 1975
- 1-dan: 1977
- 4-dan: September 18, 1980
- 5-dan: May 10, 1984
- 6-dan: April 1, 1986
- 7-dan: April 1, 1989
- 8-dan: April 1, 1994
- 9-dan: April 17, 2008

=== Titles and other championships ===
Shima has appeared in major title matches 6 times, but his only title victory came in 1st Ryūō title match in 1988. Shima also won the now defunct All Star Kachinuki-sen 3 times (1982, 1985–86) for his only other shogi championships during his career.

=== Awards and honors ===
Shima has received a number awards and honors throughout his career for his accomplishments both on an off the shogi board. These include awards given out annually by the JSA for performance in official games as well as other awards for achievement.

==== Annual shogi awards ====
- 12th Annual Awards (April 1984 – March 1985): Best New Player, Most Games Won
- 16th Annual Awards (April 1988 – March 1989): Distinguished Service

==== Other awards ====
- 2004: Shogi Honor Award (Awarded by the JSA in recognition of winning 600 official games as a professional)
- 2005: 25 Years Service Award (Awarded by the JSA in recognition of being an active professional for twenty-five years)
- 2018, February: Shogi Honor Fighting-spirit Award (Awarded by JSA in recognition of winning 800 official games as a professional)

== JSA director ==
Shima has served on the Japan Shogi Association's board of directors on multiple occasions. He was first elected as a director at the association's 56th General Meeting for a two-year term on May 26, 2005. In May 2011, Shima was re-elected to the board of directors once again, but this time as a non-executive director. He was re-elected as a director in June 2013 and 2015, but was selected to be a managing director each time. He announced his resignation in January 2017 to accept responsibility for the association's handling of the 29th Ryūō challenger controversy.
