= Natsuko Fujimori =

- Native name: 藤森奈津子
- Born: August 2, 1961 (age 64)
- Hometown: Shiki, Saitama

Career
- Achieved professional status: November 8, 1979 (aged 18)
- Badge Number: JSA W-13; LPSA W-5
- Rank: Women's 4-dan
- Retired: March 31, 2010 (aged 48)
- Teacher: Nobuyuki Ōuchi (9-dan)
- Career record: 186–263 (.414)

Websites
- LPSA profile page

Natsuko Fujimori (藤森 奈津子, Fujimori Natsuko; born August 2, 1961) is a retired Japanese women's professional shogi player ranked 4-dan.

== Women's shogi professional ==
=== Promotion history ===
Fujimori's promotion history was as follows.

- 1979, November 8: 2-kyū
- 1980, February 26: 1-dan
- 1989, May 22: 2-dan
- 2000, April 1: 3-dan
- 2010, April: 4-dan

Note: All ranks are women's professional ranks.

=== Awards and honors ===
Fujimori received the Japan Shogi Association's received the "25 Years Service Award" in recognition of being an active professional for twenty-five years in 2003.

== Personal life ==
Fujimori's son Tetsuya is also a professional shogi player. The two are the only mother and son to be awarded professional shogi player status.
