= Tetsuya Fujimori =

Japanese shogi player

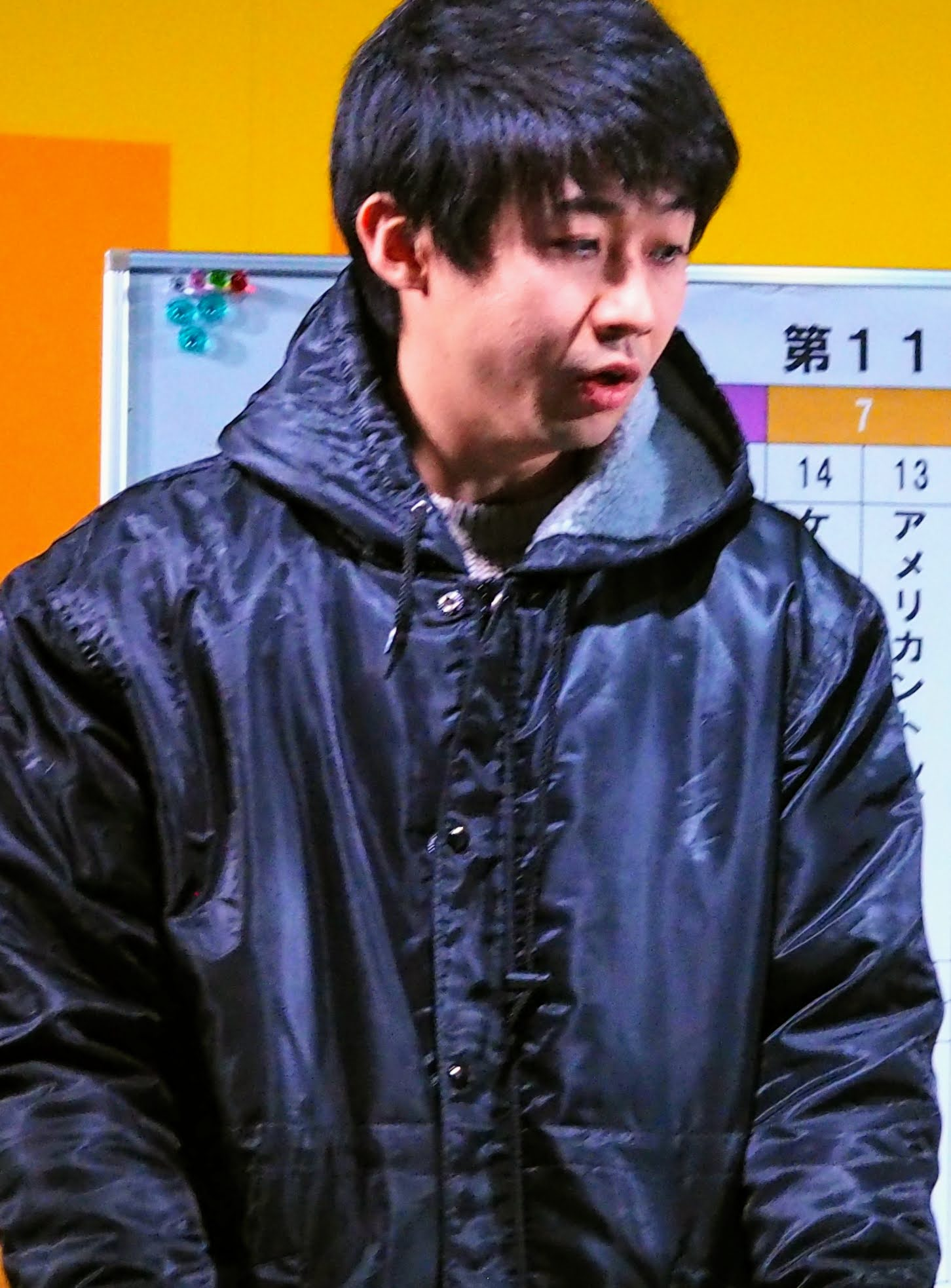
- Native name: 藤森哲也
- Born: May 9, 1987 (age 38)
- Hometown: Ōta, Tokyo, Japan

Career
- Achieved professional status: October 1, 2011 (aged 24)
- Badge Number: 285
- Rank: 6-dan
- Teacher: Yasuaki Tsukada (9-dan)
- Meijin class: C2
- Ryūō class: 5

Websites
- JSA profile page
- Tetsuya Fujimori on Twitter

Tetsuya Fujimori (藤森 哲也, Fujimori Tetsuya; born May 9, 1987) is a Japanese professional shogi player ranked 6-dan.

== Early life and apprenticeship ==
Fujimori was born in Ōta, Tokyo on May 9, 1987. He learned shogi from his mother Natsuko, who is a retired women's shogi professional, at an early age and eventually was accepted into the Japan Shogi Association's apprentice school at the rank of 6-kyū under the tutelage of shogi professional Yasuaki Tsukada in 1999.

Fujimori was promoted to the rank of apprentice professional 3-dan in 2007, and full professional status and the rank of 4-dan in 2011 after finishing the 49th 3-dan League (April 2011 – September 2011) in second place with a record of 12 wins and 6 losses.

== Shogi professional ==
Fujimori finished runner-up in the Shinjin-Ō tournament twice. He lost the 43rd Shinjin-Ō match to Takuya Nagase 2 games to 1 in October 2012, and then 44th Shinjin-Ō match to Ryūma Tonari by the same score in October of the following year.

=== Promotion history ===
The promotion history for Fujimori is as follows:

- 6-kyū: September 1999
- 3-dan: October 2007
- 4-dan: October 1, 2011
- 5-dan: March 23, 2017
- 6-dan: February 27, 2026

== Personal life ==
Fujimori's and his mother are the only mother–son pair to become professional shogi players. His father is also a strong amateur shogi player.
