= Hana Wada =

Japanese shogi player (born 2002)

- Native name: 和田はな
- Born: January 14, 2002 (age 23)
- Hometown: Wakō, Saitama, Japan

Career
- Achieved professional status: September 1, 2020 (aged 18)
- Badge Number: W-69
- Rank: Women's 1-kyū
- Teacher: Yūki Fujikura (6-dan)

Websites
- JSA profile page

Hana Wada (和田 はな, Wada Hana; born January 14, 2002) is a Japanese women's professional shogi player ranked 1-kyū.

== Early life, education and amateur shogi ==
Wada was born in Wakō, Saitama on January 14, 2002. She became interested in shogi from watching her father, older brother and older sister play when she about five years old, and entered the Japan Shogi Association's training group system in 2011 as a student of shogi professional Yūki Fujikura in October 2011 when she was nine years old. As a sixth grade elementary school student, she won the 7th Girl's Elementary School Student Meijin Tournament in 2013. Wada won the 46th Women's Amateur Meijin tournament, and finished second in girl's division of the 35th All-Japan Junior High School Student Championships in 2014 as a twelve-year-old first grade junior high school student.

Wada's plan to become a women's professional shogi player, however, was put on hold when she moved to Houston with her parents due to her father's work. While living in Houston she continued to play shogi and won the United States Shogi Championship in 2018 when she was fifteen years old. After returning to Japan, she won the 27th All-Japan Girl's High School Invitational Tournament in January 2019 as second year high school student.

Wada qualified for the rank of women's professional 2-kyū in July 2020 after being promoted to training group B2. She applied for women's professional status and her application was accepted by the Japan Shogi Association; she was granted women's professional status on September 1, 2020.

After graduating from high school, Wada was accepted into the School of Social Sciences of Waseda University.

== Women's shogi professional ==
=== Promotion history ===
Wada's promotion history is as follows:

- 2-kyū: September 1, 2020
- 1-kyū: May 28, 2021

Note: All ranks are women's professional ranks.

== Personal life ==
Wada's older sister Aki is also a women's professional shogi player, and the two are the fourth pair of sisters to be awarded women's professional shogi player status.
