= Michio Takahashi =

Japanese shogi player

- Native name: 高橋道雄
- Born: April 23, 1960 (age 65)
- Hometown: Tokyo Metropolis, Japan

Career
- Achieved professional status: June 4, 1980 (aged 20)
- Badge Number: 142
- Rank: 9-dan
- Teacher: Yūji Sase (Honorary 9-dan)
- Major titles won: 5
- Tournaments won: 3
- Meijin class: C2
- Ryūō class: 4
- Notable students: Ryōsuke Nakamura; Reo Kurosawa; Shino Miyasō; Momoko Nakamura

Websites
- JSA profile page

Michio Takahashi (高橋 道雄, Takahashi Michio; born April 23, 1960) is a Japanese professional shogi player ranked 9-dan. He is a former holder of the Tenth Dan, Ōi, and Kiō titles.

== Early life and apprenticeship ==
Takahashi was born on April 23, 1960, in Tokyo. He learned how to play shogi when he was twelve years old, and entered the Japan Shogi Association's apprentice school when he was fifteen years old at the rank of 6-kyū as a protegee of shogi professional Yūji Sase in 1975.

Takahashi was promoted to the rank of 1-dan in 1977 and then 3-dan in 1979 before obtaining full professional status and the rank of 4-dan in June 1980.

== Shogi professional ==
Takahashi is a member of the so-called Shōwa 55 group (55年組 (Gojūgonengumi)), a group of eight strong players that became professionals between April 1, 1980, and March 31, 1981, (Year 55 of the Shōwa period) and won numerous shogi tournaments. Others in the group include Yoshikazu Minami, Osamu Nakamura, Akira Shima, Yasuaki Tsukada, Hiroshi Kamiya, Masaki Izumi, and Yūji Yoda.

=== Promotion history ===
Takahashi's promotion history is as follows:

- 6-kyū: 1975
- 1-dan: 1977
- 4-dan: June 4, 1980
- 5-dan: April 1, 1982
- 6-dan: April 1, 1984
- 7-dan: November 17, 1986
- 8-dan: April 1, 1989
- 9-dan: April 1, 1990

=== Titles and other championships ===
Takahashi has appeared in major title matches a total of ten times and has won five titles. In addition to major titles, he has won three other shogi championships during his career.

==== Major titles ====
Title	Years	Number of times overall
Ōi	1983, 1985–86	3
Kiō	1986	1
^{*}Tenth Dan (Note: The Tenth Dan title became the Ryūō title in 1988. Takahashi is the last person to hold the title.)	1997	1

Note: Tournaments marked with an asterisk (*) are no longer held.

==== Other championships ====
Tournament	Years	Number of times
Nihon Series	1988	1
^{*}Tenno-sen	1986, 1992	2

Note: Tournaments marked with an asterisk (*) are no longer held.

=== Awards and honors ===
Takahashi received the Japan Shogi Association Annual Shogi Awards for "Best New Player" (1983), the "Technique Award" (1985), "Player of the Year" (1986) and "Most Games Played" (1987). He also received the association's "Shogi Honor Award" in 2000 for winning 600 official games, the "25 Years Service Award" in 2005 for being an active professional for twenty-five years, and the "Shogi Honor Fighting-spirit Award" in 2014 for winning 800 official games.

=== Year-end prize money and game fee ranking ===
Takahashi has finished in the "Top 10" of the JSA's year-end prize money and game fee rankings four times since 1993. His highest finish came in 1996 when he finished fourth.

Year	Amount	Rank
1994	¥22,310,000	8th
1995	¥9,660,000	9th
1996	¥31,110,000	4th
1997	¥19,240,000	10th

- Note: All amounts are given in Japanese yen and include prize money and fees earned from official tournaments and games held from January 1 to December 31.
