= Wataru Kamimura =

Japanese shogi player (born 1986)

- Native name: 上村亘
- Born: December 10, 1986 (age 38)
- Hometown: Nakano, Tokyo, Japan

Career
- Achieved professional status: October 1, 2012 (aged 25)
- Badge Number: 288
- Rank: 5-dan
- Teacher: Osamu Nakamura (9-dan)
- Meijin class: C2
- Ryūō class: 6

Websites
- JSA profile page
- Official website

Wataru Kamimura (上村 亘, Kamimura Wataru; born December 10, 1986) is a Japanese professional shogi player ranked 5-dan.

== Early life and apprenticeship ==
Kamimura was born in Nakano, Tokyo on December 10, 1986. He learned how to play shogi from his father and entered the Japan Shogi Association's apprentice school at the rank of 6-kyū under the guidance of professional shogi player Osamu Nakamura in September 1998.

Kamimura was promoted to the rank of apprentice professional 3-dan in October 2010, and obtained full professional status and the rank of 4-dan in October 2012 after winning the 51st 3-dan League (April 2012 – September 2012) with a record of 14 wins and 4 losses.

== Shogi professional ==
=== Promotion history ===
The promotion history for Kamimura is as follows:

- 6-kyū: September 1998
- 3-dan: October 2010
- 4-dan: October 1, 2012
- 5-dan: October 10, 2019

== Personal life ==
Kamimura is a graduate of Keio University, majoring in mathematical sciences. He is the first professional shogi player to graduate from the school.
