= Fujikura (surname) =

Fujikura (written: 藤倉) is a Japanese surname. Notable people with the surname include:

- Dai Fujikura (藤倉 大, born 1977), Japanese classical composer
- Mitsuo Fujikura, Japanese mixed martial artist
- Yūki Fujikura (藤倉 勇樹, born 1979), Japanese shogi player
