= Hiroshi Kamiya (disambiguation) =

Hiroshi Kamiya (born 1975) is a Japanese voice actor.

Hiroshi Kamiya may refer to:

- Hiroshi Kamiya (born 1961), Japanese shogi player
- Hiroshi Kamiya (born 1968), Japanese politician
