= Sachiko Takamure =

Japanese shogi player (born 1971)

- Native name: 高群佐知子
- Born: April 1, 1971 (age 54)
- Hometown: Ōmagari, Akita

Career
- Achieved professional status: April 1, 2001 (aged 30)
- Badge Number: W-8
- Rank: Women's 4-dan
- Retired: March 31, 2020 (aged 48)
- Teacher: Seiichirō Taki (8-dan)

Websites
- JSA profile page

Sachiko Takamure (高群 佐知子, Takamure Sachiko; born April 1, 1971) is a Japanese retired women's professional shogi player ranked 4-dan.

== Women's shogi professional ==
=== Promotion history ===
Takamura's promotion history was as follows:

- 1986, March 1: 3-kyū
- 1987, April 1: 1-dan
- 1994, March 22: 2-dan
- 2000, June 30: 3-dan
- 2018, January 21: 4-dan
- 2020, March 31: Retired

Note: All ranks are women's professional ranks.

=== Awards and honors ===
Takamure received the Japan Shogi Association's received the "25 Years Service Award" in recognition of being an active professional for twenty-five years in 2010.

== Personal life ==
Takamure is married to professional shogi player Yasuaki Tsukada, but plays professionally under her maiden name. The couple's daughter Erika is also a women's professional shogi player.
