= Ichitarō =

Ichitarō (also Ichitaro, Ichitarou, Ichitaroh) may refer to:

== People ==
- Ichitarō Doi, (土居 市太郎, 1887–1973) Japanese professional shogi player

== Other uses ==
- Ichitaro (word processor), software
