= Yoshikazu Minami (shogi) =

Japanese shogi player (born 1963)

- Native name: 南芳一
- Born: June 8, 1963 (age 62)
- Hometown: Kishiwada, Osaka

Career
- Achieved professional status: January 19, 1981 (aged 17)
- Badge Number: 147
- Rank: 9-dan
- Teacher: Akira Kinoshita (7-dan)
- Major titles won: 7
- Tournaments won: 6
- Meijin class: Free
- Ryūō class: 6

Websites
- JSA profile page

Yoshikazu Minami (南 芳一, Minami Yoshikazu; June 8, 1963) is a Japanese professional shogi player ranked 9-dan. He is a former Kisei, Kiō, and Ōshō title holder.

== Early life and apprenticeship ==
Minami was born in Kishiwada, Osaka on June 8, 1963. He entered the Japan Shogi Association's apprentice school at the rank of 5-kyū in 1975 as a protegee of shogi professional Akira Kinoshita. He obtained full professional status and the rank of 4-dan in January 1981.

== Shogi professional ==
Minami is a member of the so-called Shōwa 55 group (55年組), a group of eight strong players that become professional in 1980–1981 (year 55 of the Shōwa period) and won numerous shogi tournaments. Others in the group include Osamu Nakamura, Michio Takahashi, Akira Shima, Yasuaki Tsukada, Hiroshi Kamiya, Masaki Izumi, and Yūji Yoda.

In January 2018, Minami became the 20th shogi professional to win 800 official games and be awarded Shogi Honor Fighting-spirit Award by the JSA.

Minami finished the 81st Meijin Ranking League season with a record of 1 wins and 9 losses in Class C2. Since his result earned him a second relegation point, he decided to become "Free class" player instead of risking the automatic relegation that happens when a player receives three relegation points in Class C2.

=== Playing style ===
Minami is known for his steady style of starting games slowly as for his quiet manner and strict seiza posture during games. For these reasons, his style is often referred to as the Jizō-style (地蔵流, Jizōryū) after the Jizō statues common to Japanese Buddhism.

=== Promotion history ===
The promotion history for Minami is as follows:

- 5-kyū: 1977
- 1-dan: 1978
- 4-dan: January 19, 1981
- 5-dan: April 1, 1982
- 6-dan: April 1, 1983
- 7-dan: April 1, 1985
- 8-dan: April 1, 1986
- 9-dan: February 22, 1989

=== Titles and other championships ===
Minami has appeared in major title matches a total of sixteen times, and has won seven major titles. In addition to major titles, Minami has won six non-title championships during his career.

==== Major titles ====
Title	Years	Number of times overall
Ōshō	1987–88, 1990	3
Kisei	!987, 1991	2
Kiō	1988–89	2

==== Other championships ====
Tournament	Years	Number of times
^{*}Young Lions	1982–1983	2
^{*}All Star Kachinuki-sen	1983, 1989, 1993	3
^{*}Hayazashi Senshuken	1989	1

Note: Tournaments marked with an asterisk (*) are no longer held.

=== Awards and honors ===
Minami has received a number of awards and honors throughout his career for his accomplishments both on an off the shogi board. These include awards given out annually by the JSA for performance in official games as well as other JSA awards for career accomplishments, and awards received from governmental organizations, etc. for contributions made to Japanese society.

==== Annual shogi awards ====
- 10th Annual Awards (April 1982 – March 1983): Best New Player, Best Winning Percentage, Most Consecutive Games Won
- 13th Annual Awards (April 1985 – March 1986): Most Consecutive Games Won
- 15th Annual Awards (April 1987 – March 1988): Distinguished Service Award
- 16th Annual Awards (April 1988 – March 1989): Fighting-spirit Award
- 17th Annual Awards (April 1989 – March 1990): Technique Award

==== Other awards ====
- 1988, November: Kishiwada City Meritorious Citizen Award
- 2003: Shogi Honor Award (Awarded by the JSA in recognition of winning 600 official games as a professional)
- 2005: 25 Years Service Award (Awarded by the JSA in recognition of being an active professional for twenty-five years)
- 2018: Shogi Honor Fighting-spirit Award (Awarded by JSA in recognition of winning 800 official games as a professional)
