= Miyu Mizumachi =

Japanese shogi player

- Native name: 水町みゆ
- Born: April 21, 2001 (age 24)
- Hometown: Fukuoka

Career
- Achieved professional status: May 1, 2018 (aged 17)
- Badge Number: W-62
- Rank: Women's 1-dan
- Teacher: Akira Shima (9-dan)

Websites
- JSA profile page

Miyu Mizumachi (水町 みゆ, Mizumachi Miyu; born April 21, 2001) is a Japanese women's professional shogi player ranked 1-dan.

== Women's shogi professional ==
=== Promotion history ===
Mizumachi's promotion history is as follows:

- 2-kyū: May 1, 2018
- 1-kyū: January 18, 2019
- 1-dan: April 1, 2020

Note: All ranks are women's professional ranks.
