= Yūki Fujikura =

Japanese shogi player

- Native name: 藤倉勇樹
- Born: October 23, 1979 (age 45)
- Hometown: Shinjuku

Career
- Achieved professional status: October 1, 2002 (aged 22)
- Badge Number: 245
- Rank: 6-dan
- Retired: April 19, 2022 (aged 42)
- Teacher: Noboru Sakurai (8-dan)
- Career record: 168–236 (.416)
- Notable students: Aki Wada; Hana Wada

Websites
- JSA profile page
- Official website

Yūki Fujikura (藤倉 勇樹, Fujikura Yūki; October 23, 1979) is a Japanese retired professional shogi player who achieved the rank of 6-dan.

== Early life and apprenticeship ==
Yūki Fujikura was born on October 23, 1979, in Shinjuku, Tokyo. He was accepted into the Japan Shogi Association's apprentice school at the rank of 6-kyū as a student of shogi professional Noboru Sakurai in 1992, was promoted to 1-dan in 1998, and finally obtained full professional status and corresponding rank of 4-dan in October 2002 after winning the 31st 3-dan League (April 2002 – October 2002) with a record of 13 wins and 5 losses.

== Shogi professional ==
Fujikura retired from professional shogi on May 19, 2022. He finished his career with a record of 168 wins and 236 losses.

=== Promotion history ===
The promotion history for Fujikura is as follows:

- 6-kyū: 1992
- 1-dan: 1998
- 4-dan: October 1, 2002
- 5-dan: April 22, 2012
- Retired: May 19, 2022
- 6-dan: April 1, 2024
