= Tatsuya Futakami =

Japanese shogi player

- Native name: 二上達也
- Born: January 2, 1932
- Hometown: Hakodate, Hokkaido
- Nationality: Japanese
- Died: November 1, 2016 (aged 84)

Career
- Achieved professional status: April 1, 1950 (aged 18)
- Badge number: 57
- Rank: 9 dan
- Retired: March 1, 1990 (aged 58)
- Teacher: Tōichi Watanabe
- Major titles won: 5
- Tournaments won: 5
- Notable students: Yoshiharu Habu

Websites
- JSA profile page

Tatsuya Futakami (二上 達也, Futakami Tatsuya; January 2, 1932 – November 1, 2016) was a Japanese professional shogi player who achieved the rank of 9-dan. He is a former president of the Japan Shogi Association as well as a former Kisei and Ōshō title holder.
