= Erika Tsukada =

Japanese shogi player (born 1998)

- Native name: 塚田恵梨花
- Born: August 27, 1998 (age 27)
- Hometown: Suginami, Tokyo

Career
- Achieved professional status: October 1, 2014 (aged 16)
- Badge Number: W-51
- Rank: Women's 2-dan
- Teacher: Yasuaki Tsukada (9-dan)

Websites
- JSA profile page

Erika Tsukada (塚田 恵梨花, Tsukada Erika; born August 27, 1998) is a Japanese women's professional shogi player ranked 2-dan.

== Early life ==
Tsukuda was born on August 27, 1998, in Suginami, Tokyo.

== Women's shogi professional ==
=== Promotion history ===
Tsukada's promotion history is as follows:

- 2-kyū: October 1, 2014
- 1-kyū: June 23, 2017
- 1-dan: April 1, 2019
- 2-dan: May 8, 2023

Note: All ranks are women's professional ranks.

== Personal life ==
Tsukuda's father Yasuaki is a professional shogi player and her mother Sachiko is a retired women's professional shogi player.
