= Yasuaki Tsukada =

Japanese shogi player (born 1964)

- Born: November 16, 1964 (age 61)
- Hometown: Tokyo Metropolis

Career
- Achieved professional status: March 5, 1981 (aged 16)
- Badge Number: 148
- Rank: 9-dan
- Teacher: Nobuyuki Ōuchi (9-dan)
- Major titles won: 1
- Tournaments won: 3
- Meijin class: Free
- Ryūō class: 6
- Notable students: Tetsuya Fujimori; Erika Tsukada

Websites
- JSA profile page

Yasuaki Tsukada (塚田 泰明, Tsukada Yasuaki; born November 16, 1964) is a Japanese professional shogi player ranked 9-dan. He is a former Ōza title holder and the inventor of the influential Tsukada Special strategy, which he used to win numerous games in the 1980s, is named after him.

== Early life, amateur shogi and apprenticeship ==
Tsukada was born in Tokyo Metropolis on November 16, 1964. In 1978, he finished runner-up in the 32nd Amateur Meijin Tournament and in November of that same year he entered the Japan Shogi Association's apprentice school at the rank of 4-kyū under the guidance of Nobuyuki Ōuchi.

== Shogi professional ==
Tsukada is a member of the so-called Shōwa 55 group (55年組), a group of eight strong players that become professional in 1980–1981 (Year 55 of the Shōwa period) and won numerous shogi tournaments. Others in the group include Yoshikazu Minami, Osamu Nakamura, Michio Takahashi, Akira Shima, Hiroshi Kamiya, Masaki Izumi, and Yūji Yoda.

Tsukada became the 27th professional to win 800 official games when he defeated women's professional 2-crown Tomoka Nishiyama in a 74th Ōza tournament preliminary round game on September 8, 2025. He was awarded the "Shogi Honor Fighting-spirit Award" as a result.

=== Promotion history ===
The promotion history for Tsukada is as follows:

- 4-kyū: 1978
- 1-dan: 1979
- 4-dan: March 5, 1981
- 5-dan: April 1, 1983
- 6-dan: April 1, 1986
- 7-dan: April 1, 1987
- 8-dan: April 1, 1988
- 9-dan: December 15, 2000

=== Titles and other championships ===
Tsukada has appeared in major title matches twice. He won the 35th Ōza in 1987 for his only major title. In addition to major titles, Tsukada has won three other shogi championships during his career: the Shinjin-Ō in 1986, and the now defunct Quick Play Young Professionals Tournament in 1983 and 1987.

=== Awards and honors ===
Tsukada has received a number awards and honors throughout his career for his accomplishments both on an off the shogi board. These include awards given out annually by the JSA for performance in official games as well as other awards for achievement.

==== Annual Shogi Awards ====
- 13th Annual Awards (April 1985 – March 1986): Technique Award
- 14th Annual Awards (April 1986 – March 1987): Most Consecutive Games Won, Technique Award
- 15th Annual Awards (April 1987 – March 1988): Technique Award
- 42nd Annual Awards (April 2014 – March 2015): Kōzō Masuda Special Award

==== Other awards ====
- 2005: 25 Years Service Award (awarded by the JSA in recognition of being an active professional for twenty-five years)
- 2008: Shogi Honor Award (awarded by the JSA in recognition of winning 600 official games as a professional)
- 2025: Shogi Honor Fighting-spirit Award (awarded by the JSA in recognition of winning 800 official games as a professional)

== Personal life ==
Tsukada is married to retired women's shogi professional Sachiko Takamure. The couple's eldest daughter Erika is also a women's shogi professional.
