= Hiroshi Kamiya (shogi) =

Japanese shogi player

- Native name: 神谷広志
- Born: April 21, 1961 (age 64)
- Hometown: Hamamatsu
- Nationality: Japanese

Career
- Achieved professional status: March 18, 1981 (aged 19)
- Badge Number: 149
- Rank: 8-dan
- Teacher: Hisao Hirotsu (9-dan)
- Meijin class: Free
- Ryūō class: 6

Websites
- JSA profile page

Hiroshi Kamiya (神谷 広志, Kamiya Hiroshi; born April 21, 1961) is a Japanese professional shogi player ranked 8-dan.

== Early life and apprenticeship ==
Kamiya was born in Hamamatsu, Shizuoka Prefecture on April 21, 1961. He entered the Japan Shogi Association's apprentice school at the rank of 5-kyū in 1975 as student of shogi professional Hisao Hirotsu. He obtained full professional status and the rank of 4-dan in March 1981.

== Shogi professional ==
Kamiya is a member of the so-called Shōwa 55 group (55年組), a group of eight strong players that become professional in 1980–1981 (Year 55 of the Shōwa period) and won numerous shogi tournaments. Others in the group include Yoshikazu Minami, Osamu Nakamura, Michio Takahashi, Akira Shima, Yasuaki Tsukada, Masaki Izumi, and Yūji Yoda.

In 1987, Kamiya won twenty-eight consecutive games to set a new professional shogi record for consecutive victories. Kamiya's record stood until June 2017 when it was broken by Sōta Fujii.

In August 2024, Kamiya became the 63rd player to win 600 games as a professional. He received the Japan Shogi Association's "Shogi Honor Fighting-spirit Award" as a result.

=== Promotion history ===
The promotion history for Kamiya is as follows:

- 5-kyū: 1975
- 1-dan: 1978
- 4-dan: March 18, 1981
- 5-dan: April 1, 1984
- 6-dan: March 17, 1989
- 7-dan: December 12, 1997
- 8-dan: May 1, 2014

=== Awards and honors ===
Kamiya received the JSA's Annual Shogi Award for "Most Consecutive Games Won" in 1987. He also received the JSA's "25 Years Service Award" in 2005 in honor of his being an active shogi professional for twenty-five years, and the JSA's "Shogi Honor Fighting-spirit Award" for winning 600 official games as a professional in 2024.
