= Yōryū Fourth File Rook =

Yōryū Fourth File Rook's basic position
☖ pieces in hand: –

9	8	7	6	5	4	3	2	1
香	桂				金	銀	桂	香	1
	飛		銀	金		王	角		2
歩		歩	歩		歩		歩		3
				歩		歩		歩	4
	歩								5
		歩	歩					歩	6
歩	歩	角		歩	歩	歩	歩		7
		銀	飛		金	玉			8
香	桂		金			銀	桂	香	9

☗ pieces in hand: –

In shogi, Yōryū Fourth File Rook (耀龍四間飛車 yōryū shikenbisha) is a Fourth File Rook (Ranging Rook) opening. This strategy was developed by Takahiro Ōhashi, who published a systematic study of it in a book of the same name in 2020. He was awarded the prestigious Masuda Award in 2021 for the development of this tactic.

== Overview ==
This tactic is a similar to a Normal Fourth File Rook opening. Instead of castling the king in a Mino castle, it is castled first in a Cozy castle, from which it can develop into various castles such as an Amano Fortress, Doi Fortress, Right King, Subway Rook, Peerless Golds, etc., depending on the circumstances. The characteristic of the Yōryū Fourth File Rook is that it keeps the position of the king at 38 (72 for White). While moving the king to a place other than 38 to develop the castle is also possible, that is different from the original conception of the Yōryū Fourth File Rook.

The term Yōryū (耀龍 'shining dragon') was coined by Ōhashi to refer to some of his own strategies, and is not the name of the castle for this strategy.

The idea of castling the king in the Cozy castle in normal Fourth File Rook openings has existed since the early days of classical shogi, and has also been used in conventional modern shogi, as attested by numerous examples, and thus, it cannot be said that Ōhashi's Yōryū Fourth File Rook is the first strategy in using it.

However, in Ōhashi's book, he systematically explains for Black and White how to play against rapid attack games (Left Mino Rapid Attack, Left Silver-57 Rapid Attack, Pawn-46 Climbing Silver, Right Silver-57 Rapid Attack, Elmo castle Rapid Attack) and slow games (Static Rook Anaguma, Matsuo Anaguma, Left Mino, Silver Crown, Silver Crown Anaguma), from a position in the Cozy castle with a normal Fourth File Rook. Since there had been no published book that presented such a study until then, it made an impact on the shogi community.

In April 2021, Ōhashi won the Kōzō Masuda Award for his development of this strategy.

== Characteristics ==
Compared to a Mino castle, the 72-King position has some advantages, such as avoiding the bishop's diagonal and being strong against counters when doing edge attacks. In addition, the Cozy castle has a high capability for development. In Yōryū Fourth File Rook, the player takes advantage of the above points to develop the formation as occasion may demand.

It requires careful moves and is played with a slightly more Double Static Rook form than the standard Ranging Rook.
