= Aki Wada =

Japanese shogi player

- Native name: 和田あき
- Born: November 14, 1997 (age 28)
- Hometown: Sapporo, Hokkaido, Japan

Career
- Achieved professional status: August 9, 2014 (aged 16)
- Badge number: W-50
- Rank: Women's 2-dan
- Teacher: Yūki Fujikura (6-dan)

Websites
- JSA profile page

Aki Wada (和田 あき, Wada Aki; born November 14, 1997) is a Japanese women's professional shogi player ranked 2-dan.

== Early life ==
Wada was born in Sapporo, Hokkaido on November 14, 1997. She became interested in shogi when she was about five years old after seeing her father and older brother playing each other. She entered the Japan Shogi Association's training group F1 in 2009 and was awarded women's professional provisional status and the rank of women's professional 3-kyū in April 2014 as a student of shogi professional Yūki Fujikura. She obtained women's professional regular status and the rank of women's professional 2-kyū in August 2014.

== Women's shogi professional ==
=== Promotion history ===
Wada's promotion history is as follows:

- 3-kyū: April 1, 2014
- 2-kyū: August 9, 2014
- 1-dan: November 6, 2014
- 2-dan: June 5, 2023

Note: All ranks are women's professional ranks.

== Personal life ==
Wada's younger sister Hana is also a women's professional shogi player, and the two are the fourth pair of sisters to be awarded women's professional shogi player status.

On June 20, 2025, the JSA announced on its official website that Wada and shogi professional Reo Kurosawa had gotten married. The announcement also satated that Wada would continue to use her maiden name professionally.
