= Takahiro Ōhashi =

Japanese shogi player (born 1992)

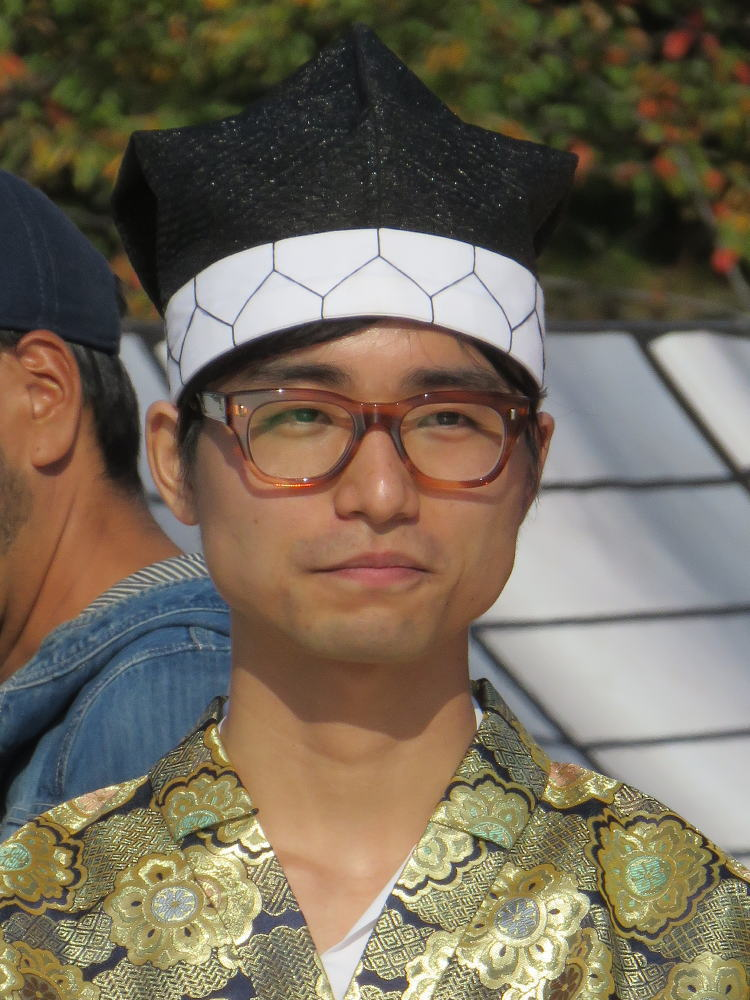
- Ōhashi at a human shogi event in November 2018.
- Native name: 大橋貴洸
- Born: September 22, 1992 (age 34)
- Hometown: Shingū, Wakayama

Career
- Achieved professional status: October 1, 2016 (aged 24)
- Badge number: 308
- Rank: 7-dan
- Teacher: Kazuharu Shoshi (7-dan)
- Tournaments won: 2
- Meijin class: B1
- Ryūō class: 4

Websites
- JSA profile page

Takahiro Ōhashi (大橋 貴洸, Ōhashi Takahiro; September 22, 1992) is a Japanese professional shogi player ranked 7-dan.

== Early life and apprenticeship ==
Ōhashi was born in Shingū, Wakayama on September 22, 1992. He learned how to play shogi as fourth-grade elementary school student, and entered the Japan Shogi Association's apprentice school at the rank of 6-kyū as a student of shogi professional Kazuharu Shoshi in September 2006.

Takahashi was promoted to 3-dan in 2010 and obtained professional status and the rank of 4-dan in October 2016 after finishing runner-up in the 59th 3-dan League (April 2016 – September 2016) with a record of 12 wins and 6 losses.

== Shogi professional ==
Takahashi finished runner-up in the 46th Shinjin-Ō in 2015, losing to Tatsuya Sugai 2 games to 1. Takahashi was still ranked an apprentice professional 3-dan at the time, and won the first game of the match before Sugai came back to win the last two.

Takahashi won his first tournament as a professional in August 2018 when he defeated Seiya Kondō to win the 3rd Yamada Challenge Cup. In October of the same year, he defeated Hirotaka Kajiura 2 games to none to win the 8th Kakogawa Seiryū Tournament.

=== Promotion history ===
The promotion history for Ōhashi is as follows:

- 6-kyū: September 2006
- 3-dan: October 2010
- 4-dan: October 1, 2016
- 5-dan: July 31, 2019
- 6-dan: October 23, 2019
- 7-dan: February 8, 2023

=== Titles and other championships ===
Ōhashi has yet to appear in a major title match, but he has won two non-major title championships.

=== Awards and honors ===
Ōhashi received the Japan Shogi Association Annual Shogi Award for "Best New Player" for the 2018–2019 Shogi Year. He won the Kōzō Masuda Award for developing the Yōryū Fourth File Rook opening in 2020.
