= Ryōsuke Nakamura =

Japanese shogi player (born 1985)

- Native name: 中村亮介
- Born: September 26, 1985 (age 39)
- Hometown: Iruma, Saitama, Japan

Career
- Achieved professional status: April 1, 2004 (aged 18)
- Badge Number: 252
- Rank: 6-dan
- Teacher: Michio Takahashi (9-dan)
- Meijin class: C2
- Ryūō class: 6

Websites
- JSA profile page

Ryōsuke Nakamura (中村 亮介, Nakamura Ryōsuke; born September 26, 1985) is a Japanese professional shogi player ranked 6-dan.

== Early life and apprenticeship ==
Nakamura was born on September 26, 1985, in Iruma, Saitama. He was accepted into the Japan Shogi Association's apprentice school at the rank of 6-kyū as a student of shogi professional Michio Takahashi and quickly progressed, being promoted to the rank of 1-dan in 2000 and then to 3-dan in 2002. He obtained professional status and the rank of 4-dan in April 2004, after finishing second in the 34th 3-dan League (October 2003 – March 2004) with a record of 13 wins and 5 losses.

== Shogi professional ==
=== Promotion history ===
The promotion history for Nakamura is as follows.

- 6-kyū: 1999
- 1-dan: 2000
- 4-dan: April 1, 2004
- 5-dan: October 31, 2008
- 6-dan: September 1. 2016

== Personal life ==
Nakamura's sister Momoko is a women's shogi professional. The two are the second brother and sister pair in professional shogi history to become professionals.
