= Steve Lawrence discography =

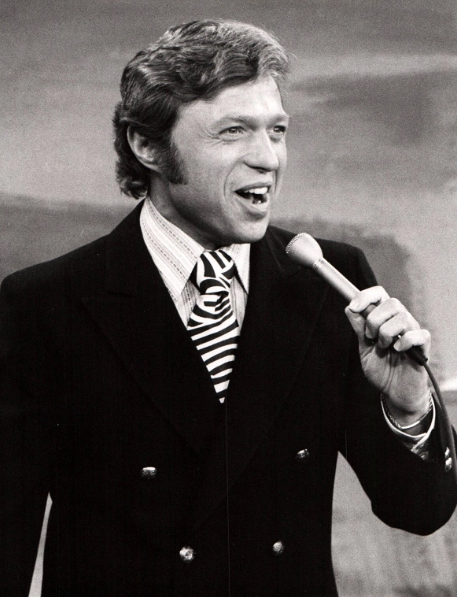
- Steve Lawrence in The New Dick Van Dyke Show (1971)
- Studio albums: 30+
- Soundtrack albums: 2
- Compilation albums: 10+
- Singles: 65
- Other charted songs: 8

This is the discography for American pop musician Steve Lawrence. It contains over 30 studio albums, over 10 compilation albums, 65 singles and other charted songs and released. His debut single was 1952's "Poinciana", released on King Records. It peaked at No. 21 on the US pop charts, becoming his first hit as well. The following single would see less traction, but in 1953, he returned to the charts with "How Many Stars Have to Shine". That year, his debut album was released by the label, titled Steve Lawrence.

During his move to Coral Records in the mid 1950s, he scored more hits. The first few singles seemed to miss the charts and went nowhere, until 1957, when he had a total of 6 hits just that year, including: "The Banana Boat Song" (top-20 pop), "Party Doll" (top-5 pop). Several albums followed the singles, Here's Steve Lawrence and Songs By Steve Lawrence were Coral releases as well. Just like with King, the hits dried up by the next year, and eventually in 1959, he moved to ABC-Paramount where he scored two more immediate top-10 pop hits. But the contract was short-lived and he signed United Artists Records where his "Portrait of My Love" once again hit the top-10 pop charts.

This time, his hit streak continued, and several charting albums came around, too. In 1962, he had his biggest hit with "Go Away Little Girl" which hit number 1 on the pop charts, and number 14 on the R&B charts. Lawrence's best-selling LP was released soon after, titled Winners!. The sequel Academy Award Losers was released two years later. His singles shifted to the easy listening genre, with several top-20 releases in the late 1960s. "Sweet Maria" became his final pop hit in 1967. Lawrence's final charting release came in 1975 with "Now That We're in Love", which hit number 16 on the Billboard Adult Contemporary chart.

== Albums ==
Year	Album	Peak chart positions		Record Label
Year	Album	Billboard 200	Cashbox 100	Record Label
1953	Steve Lawrence	—	—	King
1956	About "That" Girl	—	—	Coral
1957	Songs by Steve Lawrence	—	—	Coral
1958	Here's Steve Lawrence	—	—	Coral
1959	All About Love	—	—	Coral
1959	Swing Softly with Me	—	—	ABC-Paramount
1960	Songs Everybody Knows	73	40	Coral
1960	We Got Us (with Eydie Gormé)	—	—	ABC-Paramount
1960	Steve & Eydie Sing the Golden Hits (with Eydie Gormé)	—	—	ABC-Paramount
1960	Best of Steve Lawrence	—	—	ABC-Paramount
1960	The Steve Lawrence Sound	—	—	United Artists
1960	Steve Lawrence Goes Latin	—	—	United Artists
1961	Portrait of My Love	76	—	United Artists
1961	Our Best to You (with Eydie Gormé)	—	—	ABC-Paramount
1961	Cozy (with Eydie Gormé)	—	—	United Artists
1962	It's Us Again	—	—	Silvikrin
1962	People Will Say We're in Love	—	—	United Artists
1962	Winners!	27	6	Columbia
1962	Come Waltz with Me	—	—	Columbia
1962	Two on the Aisle (with Eydie Gormé)	—	—	United Artists
1963	Steve Lawrence Conquers Broadway	—	—	United Artists
1963	Swinging West	—	—	—
1963	Steve & Eydie at the Movies (with Eydie Gormé)	—	—	—
1964	That Holiday Feeling (with Eydie Gormé)	—	—	—
1964	Academy Award Losers	135	—	Columbia
1964	What Makes Sammy Run?	—	—	Columbia
1965	The Steve Lawrence Show	—	—	Columbia
1965	Steve Lawrence's Greatest Hits	—	—	Columbia
1966	Sings of Love and Sad Young Men	—	97	Columbia
1967	Together on Broadway (with Eydie Gormé)	136	98	Columbia
1967	Bonfá & Brazil (with Eydie Gormé)	—	—	—
1967	Moon River	—	—	Harmony
1968	Golden Rainbow	—	—	—
1969	I've Gotta Be Me	—	—	—
1969	What It Was, Was Love (with Eydie Gormé)	141	—	—
1969	Real True Lovin' (with Eydie Gormé)	188	—	—
1969	Ramblin' Rose	—	—	Harmony
1969	The More I See You	—	—	Vocalion
1970	On a Clear Day – Steve Sings Up a Storm	—	—	—
1970	A Man and a Woman (with Eydie Gormé)	—	—	—
1970	Love Me with All Your Heart	—	—	Harmony
1971	Go Away Little Girl	—	—	Harmony
1972	Portrait of Steve	—	—	MGM
1972	The World Of Steve & Eydie (with Eydie Gormé)	—	—	MGM
1972	Feelin' (with Eydie Gormé)	—	—	Stage 2
1976	Our Love Is Here to Stay: The Gershwin Years (with Eydie Gormé)	—	—	—
1977	Tu Seras Mi Musica	—	—	—
1977	My Way	—	—	—
1981	Take It On Home	—	—	—
1984	Hallelujah (with Eydie Gormé)	—	—	—
1984	Through the Years (with Eydie Gormé)	—	—	—
1989	Alone Together (with Eydie Gormé)	—	—	—
2000	Greatest 20th Century Songs	—	—	—
2000	Warm Hours	—	—	—
2001	Academy Award Losers + 7 Bonus Tracks	—	—	—
2001	Songs My Friends Made Famous	—	—	—
2001	Sings of Love & Sad Young Men / Portrait of Steve	—	—	—
2003	Steve Lawrence Sings Sinatra	—	—	—
2005	Winners! / On a Clear Day	—	—	—
2005	Love Songs from the Movies	—	—	—
2005	The Steve Lawrence Sound / Portrait of My Love	—	—	—
2009	The Steve Lawrence Show + 4 Bonus Tracks	—	—	—
2013	Definitive Collection	—	—	Marginal (Belgium)
2014	When You Come Back to Me Again	—	—	—
2014	Steve Lawrence Conquers Broadway	—	—	—
2014	Walking Proud: The Teen / Pop Sides 1959–1966	—	—	—
2024	Winners! / Come Waltz with Me	—	—	Sepia (UK)

== Singles ==
List of singles, with selected chart positions, showing other relevant details
Single (A-side, B-side) Both sides from same album except where indicated	Year	Chart positions					Album
Single (A-side, B-side) Both sides from same album except where indicated	Year	US	CB	US AC	US R&B	UK	Album
"Poinciana" b/w "Never Leave Me"	1952	21	—	—	—	—	Steve Lawrence
"All My Love Belongs to You" b/w "Mine and Mine Alone" (from Steve Lawrence)	1952	—	—	—	—	—	Non-album track
"How Many Stars Have to Shine" b/w "Tango of Roses"	1953	26	—	—	—	—	Steve Lawrence
"To the Birds" b/w "With Every Breath I Take" (from Steve Lawrence)	1953	—	—	—	—	—	Non-album track
"King for a Day" b/w "You Can't Hold a Memory in Your Arms" (Non-album track)	1953	—	—	—	—	—	Steve Lawrence
"Too Little Time" b/w "Remember Me (You Taught Me to Love)"	1954	—	—	—	—	—	Non-album tracks
"I Need" b/w "Liebchen" (Non-album track)	1954	—	—	—	—	—	Steve Lawrence
"Adelaide" b/w "The Lord Is a Busy Man" (Non-album track)	1955	—	—	—	—	—	Songs By Steve Lawrence
"The Chicken and The Hawk" b/w "Speedo"	1955	—	—	—	—	—	Non-album tracks
"The Banana Boat Song" b/w Long Before I Knew You"	1957	18	5	—	—	—	Songs By Steve Lawrence
"Party Doll" /	1957	5	1	—	—	—	Songs By Steve Lawrence
"(The Bad Donkey) Pum-Pa-Lum"	1957	45	—	—	—	—	Songs By Steve Lawrence
"Can't Wait for Summer" /	1957	42	38	—	—	—	Songs By Steve Lawrence
"Fabulous"	1957	71	—	—	—	—	Songs By Steve Lawrence
"Fraulein" b/w "Blue Rememberin' You" (Non-album track)	1957	54	41	—	—	—	Here's Steve Lawrence
"At a Time Like This" b/w "A Long Last Look"	1957	—	—	—	—	—	Non-album tracks
"Geisha Girl" b/w "I Don't Know"	1957	—	—	—	—	—	Non-album tracks
"Uh-Huh, Oh Yeah" b/w "Lover in the House" (from All About Love)	1958	73	52	—	—	—	Non-album tracks
"Stranger in Mexico" b/w "Those Nights at the Round Table"	1958	—	—	—	—	—	Non-album tracks
"Many a Time" b/w "All About Love" (from All About Love)	1958	97	100	—	—	—	Non-album tracks
"Lover in the House" b/w "Blah-Blah-Blah"	1959	—	—	—	—	—	All About Love
"(I Don't Care) Only Love Me" b/w "Loving Is a Way of Living"	1959	62	72	—	—	—	The Best of Steve Lawrence
"There'll Be Some Changes Made" b/w "You're Everything Wonderful"	1959	—	—	—	—	—	Swing Softly with Me
"Pretty Blue Eyes" b/w "You're Nearer"	1959	9	7	—	—	—	The Best of Steve Lawrence
"Footsteps" b/w "You Don't Know"	1960	7	9	—	—	4	The Best of Steve Lawrence
"Girls, Girls, Girls" b/w "Little Boy Blue"	1960	—	82	—	—	49	Non-album tracks
"Why, Why, Why" b/w "You're Everything Wonderful" (from Swing Softly with Me)	1960	—	110	—	—	—	The Best of Steve Lawrence
"Come Back Silly Girl" b/w "Going Steady" (Non-album track)	1960	—	112	—	—	—	The Best of Steve Lawrence
"Hansel and Gretel" b/w "Tears from Heaven"	1960	—	122	—	—	—	Non-album tracks
"Portrait of My Love" b/w "Oh How You Lied" (Non-album track)	1961	9	11	—	—	—	Portrait of My Love
"My Clair De Lune" /	1961	68	88	13	—	—	The Very Best of Steve Lawrence
"In Time"	1961	94	90	19	—	—	Non-album track
"Somewhere Along the Way" b/w "While There's Still Time"	1961	67	104	16	—	—	The Very Best of Steve Lawrence
"Our Concerto" b/w "Send Someone to Love Me"	1962	107	116	—	—	—	Non-album tracks
"The Lady Wants to Twist" b/w "Tell Her I Said Hello"	1962	120	144	—	—	—	Non-album tracks
"House Without Windows" b/w "The Endless Night"	1962	—	132	—	—	—	Non-album tracks
"Go Away Little Girl" b/w "If You Love Her Tell Her So" (Non-album track)	1962	1	1	1	14	—	Winners!
"Don't Be Afraid, Little Darlin'" b/w "Don't Come Running Back"	1963	26	19	12	—	—	Non-album tracks
"Poor Little Rich Girl" /	1963	27	36	11	—	—	Non-album tracks
"More"	1963	117	113	—	—	—	Everybody Knows
"Walking Proud" b/w "All the Way Home"	1963	26	27	—	—	—	Non-album tracks
"My Home Town" /	1964	106	113	—	—	—	"What Makes Sammy Run?" Original Broadway Cast soundtrack
"A Room Without Windows"	1964	120	tag	—	—	—	"What Makes Sammy Run?" Original Broadway Cast soundtrack
"Everybody Knows" b/w "One Love Too Late" (Non-album track)	1964	72	57	18	—	—	Everybody Knows
"Yet...I Know" b/w "Put Away Your Teardrops" (Non-album track)	1964	77	68	15	—	—	Everybody Knows
"Bewitched..." /	1965	103	—	—	—	—	Non-album tracks
"I Will Wait for You"	1965	113	113	—	—	—	Non-album tracks
"Last Night I Made a Little Girl Cry" /	1965	126	tag	—	—	—	Non-album tracks
"Where Can I Go"	1965	—	106	—	—	—	Steve Lawrence's Greatest Hits
"Millions of Roses" b/w "The Sounds of Summer" (Non-album track)	1965	106	118	11	—	—	The Steve Lawrence Show
"The Week-End" /	1966	131	117	24	—	—	Non-album tracks
"Only the Young"	1966	—	128	—	—	—	Non-album tracks
"The Ballad of the Sad Young Men" b/w "I'm a Fool to Want You"	1966	—	—	36	—	—	Steve Lawrence Sings of Love and Sad Young Men
"I'm Making the Same Mistakes Again" b/w "Today Will Be Yesterday Tomorrow"	1966	—	—	—	—	—	Non-album tracks
"The Warm Hours" b/w "Good Times" (from Love and Sad Young Men)	1966	—	—	—	—	—	The Steve Lawrence Show
"The Girl in the White Glove" b/w "Did I Ever Really Live"	1967	—	—	—	—	—	Non-album tracks
"Sweet Maria" b/w "The Impossible Dream"	1967	—	137	23	—	—	Steve Lawrence's Greatest Hits
"You've Got to Learn" b/w "Remember When"	1967	—	—	—	—	—	Non-album tracks
"I've Gotta Be Me" b/w "Life's a Gamble" (Non-album track)	1967	—	—	6	—	—	"Golden Rainbow" Original Broadway Cast soundtrack
"I Want to Be with You" b/w "Dulcinea" (Non-album track)	1968	—	—	—	—	—	Steve Lawrence's Greatest Hits
"Runaround" b/w "I'm Falling Down (Into Wonderland)"	1968	—	—	27	—	—	Non-album tracks
"The Drifter" b/w "To Say Goodbye"	1969	—	—	14	—	—	Non-album tracks
"Pickin' Up the Pieces" b/w "I've Got My Eyes on You"	1969	—	—	—	—	—	I've Gotta Be Me
"Mama, A Rainbow" b/w "Cry for Us All" (Non-album track)	1970	—	—	38	—	—	On a Clear Day Steve Lawrence Sings Up a Storm
"Groovin'" b/w "Being Alive"	1970	—	—	25	—	—	Non-album tracks
"Lookin' Good" b/w "Frosty Morning"	1971	—	—	—	—	—	Non-album tracks
"Ain't No Sunshine/You Are My Sunshine" b/w "In My Own Lifetime"	1972	—	—	24	—	—	Non-album tracks
"Hello, Los Angeles" b/w "The Best Thing That Ever Happened"	1973	—	—	—	—	—	Non-album tracks
"The End (At The End of a Rainbow)" b/w "You Light Up My Life"	1973	—	—	46	—	—	Non-album tracks
"Now That We're in Love" b/w "I Just Need Your Lovin'"	1975	—	—	16	—	—	Non-album tracks
"You Take My Heart Away" b/w "(Everybody Has To) Begin, Again"	1976	—	—	—	—	—	Non-album tracks
"We're in L.A."	1984	—	—	—	—	—	Non-album tracks
