= KouichiTV =

Japanese YouTuber, filmmaker, and writer (born 1996)

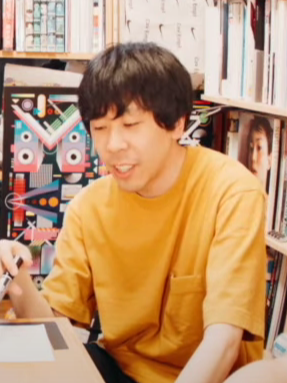
- Takahashi in 2019
- Born: Kōichi Takahashi; May 29, 1996 (age 30); Hokkaido, Japan
- Other name: Kouichi
- Education: Sapporo University
- Occupations: YouTuber; filmmaker; writer
- Years active: 2012–present
- Agent: Uuum

YouTube information
- Channel: kouichitv
- Genres: Sketch comedy; horror
- Subscribers: 912 thousand
- Views: 602 million
- Last updated: August 5, 2026

Signature
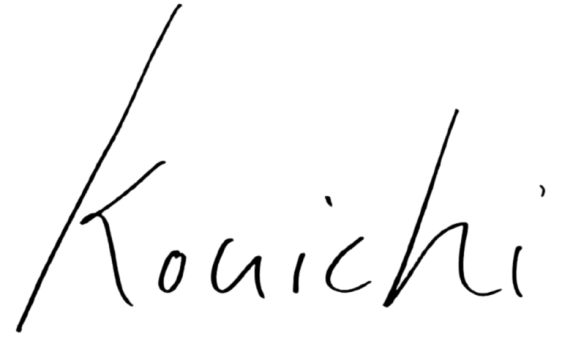

Kōichi Takahashi (髙橋 晃一, Takahashi Kōichi; born May 29, 1996), better known as KouichiTV (コウイチTV, Kōichi Tībī) or Kouichi (コウイチ), is a Japanese YouTuber, filmmaker, and writer from Hokkaido Prefecture. He creates sketch comedy videos on YouTube which feature surreal humor and eccentric characters. Takahashi also produces horror films and won the Hokkaido Media Award at the 2018 Sapporo International Short Film Festival for Saiaku na Ichinichi. His debut feature-length film, Captured!, premiered in January 2026.

== Life, career, and content ==
Kōichi Takahashi was born in Hokkaido Prefecture, Japan, on May 29, 1996. He created his YouTube channel, kouichitv, on July 3, 2012, while in his first year of high school. Takashi attended Sapporo University, where he studied cross-cultural communication. Although he described his initial earnings from YouTube as comparable to an allowance, his channel saw a rise in viewership towards the end of his studies; around the same time, he was invited into Uuum, a multi-channel network for content creators. Since the visual arts company at which he interned did not allow for side jobs, Takahashi decided to exclusively pursue YouTube.

The videos on KouichiTV typically consists of short sketches with surreal comedy, and often feature eccentric characters in unusual situations. In a video from 2022, Takahashi played a video game NPC who gets increasingly irritated and confrontational as the player skips his dialogue. In another video from 2025, he portrayed a YouTuber who gives a room tour but with excessively bright lighting; although the viewer can not see because of the light, the YouTuber supposedly showcases luxury cars and meets with Elon Musk. Other videos are set within what-if scenarios, such as a world where rock paper scissors becomes the method of legal regulation. Takahashi has utilized elements of psychological horror and often includes pyscopathic characters within the sketches.

=== Filmmaking ===
Takahashi produced student films while attending Sapporo University. He created the short film Rifujin na Otoko, which was amongst three recipients at the 2017 Sapporo Film Contest by the Sapporo Film Commission. In 2018, he directed Saiku na Ichinichi, a comedic short film about a man who experiences his most unluckiest day after his fortune is read on television. The five-minute film won the Hokkaido Media Award at the Sapporo International Short Film Festival.

On October 31, 2021, Takahashi directed the short horror film Kienai, produced in partnership with Saitama Prefecture. The film, which was uploaded to the KouichiTV channel, was ranked by Gizmodo Japan's Yatagai as one of the best horror videos on YouTube in 2023. In October 2025, Takahashi directed and wrote the 30-episode vertical video horror comedy series Bunny Kitchen for DMM TV's DMM Shorts. It follows a group of people who are trapped within a nighttime abandoned shopping mall and are chased by a man in a bunny mascot suit.

Takahashi's debut full-length horror film, Captured!, premiered in Japanese theaters on January 16, 2026. The film will follow a third-year high school student, who is haunted by a masked "god" after a spirit was captured in the background of a viral vlog she posted to social media. According to Gadget News, it is the first feature-length film directed by a Japanese YouTuber.

=== Writing ===
In March 17, 2021, Takahashi released the book Saiaku na Ichinichi – the same title as his short film – via Kadokawa. It is a "fake essay" from the perspective of a man who is irritated by small annoyances in everyday life. A series of short stories written by Takahashi, Spin-off na Machi, was serialized in Da Vinci magazine. After a year of print, a tankōbon volume titled Keikaku-sho was released on March 1, 2023. The stories take place within a once peaceful town where strange incidents suddenly appear in succession. Two police officers investigate an abandoned home and find a book titled Keikaku-sho, which seems to reflect the incidents in the town.

== Filmography ==
Year	Title	Network/distributor	Notes	Ref.
2017	Rifujin na Otoko (理不尽な男; lit. 'Unreasonable Man')	—N/a	Short film	
2018	Saiaku na Ichinichi (最悪な1日; lit. 'The Worst Day')	—N/a	Short film	
2021	Kienai (消えない; lit. 'Not Disappear')	—N/a	Short film	
2025	Bunny Kitchen (バニーキッチン, Banī Kicchin)	DMM Shorts	30-short episode series	
2026	Captured! (とれ!, Tore!)	Kadokawa	Feature-length film	

== Bibliography ==
- Kouichi (March 17, 2021). Saiaku na Ichinichi (最悪な一日; lit. 'The Worst Day'). Kadokawa. ISBN 9784046800190.
- Kouichi (March 1, 2023). Keikaku-sho (計画書; lit. 'The Script'). Kadokawa. ISBN 9784046820839.

== Awards and nominations ==
Year	Ceremony	Category	Nominated work	Result	Ref.
2017	Sapporo Film Contest	Sapporo Film Contest Award	Rifujin na Otoko	Won	
2018	Sapporo International Short Film Festival	Hokkaido Media Award	Saiaku na Ichinichi	Won	

== See also ==
- List of YouTubers
- Owarai, Japanese comedy
- SungWon Cho, an American voice actor who makes intentionally low-budget short sketches
