= Momoko Nakamura =

Japanese shogi player (born 1987)

- Native name: 中村桃子
- Born: November 30, 1987 (age 37)
- Hometown: Iruma, Saitama

Career
- Achieved professional status: October 1, 2013 (aged 25)
- Badge Number: W-38
- Rank: Women's 2-dan
- Teacher: Michio Takahashi (9-dan)

Websites
- JSA profile page

Momoko Nakamura (中村 桃子, Nakamura Momoko; born November 30, 1987) is a Japanese retired women's professional shogi player who achieved the rank of 2-dan.

== Women's shogi professional ==
On July 1, 2024, the JSA posted on its official website that Nakamura was retiring from women's professional shogi for personal reasons, and that her retirement would become official upon completion of her last official game for the 2024–2025 shogi season. Nakamura's retirement became official on July 8, 2024, after her loss to Haruka Aikawa in a 4th Hakurei Group D game.

=== Promotion history ===
Nakamura's promotion history is as follows:

- Women's Professional Apprentice League: 1997
- 2-kyū: October 1, 2007
- 1-kyū: March 30, 2009
- 1-dan: March 14, 2013
- 2-dan: August 2, 2021
- Retired: July 8, 2024

Note: All ranks are women's professional ranks.

== Personal life ==
Nakamura's brother Ryōsuke Nakamura is also a professional shogi player. The two are the second brother and sister pair in professional shogi history to become professionals.
