= Kōichi Kinoshita =

Japanese shogi player (born 1967)

- Native name: 木下浩一
- Born: August 29, 1967 (age 59)
- Hometown: Nagano Prefecture, Japan

Career
- Achieved professional status: April 1, 1988 (aged 20)
- Badge number: 187
- Rank: 7-dan
- Retired: April 23, 2025 (aged 57)
- Teacher: Shigeyuki Matsuda (9-dan)
- Career record: 369–530 (.410)

Websites
- JSA profile page

Kōichi Kinoshita (木下 浩一, Kinoshita Kōichi; August 29, 1967) is a Japanese retired professional shogi player who achieved the rank of rank 7-dan.

== Early life, amateur shogi and apprenticeship ==
Kinoshita was born in Nagano Prefecture on August 29, 1967. As a junior high school student, he won the 3rd All-Japan Junior High School Student Invitational Shogi Tournament in 1982, and later that same year entered the Japan Shogi Association's apprentice school at the rank of 6-kyū under the guidance of shogi professional Shigeyuki Matsuda. He was promoted to apprentice professional 1-dan in 1984, and obtained full professional status and the rank of 4-dan in 1988.

== Shogi professional ==
In March 2009, Kinoshita declared his intention to the Japan Shogi Association to become a Free Class player as of April 2009.

On April 1, 2025, the JSA announced Kinoshita had met the conditions for mandatory retirement for "Free Class" players and his retirement would become official upon completion of his final scheduled game of the 2025–2026 shogi season. Kinoshita's retirement became official upon losing to Hiroshi Okazaki on April 23, 2025, in a 38th Ryūō Group 6 game. He finished his career with a record of 369 wins and 530 losses for a winning percentage of 0.410.

=== Promotion history ===
The promotion history for Kinoshita is as follows:

- 6-kyū: 1982
- 1-dan: 1984
- 4-dan: April 1, 1988
- 5-dan: June 8, 1993
- 6-dan: February 19, 2001
- 7-dan: April 1, 2017
- Retired: April 23, 2025

=== Awards and honors ===
Kinoshita received the Japan Shogi Association's "25 Years Service Award" in 2012 for being an active professional for 25 years.
