= Shino Miyasō =

Japanese shogi player

- Native name: 宮宗紫野
- Maiden name: Kumakura (熊倉)
- Born: April 23, 1988 (age 38)
- Hometown: Koga, Ibaraki

Career
- Achieved professional status: April 1, 2007 (aged 18)
- Badge number: W-37
- Rank: Women's 2-dan
- Teacher: Michio Takahashi (9-dan)

Websites
- JSA profile page

Shino Miyasō (宮宗 紫野 Miyasō Shino, née Shino Kumakura 熊倉 紫野, born April 23, 1988) is a Japanese women's professional shogi player ranked 2-dan.

== Early life, amateur shogi and apprenticeship ==
Miyasō was born on April 23, 1988, in Koga, Ibaraki. She became interested in shogi because her father and older brother both played the game. She won the 34th All Japan Women's Amateur Meijin Tournament in 2002, defeating fellow future Women's professional Kana Satomi in the semi-finals.

Miyaso entered the Women's Professional Apprentice League as a student of professional shogi player Michio Takahashi in October 2002. She was promoted to rank of women's professional 2-kyū in April 2007 after obtaining her second promotion point by winning all eleven of her games in the Fall 2006 Women's Professional Apprentice League (October 2006 – March 2007).

== Women's shogi professional ==
=== Promotion history ===
Miyasō's promotion history is as follows.

- 2-kyū: April 1, 2007
- 1-kyū: April 1, 2008
- 1-dan: April 1, 2009
- 2-dan: July 7, 2018

Note: All ranks are women's professional ranks.
