= Ichitarō Doi =

Japanese shogi player

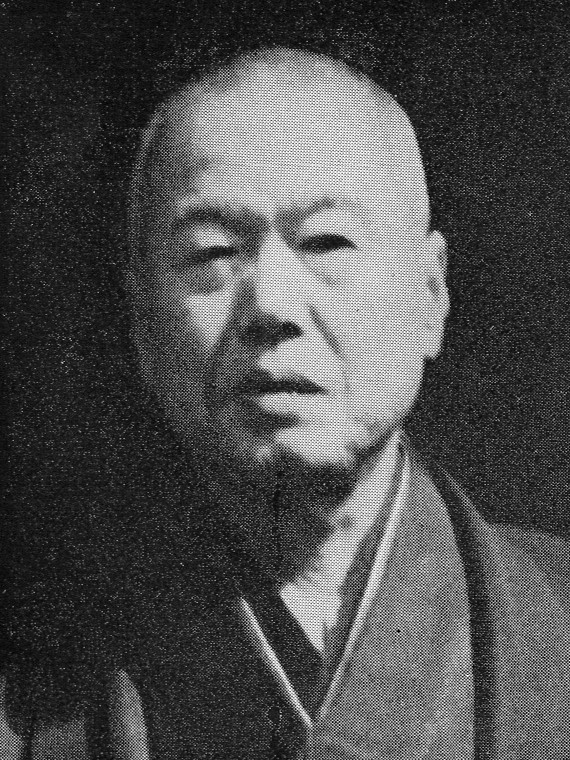
- Native name: 土居市太郎
- Born: November 20, 1887
- Hometown: Matsuyama
- Nationality: Japanese
- Died: February 28, 1973 (aged 85)

Career
- Achieved professional status: 1910 (aged approximately 23)
- Rank: 8 dan
- Retired: 1949 (aged 62)
- Teacher: Kinjirō Sekine
- Notable students: Kingorō Kaneko; Nobuyuki Ōuchi

Ichitarō Doi (土居 市太郎, doi ichitarō; November 20, 1887 – February 28, 1973) was a Japanese professional shogi player who achieved the rank of 8-dan (the highest rank at the time), and was the first president of the Japan Shogi Association.

Doi was a student of Kinjirō Sekine, the thirteenth Lifetime Meijin, along with contemporary colleagues Yoshio Kimura, Yasujirō Kon, Chōtarō Hanada, and Tōichi Watanabe.

== Shogi professional ==
Born in Matsuyama, Doi eventually moved to the Yūrakuchō district in Tokyo.

With the guidance of teacher Kinjirō Sekine, Ichitarō Doi reached the rank of 4-dan in 1910.

In 1917, Doi reached 8-dan. He along with Kinjirō Sekine, Sankichi Sakata (a potential Meijin candidate), and Kaiō Takeuchi (竹内翁) was one of the few players with an 8-dan rank at the time that Sekine became the thirteenth Meijin. Doi's record against Sakata was 1 win and 1 loss.

As a strong player, when the Mejin system shifted to a tournament competition, Doi was one of the 8 competitors in the very first tournament league in 1937, all of which were defeated by Yoshio Kimura, the first Real Strength Meijin. And, after defeating all 13 others in the second league, Doi at 54 years old was first challenger for the second year of the Meijin title in 1940 although Kimura was again victorious and retained the title.

Doi retired from professional life in 1949 at 62 years old.

In 1954, Doi was the second to receive the title Honorary Meijin (名誉名人, meiyo meijin) at 67 years old.

== Tokyo Shogi Federation president ==
In 1921, Doi lead his own group of players known as the 東京将棊同盟社 while the other two sects in Tokyo were led by Sekine (the 東京将棊倶楽部) and Kumao Ōsaki (the 東京将棊研究會). On September 8, 1924, the Tokyo shogi players formed a united professional player's guild, the Tokyo Shogi Federation (東京将棋連盟, tōkyō shōgi renmei) with Doi as president until 1927. This is the beginning of the current Japan Shogi Association. After the organization changed its name to the Japan Shogi Federation (日本将棋連盟, nihon shōgi renmei) in 1927, Doi became the president of guild again in 1932. Later, Doi stepped down as president in 1934.
