= Koichi Sato (philatelist) =

Japanese philatelist

Koichi Sato (佐藤 浩一, Sato Koichi, 1956 in Miyagi Prefecture) is a Japanese philatelist who signed the Roll of Distinguished Philatelists in 2011.

Sato was the fifth Japanese to be invited to sign the Roll. He has noted collections of Tasmania and Hyderabad which have won awards in international stamp exhibitions. His recent research has been on the production of the 4d Tasmanian Courier stamp.

Sato has been Vice President of the Philatelic Federation of Japan, and served as a Fédération Internationale de Philatélie accredited philatelic judge.
