= Koichi Sato (ski jumper) =

Japanese ski jumper

Personal information
- Nationality: Japanese
- Born: 21 September 1931; Hokkaido, Japan

Sport
- Sport: Ski jumping

Koichi Sato (佐藤 耕一, Satō Kōichi, born 21 September 1931) is a Japanese ski jumper. He competed at the 1956 Winter Olympics and the 1960 Winter Olympics.
