= Japan Shogi Association =

Professional shogi organisation in Japan

- 日本将棋連盟

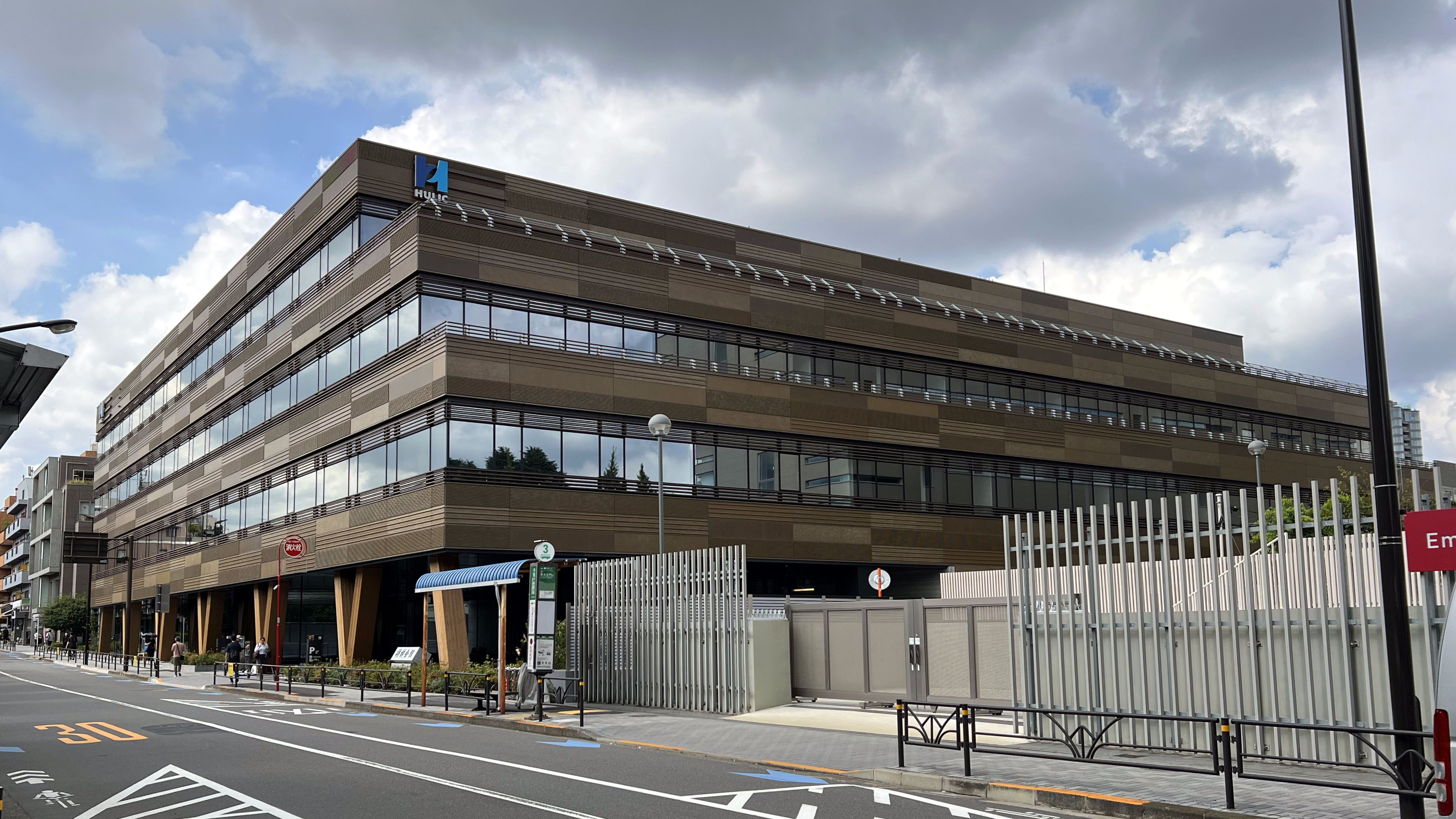
- Tokyo headquarters in September 2024
- Abbreviation: JSA (or NSR)
- Formation: September 8, 1924
- Type: Public Interest Incorporated Association
- Purpose: Promotion and development of shogi both within Japan and internationally
- Headquarters: Tokyo, Japan
- Location: 1-8-15, Sendagaya, Shibuya, Tokyo, Japan
- Coordinates: 35°40′48″N 139°42′39″E
- Official language: Japanese
- President: Ichiyo Shimizu
- Website: www.shogi.or.jp (in Japanese)
- Formerly called: Tokyo Shogi Association

The Japan Shogi Association (日本将棋連盟, Nihon Shōgi Renmei), or JSA, (Note: Although some English books and online sites still refer to the organization as the Nihon Shogi Renmei, or by the initialism NSR, because it is the romanized version of its Japanese name, the organization itself uses the name Japan Shogi Association on its official website. The name Japanese Shogi Federation is an older English translation no longer used by the JSA.) is the primary organizing body for professional shogi in Japan. The JSA sets the professional calendar, negotiates sponsorship and media promotion deals, helps organize tournaments and title matches, publishes shogi-related materials, supervises and trains apprentice professionals as well as many other activities.

== History ==
For much of its early history, shogi followed an iemoto system centered around three families (schools): the Ōhashi (main), the Ōhashi (branch) and the Itō. (Note: The Ōhashi School (main) was founded by Ōhashi Sōkei I, the 1st Hereditary Meijin, in 1612. Sōkei's second son Ōhashi Sōyo I was not next in line to succeed his father so he established the Ōhashi School (branch) during the Kan'ei Era. In 1636, Sōkei's son-in-law Itō Sōkan I, the 3rd Hereditary Meijin, established the Itō School.) The Meijin title was hereditary and could only be held by members of these three families. These three schools were supported by the Tokugawa shogunate and thus controlled the professional shogi world up until 1868 when the Meiji Restoration began. By the time Sōin Itō, the eighth and last head of the Itō school and the 11th Hereditary Meijin, had died in 1893, the influence of the families had decreased to such an extent that they had no real power at all.

In 1921, there were three groups of professional players in the Tokyo area: the 東京将棊倶楽部 led by Kinjirō Sekine (the thirteen Lifetime Meijin), the 東京将棊同盟社 led by Ichitarō Doi, and the 東京将棊研究會 led by Kumao Ōsaki. Additionally, western Japan had its own separate organizations. On September 8, 1924, the Tokyo players united together to found the Tokyo Shogi Federation (東京将棋連盟, tōkyō shōgi renmei), the earliest form of the JSA, with Doi as president and Sekine as honorary president. The Tokyo Shogi Federation changed its name to Nihon Shōgi Renmei (日本将棋連盟) in 1927 with Sekine as president. In 1932, the president changed back to Doi with Sekine again as honorary president. Yasujirō Kon replaced Doi as president in 1934. However, the shogi world was split again in 1935 when a western guild of players called Japan Shogi Reform Society (日本将棋革新協会, nihon shōgi kakushin kyōkai) with Chōtarō Hanada as its president separated from the eastern Nihon Shōgi Renmei due to a controversy over the 8-dan promotion of Tatsunosuke Kanda. In 1936, the two sections along with a western third sect (Tatsunosuke Kanda's 十一日会 group) merged to form the Shogi Consolidation Association (将棋大成会, shōgi taisei-kai) with Sekine as its president. With this merger, it became possible to hold the first Real Strength (nonhereditary) Meijin tournament. Yoshio Kimura, who became the first nonhereditary Meijin in 1937, replaced Sekine as president in 1938. In 1947, it officially changed its name back to Nihon Shōgi Renmei with Kimura still as president. In 1949, it became a legal entity (社団法人 shadan hōjin 'corporate person') for the first time.

The JSA decided in 1974 to establish a separate ranking and promotion system for women professionals in 1974 along with the Women's Pro Meijin Tournament (女流名プロ名人位戦, Joryū Puro Meijin'isen), the first major tournament solely for women professionals. Separate systems for amateurs aspiring to become women professionals were also established. The JSA established a voluntary association called the Ladies Professional Players Group (LPPG) in 1989 for women professionals in response to a successful event organized by women professionals to celebrate the 15th anniversary of the establishment of the women professional system and the overall popularity of women professionals among shogi fans, but it operated within the JSA. In 2007, some women professionals left the JSA and founded their own association, called the Ladies Professional Shogi-players' Association of Japan (LPSA).

The JSA celebrated its 81st anniversary in November 2005, which was significant because a shogi board consists of 81 squares.

In April of 2025, the JSA initiated a regulation banning players from playing in title matches for six weeks before and eight weeks after childbirth; however, this regulation was removed in December of that same year. Instead, childbirth and pregnancy became listed that year as reasons for changing the schedule of matches.

Also in 2025, the JSA elected Ichiyo Shimizu as its first woman president.

== Organization ==
=== Purpose ===
On its official website, the JSA states that its aims are "to contribute to the development of Japanese traditional culture, to help increase shogi's popularity and development as an art form, to contribute to spread an increased understanding of Japanese culture and traditions and to establish friendly exchanges with people of other countries through shogi". (Note: The original Japanese is "目的として「将棋の普及発展と技術向上を図り、我が国の文化の向上、伝承に資するとともに、将棋を通じて諸外国との交流親善を図り、もって伝統文化の向上発展に寄与すること」を謳っています。")

=== Activities ===
Both the JSA's official homepage and by-laws list the official activities of the association as follows:

- Negotiate contracts with all domestic media (newspapers, magazines, TV, etc.) organizations regarding the provision of game scores for matches or tournaments sponsored by the association. This includes providing comments and analysis as needed.
- Issue a monthly magazine as well as publish game scores as necessary.
- Organize tournaments, meetings, or seminars as needed as well as establish branch offices or shogi "classrooms" wherever and whenever deemed appropriate.
- Foster the spread and instruction of shogi domestically through the training of certified teaching professionals.
- Increase the popularity of shogi internationally by holding and sponsoring international matches and supporting international tournaments.
- Foster the development of "Shogi-dō" or "The Art of Shogi" through the establishment of shogi clubs or through the lease of facilities to the general public for seminars and training, etc.
- Dispatch shogi professionals, etc. to various locations both domestically and internationally to increase shogi's popularity and to offer guidance and instruction.
- Enter into arrangements with various cultural organizations and promote cultural activities.
- Perform any activities other than those listed above which are deemed essential to achieving the association's objectives.

=== Status ===
The JSA officially registered as a "Public Interest Incorporated Association" (公益社団法人, kōeki shadan hōjin) under Japanese law on April 1, 2011. (Note: A "Public Interest Incorporated association" is a general incorporated association that has received the authorization under Article 4: General incorporated associations and general incorporated foundations that operate the business for public interest purposes may be authorized by the administrative agency of the Act on Authorization of Public Interest Incorporated Associations and Public Interest Incorporated Foundation (Act No. 49 of 2006)) Prior to that, the JSA had been officially registered as Membership Association (社団法人, shadan hōjin) since July 29, 1949.

=== Headquarters and other offices ===
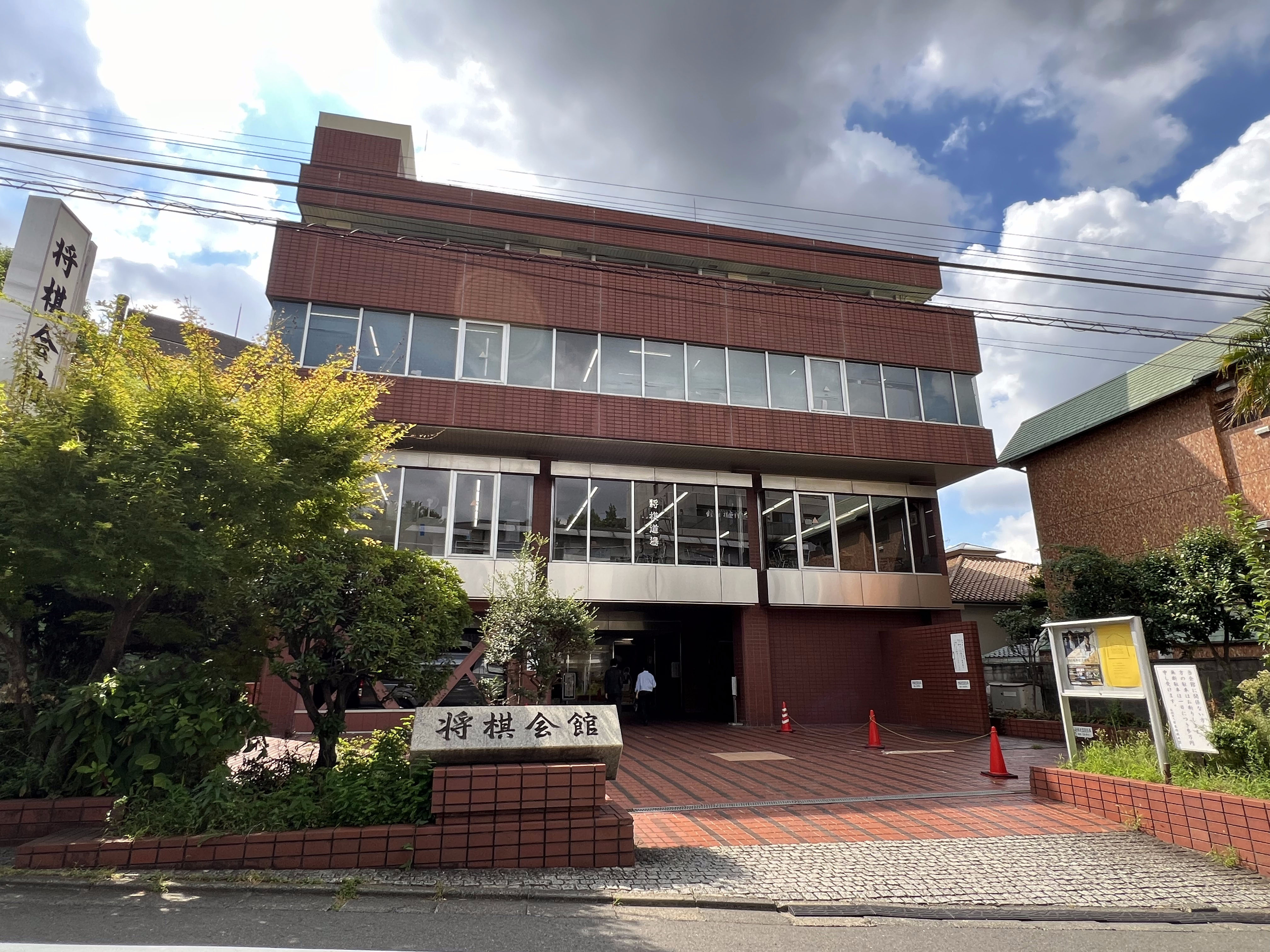
Former headquarters in September 2024

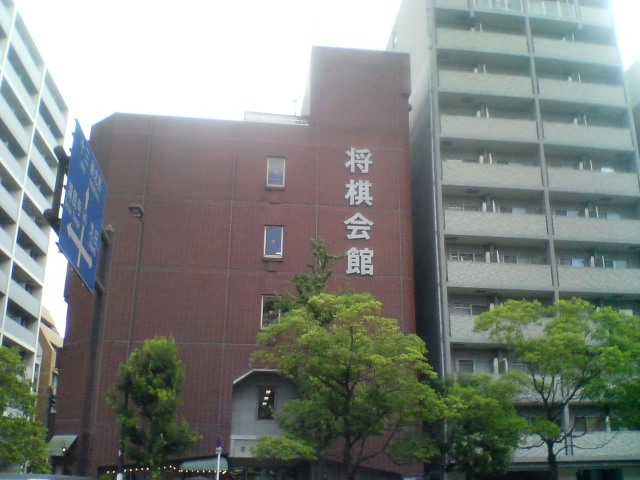
Former Kansai Shogi Kaikan in Fukushima-ku, Osaka

The headquarters (本部, honbu) of the JSA is located in the Sendagaya area of Tokyo's Shibuya Ward, while the main office for western Japan is the Kansai Shogi Kaikan located in Takatsuki, Osaka Prefecture and the main office for northern Japan is in Sapporo, Hokkaidō. In addition to the three main offices, there is also a promotion office located in the Sakae area of Naka Ward, Nagoya for the Tōkai region.

In June 2019, the JSA announced that it would be moving its headquarters from its current location to a commercial property close to Sendagaya Station. The current JSA headquarters was built in 1976, and forty years of aging needed to be addressed. A committee set up in June 2018 led by Yoshiharu Habu discussed options and presented them at the JSA's June 2019 General Meeting, where the members voted to move to a new location. JSA president Satō stated that he would continue negotiations either to purchase or lease a new location with the goal of completing the relocation sometime around the year 2024. On September 8, 2024, JSA president Habu presided over a unveiling ceremony for the media to celebrate the completion of the new headquarters as part of the JSA's celebration of its 100th anniversary. The grand opening of the new headquarters to the public was held on October 1, 2024, and included several events such as a memorial tournament.

In February 2021, the JSA announced that it would also be moving its Kansai office from Osaka to neighboring Takatsuki on property owned by the Takatsuki City government. The move is scheduled to be completed sometime in 2023. The current office will be demolished and the land sold to help offset the cost of the move. There was a proposal to rebuild at the existing location, but the cost of a temporary location was deemed prohibitive. The new office will have improved playing conditions, a TV studio and other new features. It will provide a major upgrade over the current facilities and also allow the JSA to better take advantage of the increase in shogi's popularity due to the impact of professional shogi player Sōta Fujii.

=== General meetings and the board of directors ===
Ichiyo Shimizu has been JSA president since June 6, 2025. Once a year (more often if needed), the JSA membership meets to discuss matters relevant to the association. Organizational matters, financial matters, disciplinary matters, etc. are all discussed and placed to a vote. Each regular member (Note: A "regular" member is defined by the JSA as those who are recognized as members in good standing by the board of directors. More specifically, they are as follows: (1) all shogi professionals (ranked 4 dan or higher); and (2) all JSA member women professional title holders or women professionals ranked 4-dan or higher.) is given one vote.

Every two years, the JSA's board of directors is chosen during the annual meeting. No less than eight, but no more than twenty members are selected to be directors for a period of two years. The recently elected directors then choose one of their fellow directors to serve as president, one to serve as senior managing director, and no less than four to serve as executive directors. In addition, the general membership selects no more than three individuals to serve as the association's comptrollers. Directors, their relatives, persons having special relationships with directors, and JSA employees are not allowed to be comptrollers.

The JSA maintains a business office and hires staff to help manage the everyday affairs of the association as well as assist in other tasks deemed by the president to be important.

=== Past presidents ===
The following is a list of past presidents of the JSA.

No.	Name	From	To
1	Yoshio Kimura	December 1947	March 1948
2	Tōichi Watanabe	March 1948	March 1953
3	Nobuhiko Sakaguchi	March 1953	March 1955
4	Kiyoshi Hagiwara	March 1955	March 1957
5	Jirō Katō	March 1957	May 1961
6	Yasuo Harada	May 1961	May 1967
7	Nobuhiko Sakaguchi	May 1967	May 1969
8	Yūzō Maruta	May 1969	May 1973
9	Jirō Katō	May 1973	July 1974
10	Masao Tsukada^{*}	July 1974	December 1976
11	Yasuharu Ōyama	December 1976	May 1989
12	Tatsuya Futakami	May 1989	May 2003
13	Makoto Nakahara	May 2003	May 2005
14	Kunio Yonenaga^{*}	May 2005	December 2012
15	Kōji Tanigawa	December 2012	February 2017 (Note: Tanigawa resigned as president to take responsibility for the JSA's mishandling of the 29th Ryu-oh challenger controversy. Tanigawa submitted his resignation in January 2017, but agreed to remain on as caretaker until a new president could be chosen on February 6, 2017.)
16	Yasumitsu Satō	February 2017	June 2023
17	Yoshiharu Habu	June 2023	June 2025

Note: Names marked with an asterisk (*) died while in office.

== Players ==
Members of the Japan Shogi Association are of two types: professional players (棋士 kishi) and women professional players (女流棋士 joryū kishi). As of 2017, there are no women who have qualified for the professional player group, which consists only of males as a result.

All professional players are members of the JSA. However, not all women professional players are members of the JSA. Other women professional players belong to a separate female shogi guild (日本女子プロ将棋協会 nihon joshi puro shōgi kyōkai) or are free agents.

== Other ==
=== Internet ===
The JSA maintains an online presence through its official website and Twitter account. The association also provides mobile app which provides some free content such as shogi-related news updates, but offers live tournament reports, game scores and detailed analysis, etc. for a fee. In addition, the JSA also owns and operates Shogi Club 24, an online shogi game site, and provides official support to the international shogi server 81Dojo.

The JSA has an official YouTube channel called "Shogi Association" where it provides instructional and event video clips hosted by JSA professionals and women's professionals as well as an official Twitter account for the channel.

On May 17, 2026, the JSA's official website was subjected to unauthorized external access and was taken offline by the JSA as a result.

=== Publications ===
The JSA has its own publishing division for shogi-related books, magazines, and other printed matter. Together with the Mynavi Publishing Corporation, the JSA published a weekly newspaper called Weekly Shogi (週刊将棋 (Shūkan Shōgi)) from January 1984 to March 2016, but ceased publication due to changes in the media environment. The JSA also publishes a monthly magazine called Shogi World (将棋世界 (Shōgi Sekai)). The JSA and MyNabi also operate official Twitter accounts for both publications.

=== International activities ===
The JSA maintains an international presence and promotes shogi internationally through 40 official chapters in 28 countries worldwide. These chapters are local shogi clubs or national federations which are officially recognized and supported by the JSA.

The JSA has also held an International Shogi Forum once every three years since 1999. The multi-day event includes individual and team tournaments involving representatives from overseas national shogi federations and Japan, simultaneous exhibitions by professionals and female professionals, displays of shogi equipment as well as various exchange events. The event has been held six times in Japan—Tokyo (1999, 2002, 2005), Tendō (2008), Shizuoka (2014) and Kitakyushu (2017)—and once overseas, France (2011).

At the fifth International Shogi Forum, held in France in 2011, the open tournament was named the George Hodges Memorial Tournament after George F. Hodges, whom the JSA described as Yōroppa shōgi fukyū no so (ヨーロッパ将棋普及の祖), a founding figure in the popularization of shogi in Europe.

Matches of the Ryūō title tournament have occasionally been held overseas as well in Australia, China, England, France, Germany, Singapore, South Korea, Taiwan, Thailand, and the United States.

== See also ==
- Nihon Ki-in
