= Invincible Castle =

Type of castle used in shogi

Invincible castle
☖ pieces in hand: –

9	8	7	6	5	4	3	2	1
									1
									2
									3
									4
									5
									6
歩	歩	歩	歩	歩	歩	歩	歩	歩	7
	角		銀	飛	銀				8
香	桂		金	玉	金		桂	香	9

☗ pieces in hand: –

The invincible castle (無敵囲い mutekigakoi) or strongest castle (最強囲い saikyōgakoi) is a type of castle used in shogi.

== Overview ==
Insofar as it takes only three moves to complete this castle, R-58, S-68, and S-48, it is said this castle is "the one that every beginner will reach at least once." At first glance, the king's defense looks solid. However, since the silvers block the sideways action of the rook, and the pawns in the 2nd and 8th files are floating (i.e., undefended), and the fact that it breaks the maxim of keeping the king and rook apart, it can be said to be a faulty castle both in offense and defense.

This is a low-level rank castle. As happens with an Anaguma castle, the king will not be checkmated. It is strong against attacks from the front, but very weak against side attacks.

In terms of openings it can derived to Crab Silvers, Silver Horns Central Rook, or Pinwheel openings, while in terms of castles, it can derive to Gold Mino, Kimura Mino or Right Fortress.

== Origin of the name ==
The origin of the name "Invincible Castle" is unknown.

The castle is described in an extra chapter in the Vol. 8 of the manga "81diver," where Kuru, the young sister of Shito Kirino, plays it spontaneously. After losing when playing it, Shito tells her that the "invincible" is meant just as an irony, and then helps her winning her first ever match with it by advising her to develop it into a Crab Silvers opening.

The castle also appears in a book by professional player Kenji Imaizumi as a castle that he played when he started his career as a child.

It is introduced as a "beginner's castle" in Yoshiharu Habu's 2009 book 羽生善治のみるみる強くなる将棋 序盤の指し方 入門 (Habu Yoshiharu no mirumiru tsuyoku naru shōgi joban no sashi-kata nyūmon; 2009). Habu himself and Yasumitsu Sato used to play it when they were just learning Shogi.

The castle also appears recorded under this name in the popular "Shogi Wars" app.
