= Primitive Central Rook =

Shogi opening

Primitive Central Rook
☖ pieces in hand: –

9	8	7	6	5	4	3	2	1
									1
									2
									3
									4
									5
				歩					6
歩	歩	歩	歩	銀	歩	歩	歩	歩	7
	角	金		飛		玉			8
香	桂				金	銀	桂	香	9

☗ pieces in hand: –

In shogi, Primitive Central Rook (原始中飛車 genshi nakabisha) is a Central Rook (Ranging Rook) opening in which the player attacks their opponent very aggressively and early usually giving up castling the king.

The attack point of the strategy is the opponent's 53 square if played by Black or the 57 square if played by White. The Primitive Central Rook strategy utilizes the player's rook, bishop, silver, pawn, and both knights.

The strategy is known as primitive (原始) since it has a relatively simple aim and the strategy may not succeed if the opponent can develop a good counterattack. Thus, the strategy can be found among beginner players but is absent from professional play except for some examples from professional Kouzou Masuda (升田幸三) in the 1960s.

== Development ==
Primitive Central Rook
up to move 2
☖ pieces in hand: –

9	8	7	6	5	4	3	2	1
香	桂	銀	金	王	金	銀	桂	香	1
				飛			角		2
歩	歩	歩	歩	歩	歩	歩	歩	歩	3
									4
									5
		歩							6
歩	歩		歩	歩	歩	歩	歩	歩	7
	角						飛		8
香	桂	銀	金	玉	金	銀	桂	香	9

☗ pieces in hand: –
Primitive Central Rook
up to move 4
☖ pieces in hand: –

9	8	7	6	5	4	3	2	1
香	桂	銀	金		金	銀	桂	香	1
			王	飛			角		2
歩	歩	歩	歩	歩	歩	歩	歩	歩	3
									4
									5
		歩					歩		6
歩	歩		歩	歩	歩	歩		歩	7
	角						飛		8
香	桂	銀	金	玉	金	銀	桂	香	9

☗ pieces in hand: –

Below follows the Primitive Central Rook example for White from 飯塚 (2014).

Primitive Central Rook shows an early intent to play a Central Rook position by moving the rook on the player's first move.

It is common for a Static Rook position to be played against Central Rook.

White moves their king away from its more dangerous start position. The more usual move here would be for White to open their bishop diagonal in order to prevent Black from trading pawns on the second file. However, Primitive Central Rook keeps their bishop diagonal closed initially allowing Black to make the pawn trade.

Primitive Central Rook
up to move 6
☖ pieces in hand: –

9	8	7	6	5	4	3	2	1
香	桂	銀	金			銀	桂	香	1
			王	飛		金	角		2
歩	歩	歩	歩	歩	歩	歩	歩	歩	3
									4
							歩		5
		歩							6
歩	歩		歩	歩	歩	歩		歩	7
	角						飛		8
香	桂	銀	金	玉	金	銀	桂	香	9

☗ pieces in hand: –
Primitive Central Rook
up to move 7
☖ pieces in hand: –

9	8	7	6	5	4	3	2	1
香	桂	銀	金			銀	桂	香	1
			王	飛		金	角		2
歩	歩	歩	歩	歩	歩	歩	歩	歩	3
							歩		4
									5
		歩							6
歩	歩		歩	歩	歩	歩		歩	7
	角						飛		8
香	桂	銀	金	玉	金	銀	桂	香	9

☗ pieces in hand: –

Since White didn't respond to Black's rook pawn push, Black continues advancing their rook pawn aiming for a pawn trade.

White must protect the head of their bishop with their gold from the threat of Black's advancing pawn. (To ignore this threat is a blunder.)

Primitive Central Rook
up to move 9
☖ pieces in hand: 歩

9	8	7	6	5	4	3	2	1
香	桂	銀	金			銀	桂	香	1
			王	飛		金	角		2
歩	歩	歩	歩	歩	歩	歩		歩	3
							飛		4
									5
		歩							6
歩	歩		歩	歩	歩	歩		歩	7
	角								8
香	桂	銀	金	玉	金	銀	桂	香	9

☗ pieces in hand: 歩
Primitive Central Rook
up to move 10
☖ pieces in hand: –

9	8	7	6	5	4	3	2	1
香	桂	銀	金			銀	桂	香	1
			王	飛		金	角		2
歩	歩	歩	歩	歩	歩	歩	歩	歩	3
							飛		4
									5
		歩							6
歩	歩		歩	歩	歩	歩		歩	7
	角								8
香	桂	銀	金	玉	金	銀	桂	香	9

☗ pieces in hand: 歩

After White's preparation, Black starts the pawn trade.

After the trade, White drops their pawn to push Black's rook back.

Primitive Central Rook
up to move 12
☖ pieces in hand: –

9	8	7	6	5	4	3	2	1
香	桂	銀	金			銀	桂	香	1
		王		飛		金	角		2
歩	歩	歩	歩	歩	歩	歩	歩	歩	3
									4
									5
		歩							6
歩	歩		歩	歩	歩	歩		歩	7
	角						飛		8
香	桂	銀	金	玉	金	銀	桂	香	9

☗ pieces in hand: 歩
Primitive Central Rook
up to move 15
☖ pieces in hand: –

9	8	7	6	5	4	3	2	1
香	桂	銀	金			銀	桂	香	1
	王			飛		金	角		2
歩	歩	歩	歩	歩	歩	歩	歩	歩	3
									4
									5
		歩							6
歩	歩		歩	歩	歩	歩		歩	7
	角		玉		銀		飛		8
香	桂	銀	金		金		桂	香	9

☗ pieces in hand: 歩

Black retreats their rook to its start position, and White continues moving the king to safety.

Black moves their right silver closer to the middle of the board in response to a Ranging Rook opponent and starts to castle their king leftward away from their rook.

Primitive Central Rook
up to move 17
☖ pieces in hand: –

9	8	7	6	5	4	3	2	1
香	桂		金			銀	桂	香	1
	王	銀		飛		金	角		2
歩	歩	歩	歩	歩	歩	歩	歩	歩	3
									4
									5
		歩							6
歩	歩		歩	歩	歩	歩		歩	7
	角	玉			銀		飛		8
香	桂	銀	金		金		桂	香	9

☗ pieces in hand: 歩
Primitive Central Rook
up to move 18
☖ pieces in hand: –

9	8	7	6	5	4	3	2	1
香	桂		金	飛		銀	桂	香	1
	王	銀				金	角		2
歩	歩	歩	歩	歩	歩	歩	歩	歩	3
									4
									5
		歩							6
歩	歩		歩	歩	歩	歩		歩	7
	角	玉			銀		飛		8
香	桂	銀	金		金		桂	香	9

☗ pieces in hand: 歩

White moves their right silver up forming an Incomplete Mino castle.

White also moves their rook down to rank 1. This move prevents Black from dropping a silver on 41 in the future forking the rook and the left gold as the rook is now defending the 41 square.

== See also ==
- Central Rook
- Central Rook Silver Horns
- Cheerful Central Rook
- Ranging Rook

== Bibliography ==
- 飯塚, 祐紀 2014 奇襲振り飛車戦法: その狙いと対策. マイナビ出版.
- 武者野, 勝巳 2007 将棋: 実力初段検定 (p 69). マイナビ出版.
