= Pinwheel (shogi) =

Shogi opening

Itō's Pinwheel (伊藤流風車)
☖ pieces in hand: –

9	8	7	6	5	4	3	2	1
									1
									2
									3
									4
			歩		桂				5
歩		歩		歩	歩	歩		歩	6
	歩	桂	銀		銀				7
		金		金	玉				8
香							飛	香	9

☗ pieces in hand: 角

In shogi, the Pinwheel or Windmill (風車 kazaguruma) is an uncommon opening with the rook on the bottom rank 9 enabling it to switch between a Ranging Rook and Static Rook attack. It was developed by professional player Hatasu Itō as a countermeasure against Static Rook Anaguma. While Itō utilized it extensively, it is rarely played by other professionals. It earned its name because the rook is pulled back to the bottom rank and rotated back and forth between the left and right sides depending on the situation, much like a spinning pinwheel.

For his invention of this strategy, Itō was awarded The Kōzō Masuda Award at the 53rd Annual Shogi Awards in 2026.

== Description ==
Pinwheel Basic Position 1
☖ pieces in hand: –

9	8	7	6	5	4	3	2	1
									1
									2
									3
									4
									5
歩		歩	歩	歩	歩	歩		歩	6
	歩	桂	銀		銀	桂	歩	歩	7
		金	角		玉	金			8
香				飛				香	9

☗ pieces in hand: –
Pinwheel Basic Position 2
☖ pieces in hand: –

9	8	7	6	5	4	3	2	1
									1
									2
									3
									4
									5
歩		歩	歩	歩	歩	歩		歩	6
	歩	桂	銀		銀	桂	歩	歩	7
		金	角		金	玉			8
香				飛				香	9

☗ pieces in hand: –

The Pinwheel opening often develops from a Silver Horns Central Rook position or a Right King position into one of two basic forms. In the basic setup shown in the diagram, the Rook is placed on the 5th file; however, it is not strictly categorized as Central Rook. Instead, it swings freely between the 8th and 2nd files as needed. Similarly, the king moves back and forth between 58, 49, and 38, while the right gold moves between 48 and 38 in response. The bishop also frequently moves between 57 and 68, and the lance may even advance to the 8th rank.

The strategy is oriented toward a prolonged, defensive game, and its defining feature is the ability to respond flexibly to the opponent’s attacks. The aim is to punish overaggressive attacks and counterattack afterward. Conversely, it is difficult to launch an attack proactively. According to Hatasu Itō, the spirit of the strategy is: “Don’t fight! Don’t attack! A repetition draw (Sennichite) is fine too!”

== Against Static Rook Anaguma ==
Central Rook Pinwheel
☖ pieces in hand: –

9	8	7	6	5	4	3	2	1
香	桂		金	王	金	銀	桂	香	1
	飛		銀				角		2
歩		歩	歩	歩	歩		歩	歩	3
	歩					歩			4
									5
		歩	歩						6
歩	歩			歩	歩	歩	歩	歩	7
	角		銀	飛					8
香	桂		金	玉	金	銀	桂	香	9

☗ pieces in hand: –
Central Rook Pinwheel
☖ pieces in hand: –

9	8	7	6	5	4	3	2	1
香	桂		金		金	銀	桂	香	1
	飛		銀			王			2
歩		歩	歩		歩	角	歩	歩	3
	歩			歩		歩			4
									5
		歩	歩	歩					6
歩	歩				歩	歩	歩	歩	7
	角		銀	飛	銀	玉			8
香	桂		金		金		桂	香	9

☗ pieces in hand: –

Example of development from Habu (1992).

1. P-76 P-84

2. S-68 P-34

3. P-66 S-62

4. R-58 K-42

5. K-48 K-32

6. K-38 B-33

7. P-56 P-54

8. S-48

Central Rook Pinwheel
☖ pieces in hand: –

9	8	7	6	5	4	3	2	1
香	桂		金		金	銀	桂		1
	飛		銀				王	香	2
歩		歩	歩		歩	角	歩	歩	3
	歩			歩		歩			4
									5
		歩	歩	歩	歩	歩			6
歩	歩		銀				歩	歩	7
	角			飛	銀	玉			8
香	桂		金		金		桂	香	9

☗ pieces in hand: –
Central Rook Pinwheel
☖ pieces in hand: –

9	8	7	6	5	4	3	2	1
香	桂				金		桂	王	1
	飛			金			銀	香	2
歩		歩	歩	銀		角	歩	歩	3
				歩	歩	歩			4
	歩			歩					5
		歩	歩		歩	歩			6
歩	歩	角	銀		銀	桂	歩	歩	7
				飛	金	玉			8
香	桂		金					香	9

☗ pieces in hand: –

8... K-22

9. S-66 S-53

10. P-46 L-12

11. P-36 K-11

12. S-47 S-32

13. G-48 P-85

14. B-77 G-52

15. N-37 P-44

16. P-55

Central Rook Pinwheel
☖ pieces in hand: –

9	8	7	6	5	4	3	2	1
香	桂				金		桂	王	1
	飛						銀	香	2
歩		歩	歩	銀	金	角	歩	歩	3
				歩	歩	歩			4
	歩								5
		歩	歩		歩	歩			6
歩	歩	角	銀		銀	桂	歩	歩	7
					金	玉			8
香	桂		金	飛				香	9

☗ pieces in hand: 歩
Central Rook Pinwheel
☖ pieces in hand: –

9	8	7	6	5	4	3	2	1
香	桂					金	桂	王	1
	飛						銀	香	2
歩			歩	銀	金	角	歩		3
		歩		歩	歩	歩		歩	4
	歩								5
		歩	歩		歩	歩	歩	歩	6
歩	歩	角	銀		銀	桂			7
		金			金	玉			8
香	桂			飛				香	9

☗ pieces in hand: 歩

16... Px55

17. Rx55 P*54

18. R-59 G-43

19. P-16 P-14

20. P-26 G-31

21. G-78 P-74

Central Rook Pinwheel
☖ pieces in hand: –

9	8	7	6	5	4	3	2	1
香	桂					金	桂	王	1
		飛					銀	香	2
			歩	銀	金	角	歩		3
歩		歩		歩	歩	歩		歩	4
	歩								5
歩		歩	歩		歩	歩	歩	歩	6
	歩		銀		銀	桂			7
		金	角		金	玉			8
香	桂			飛				香	9

☗ pieces in hand: 歩
Central Rook Pinwheel
☖ pieces in hand: –

9	8	7	6	5	4	3	2	1
香	桂					金	桂	王	1
		飛					銀	香	2
			歩	銀	金	角	歩		3
歩				歩	歩	歩		歩	4
	歩	歩							5
歩		歩	歩		歩	歩	歩	歩	6
	歩	金	銀		銀	桂			7
			角		金	玉			8
香	桂			飛				香	9

☗ pieces in hand: 歩

22. B-68 P-94

23. P-96 R-72

24. G-77 P-75

Central Rook Pinwheel
☖ pieces in hand: 歩

9	8	7	6	5	4	3	2	1
香	桂					金	桂	王	1
		飛					銀	香	2
			歩	銀	金	角	歩		3
歩				歩	歩	歩		歩	4
	歩								5
歩		歩	歩		歩	歩	歩	歩	6
	歩	金	銀		銀	桂			7
			角		金	玉			8
香	桂			飛				香	9

☗ pieces in hand: 歩

25. Px75 Rx75

26. P*76 R-72

=== Game example ===
Ōyama vs Ariyoshi 1991
☖ pieces in hand: 歩

9	8	7	6	5	4	3	2	1
香	桂					金	桂	王	1
		飛					銀	香	2
歩			歩	銀	金	角	歩		3
				歩	歩	歩		歩	4
	歩		歩						5
歩		歩		銀	歩	歩		歩	6
	歩	角	金		銀	桂	歩		7
					金	玉			8
香	桂			飛				香	9

☗ pieces in hand: 歩
up to move #51

A similar position occurs in a 1991 game between Yasuharu Ōyama (Black) and Michio Ariyoshi (White).

== Bibliography ==
- 羽生 [Habu], 善治 [Yoshiharu]. 1992 [2010]. 居飛車穴熊vs中飛車. 羽生の頭脳: 居飛車穴熊と左美濃 (Vol. 4, Chap. 3). 日本将棋連盟.
- 伊藤 [Itou], 果 [Hatasu]. 1994. 風車の美学: 伊藤果直伝! 毎日コミュニケーションズ. ISBN 4-89563-601-1
