= Isao Nakata =

Japanese professional shogi player

- Native name: 中田功
- Born: July 27, 1967 (age 58)
- Hometown: Chūō-ku, Fukuoka

Career
- Achieved professional status: April 30, 1986 (aged 18)
- Badge number: 176
- Rank: 8-dan
- Teacher: Yasuharu Ōyama (9-dan)
- Meijin class: Free
- Ryūō class: 6
- Notable students: Amahiko Satō; Yūsei Koga; Rei Takedomi

Websites
- JSA profile page

Isao Nakata (中田 功, Nakata Isao; born July 27, 1967) is a Japanese professional shogi player ranked 8-dan.

== Shogi professional ==
On July 2, 2025, Nakata defeated Norihiro Yagura in a 19th Asahi Cup Open game to become the 65th professional shogi player to win 600 official games.

=== Theoretical contributions ===
The Kōyan variation (コーヤン流 (Kōyan-ryū)) of Third File Rook is named after him. In particular, his development of the so-called "Isao Nakata XP" is a very popular Third File Rook quick attack countermeasure against Static Rook Anaguma.

Kōyan Example 1
☖ pieces in hand: –

| 9 | 8 | 7 | 6 | 5 | 4 | 3 | 2 | 1 |
| 香 | | | 金 | | 金 | | 桂 | 王 | 1 |
| | 飛 | | | | 角 | | 銀 | 香 | 2 |
| 歩 | | 桂 | 歩 | | 歩 | | 歩 | 歩 | 3 |
| | | 歩 | | 歩 | 銀 | 歩 | | | 4 |
| | 歩 | | 歩 | | | | | | 5 |
| | | 歩 | | 歩 | 歩 | 歩 | | | 6 |
| 歩 | 歩 | 角 | | 銀 | 金 | 桂 | 歩 | 歩 | 7 |
| | | 飛 | | | | 銀 | 玉 | | 8 |
| 香 | 桂 | | | | 金 | | | 香 | 9 |

☗ pieces in hand: –
Kōyan Example 2
☖ pieces in hand: –

| 9 | 8 | 7 | 6 | 5 | 4 | 3 | 2 | 1 |
| 香 | 桂 | | | | | 金 | 桂 | 王 | 1 |
| | 飛 | | | 金 | | | 銀 | 香 | 2 |
| 歩 | | | 歩 | | 歩 | 角 | 歩 | 歩 | 3 |
| | | 歩 | 銀 | 歩 | | 歩 | | | 4 |
| | 歩 | | | | 歩 | | | | 5 |
| | | 歩 | 歩 | 歩 | 銀 | 歩 | | 歩 | 6 |
| 歩 | 歩 | 角 | | | 金 | | 歩 | | 7 |
| | | 飛 | | | | 銀 | 玉 | | 8 |
| 香 | 桂 | | | | 金 | | 桂 | 香 | 9 |

☗ pieces in hand: –

=== Promotion history ===
Nakata's promotion history is as follows:

- 6-kyū: 1980
- 1-dan: 1983
- 4-dan : April 30, 1986
- 5-dan: March 6, 1990
- 6-dan: August 7, 1998
- 7-dan: October 11, 2005
- 8-dan: January 21, 2019

=== Awards and honors ===
Nakata received the Japan Shogi Association's "25 Years Service Award" in 2011 in recognition of being an active professional for twenty-five years. In July 2025, he received the association's "Shogi Honor Award" in recognition of winning 600 official games as a professional.

== Personal life ==
Nakata's nickname is コーヤン (Kōyan), after the on'yomi reading of his first name.
