= Left Bear-in-the-hole Central Rook =

Left Bear-in-the-hole Central Rook
☖ pieces in hand: –

| 9 | 8 | 7 | 6 | 5 | 4 | 3 | 2 | 1 |
| 香 | 桂 | | 金 | | | | | 香 | 1 |
| | 王 | 銀 | | | | | | | 2 |
| | 歩 | | 金 | 歩 | 銀 | 桂 | | 角 | 3 |
| 歩 | | 歩 | 歩 | | 歩 | 飛 | | 歩 | 4 |
| | | | | 歩 | | 歩 | 歩 | | 5 |
| | | 歩 | | 飛 | | | | 歩 | 6 |
| 歩 | 歩 | | 歩 | 銀 | 歩 | 歩 | 歩 | | 7 |
| 香 | 銀 | 金 | 角 | | | | | | 8 |
| 玉 | 桂 | 金 | | | | | 桂 | 香 | 9 |

☗ pieces in hand: –
vs an Ishida (Third File Rook) opponent with a High Mino castle.

Left Bear-in-the-hole Central Rook (中飛車左穴熊 nakabisha hidari anaguma) is Central Rook opening (戦法) and a derivative of the Double Ranging Rook opening used in Shogi. It is well known by its use from Kenji Imazumi, who used it extensively in amateur tournaments, and later used it successfully in his Professional Admission Test to become a professional player.

It is characterized by building a Bear-in-the-hole castle on the Central Rook player's left side, which is unusual since Ranging Rook castles (including the Bear-in-the-hole) are most commonly built on the player's right side and Bear-in-the-holes built on the left side have usually been used for Static Rook positions.

Although Left Bear-in-the-hole Central Rook was invented by amateur players, it has been used by professional players as well. Taking advantage of the fact that with the rook in the center the king can castle at either side, it can be said that this opening applies uniquely to Central Rook, and is impossible for other Ranging Rook openings. Apparently, the first person to play Left Bear-in-the-hole Central Rook was the famous amateur player Jumei Koike (1947-1992), and then it caught the attention of amateur player Hidetaka Sakurai, who was a student at Ritsumeikan University at the time, and who completed the system. University of Tokyo ("Todai") student Tomonao Kobayashi became acquainted with it, and very soon other members of the University of Tokyo shogi club began analyzing it and playing it, to the point that the opening started being called Todai-style Bear-in-the-hole. It is rarely called that nowadays after it was adopted among professional players, who added various developments.

As countermeasures have been developed, variants where an Anaguma castle isn't used and a Left King Central Rook is used have appeared, for example using a combination of an Elmo castle and Central Rook.

== See also ==
- Central Rook
- Fourth File Rook
- Double Ranging Rook

== Bibliography ==
- 藤森, 哲也. 2016. 藤森流中飛車左穴熊破り.
- 杉本, 昌隆. 2014. 対振り革命: 中飛車左穴熊. マイナビ出版.
