= Arimori =

Arimori (written: 有森) is a Japanese surname. Notable people with the surname include:

- Kōzō Arimori (有森 浩三, born 1963), Japanese shogi player
- Narimi Arimori (有森 也実, born 1967), Japanese actress
- Yuko Arimori (有森 裕子, born 1966), Japanese marathon runner
