= Kōzō Arimori =

Japanese shogi player (born 1963)

- Native name: 有森浩三
- Born: February 13, 1963 (age 63)
- Hometown: Okayama, Japan

Career
- Achieved professional status: March 9, 1983 (aged 20)
- Badge number: 158
- Rank: 8-dan
- Retired: May 15, 2025 (aged 62)
- Teacher: Michio Ariyoshi (9-dan)
- Career record: 544–539 (.502)

Websites
- JSA profile page

Kōzō Arimori (有森 浩三, Arimori Kōzō; February 13, 1963) is a Japanese retired professional shogi player who achieved the rank of 8-dan.

== Early life, amateur shogi and apprenticeship ==
Arimori was born in Okayama, Okayama Prefecture on February 13, 1963. As a junior high school student he won the 2nd Junior High School Student Meijin Tournament in 1977, and that same year was accepted into the Japan Shogi Association's apprentice school at the rank of apprentice professional 5-kyū under the tutelage of shogi professional Michio Ariyoshi. Arimori obtained the rank of apprentice professional 1-dan in 1979 and was awarded full professional status and the rank of 4-dan in March 1983.

== Shogi professional ==
In March 2007, Arimori declared his intention to the Japan Shogi Association to become a Free Class player as of April 2007.

On April 1, 2025, the JSA announced Arimori had met the conditions for mandatory retirement for "Free Class" players and his retirement would become official upon completion of his final scheduled game of the 2025–2026 shogi season. Arimori's retirement became official upon losing to Yūya Saitō on May 15, 2025, in a 38th Ryūō Group 6 game. He finished his career with a record of 544 wins and 539 losses for a winning percentage of 0.502.

=== Promotion history ===
The promotion history for Arimori is as follows:

- 5-kyū: 1977
- 1-dan: 1979
- 4-dan: March 9, 1983
- 5-dan: August 26, 1986
- 6-dan: July 13, 1991
- 7-dan: September 7, 2000
- 8-dan: April 1, 2022
- Retirement: May 15, 2025

=== Awards and honors ===
Arimori received the JSA's "25 Years Service Award" in 2011 in recognition of being an active professional for twenty-five years.
