= Yūsei Koga =

Japanese shogi player

- Native name: 古賀悠聖
- Born: January 1, 2001 (age 24)
- Hometown: Fukuoka, Japan

Career
- Achieved professional status: October 1, 2020 (aged 19)
- Badge Number: 326
- Rank: 6-dan
- Teacher: Isao Nakata (8-dan)
- Meijin class: B2
- Ryūō class: 6

Websites
- JSA profile page

Yūsei Koga (古賀 悠聖, Koga Yūsei; January 1, 2001) is a Japanese professional shogi player ranked 6-dan.

== Early life and apprentice professional ==
Koga was born in Fukuoka, Japan on February 13, 1996. He learned how to play shogi from his grandfather when he was about four years old.

Koga entered the Japan Shogi Association's apprentice school in September 2011 as a protegee of shogi professional Isao Nakata. He was promoted to the rank of apprentice professional 3-dan in April 2017 and obtained full professional status and the rank of 4-dan after finishing third in the 67th 3-dan League (April 2020 – September 2020) with a record of 13 wins and 5 losses. Although Koga's third place finish was not sufficient to earn him direct promotion to 4-dan, it was good enough to earn him a second promotion point which gave him the option to enter the professional ranks as a free class player. After consulting with his mentor Nakata, Koga decided he wanted to turn professional even if it meant starting in the Free Class. (Note: Koga earned his first promotion point in third place with a record of 13 wins and 5 losses in the 65th 3-dan League (April 2019 – September 2019).)

== Shogi professional ==
In September 2021, Koga was promoted to Meijin Class C2 after defeating Hirotaka Kajiura 7-dan to reach the finals of the 52nd Shinjin-Ō tournament. Koga's victory meant that he satisfied the criteria for promotion to Class C2 for the 80th Meijin League (April 2022 – March 2023).

=== Promotion history ===
The promotion history for Koga is as follows.

- 6-kyū: September 2011
- 3-dan: April 2017
- 4-dan: October 1, 2020
- 5-dan: March 14, 2023
- 6-dan: March 5, 2024

== Tsume Shogi Solving Competition ==
In March 2024, Koga won the 21st Tsume Shogi Solving Competition. He finished with a score of 73 points out of a possible 100 to win the competition for the first time. The tournament had been last held in 2019, but was cancelled from 2020 to 2023 due to the COVID-19 pandemic. Sōta Fujii 8-crown title holder, who won the competition the last five times it was held, did not participate in the competition.
