= 81diver =

Japanese manga series

- First tankōbon volume cover, featuring Soyo Nakashizu

ハチワンダイバー (Hachi Wan Daibā)
- Manga
- Written by: Yokusaru Shibata
- Published by: Shueisha
- English publisher: Shueisha (digital)
- Imprint: Young Jump Comics
- Magazine: Weekly Young Jump
- Original run: September 7, 2006 – July 17, 2014
- Volumes: 35
- Television drama
- Directed by: Naruhide Mizuta; Hiroaki Matsuyama
- Produced by: Yasuyuki Azuma
- Written by: Kazunao Furuya
- Music by: Hiroyuki Sawano
- Original network: Fuji TV
- Original run: May 3, 2008 – July 19, 2008
- Episodes: 11
- icon

81diver (Japanese: ハチワンダイバー, Hepburn: Hachi Wan Daibā) is a Japanese shogi-themed manga series written and illustrated by Yokusaru Shibata. It was serialized in Shueisha's seinen manga magazine Weekly Young Jump from September 2006 to July 2014, with its chapters collected in 35 tankōbon volumes. The story follows Kentarō Sugata, a shogi player who, after failing to go pro, is inspired to take the game seriously again following a defeat by Soyo Nakashizu, a champion with a surprising side job.

An 11-episode television drama adaptation was broadcast on Fuji TV from May to July 2008. It starred Junpei Mizobata as Kentarō Sugata and Riisa Naka as Soyo Nakashizu. The title refers to the main character's shogi nickname, which comes from the words of his former teacher who once told him to dive into the 9 by 9 (81) squares of the shogi board.

== Plot ==
Kentarō Sugata failed at entering the professional league of shogi board game competition. However, he continues to play the game for a living by gambling at amateur shogi clubs. His encounter and defeat by the shogi player named Soyo Nakashizu, known as "Akihabara's champion" (アキバの受け師, Akiba no Ukeshi), shocks him and, combined with his financial crisis, reinvigorates him to take shogi more seriously. He also finds out by chance that Soyo offers a part-time maid cosplay house cleaning service, another side of her which further intrigues him.

== Characters ==
Kentarō Sugata (菅田 健太郎, Sugata Kentarō)
Portrayed by: Junpei Mizobata
Kentarō devoted himself to shogi for 20 years, but gave up on becoming a professional player after failing to get promoted to 4th dan. He devotes himself to becoming a professional after getting defeated by Akihabara's champion. After entering the Shogi Coliseum, he becomes a member of the Monji Corps, led by Mojiyama alongside Soyo, Sumino, and Mikado.
Soyo Nakashizu (中静そよ, Nakashizu Soyo)
Portrayed by: Riisa Naka
Soyo is a 19-year-old female shogi player, known as "Akihabara's champion". She works part-time as a maid at the Akihabara Maid Cleaning Club. Having the strongest shogi skills out of all the characters, she had a 36221 winning streak until being beaten by Tanio. Her family runs a shogi dojo, and she was trained from an early age by her father and brother, who failed to become professional shogi players.
Nikogami (二こ神)
Portrayed by: Ren Osugi
A homeless shogi player in his late 70's. His real name is Shintarō Jinno (神野神太郎, Jinno Shintarō); because his name has two characters for god (神), he is nicknamed Nikogami. Nikogami's goals are to catch river fish and to continue playing shogi. He is an old acquaintance of Soyo, and was chosen by her as the first player to make Sugata stronger.
Jirō Monjiyama (文字山 ジロー, Monjiyama Jirō)
Portrayed by: Gekidan Hitori
A shogi player and a manga artist. He is writing a manga titled Naruzō-kun (なるぞうくん), and has also written Naruzō-kun's Introduction to Shogi (なるぞうの将棋入門) His shogi ability is unstable, but he was chosen by Soyo as the second player to make Sugata stronger.
Shito Kirino (斬野 シト, Kirino Shito)
Portrayed by: Masaki Kyomoto
A shogi player and a doll maker who uses "Kirino resin" to make realistic dolls. He was chosen by Soyo as the third player to make Sugata stronger. He is gay and passionate about Sumino.
Kuru Kirino (斬野 クル, Kirino Kuru)
Shito's younger sister. She is not very good at shogi and is currently studying.
Kuma Sumino (澄野 久摩, Sumino Kuma)
Kirino's shogi master. He prefers power shogi, using the Primitive Central Rook opening, and does not mind which the hand played with. He spends his days fighting, and can win alone against several thugs.
Chiko Chidori (千鳥 チコ, Chidori Chiko)
A legendary former female shogi player in her 40's. She began playing shogi when she was 10 and became a master at 12, inspiring Mojiyama, who was 6 at the time, to begin playing shogi. Chidori is credited with saving shogi, which was declining in popularity. Taught by Tanio, she fell in love with him, causing him to abandon her. Despite becoming the youngest female master, she suddenly retired, disappearing for 30 years. She used to work as a club hostess.

== Media ==
=== Manga ===
Written and illustrated by Yokusaru Shibata, 81diver was serialized in Shueisha's seinen manga magazine Weekly Young Jump from September 7, 2006, to July 17, 2014. Shueisha collected its chapters in 35 tankōbon volumes, released from December 19, 2006, to August 20, 2014.

Shueisha began publishing the manga in English on its Manga Million digital platform in 2026.

==== Volumes ====
No.	Japanese release date	Japanese ISBN
1	December 19, 2006	978-4-08-877185-4
2	March 19, 2007	978-4-08-877230-1
3	June 19, 2007	978-4-08-877283-7
4	September 19, 2007	978-4-08-877325-4
5	December 19, 2007	978-4-08-877363-6
6	March 19, 2008	978-4-08-877414-5
7	May 2, 2008	978-4-08-877446-6
8	August 19, 2008	978-4-08-877489-3
9	November 19, 2008	978-4-08-877542-5
10	February 19, 2009	978-4-08-877591-3
11	May 19, 2009	978-4-08-877639-2
12	August 19, 2009	978-4-08-877694-1
13	November 19, 2009	978-4-08-877751-1
14	February 19, 2010	978-4-08-877802-0
15	May 19, 2010	978-4-08-877850-1
16	September 17, 2010	978-4-08-879010-7
17	September 17, 2010	978-4-08-879024-4
18	December 17, 2010	978-4-08-879082-4
19	March 19, 2011	978-4-08-879118-0
20	June 17, 2011	978-4-08-879153-1
21	September 16, 2011	978-4-08-879203-3
22	September 16, 2011	978-4-08-879209-5
23	December 19, 2011	978-4-08-879242-2
24	March 19, 2012	978-4-08-879289-7
25	June 19, 2012	978-4-08-879352-8
26	September 19, 2012	978-4-08-879415-0
27	December 19, 2012	978-4-08-879476-1
28	March 19, 2013	978-4-08-879532-4
29	June 19, 2013	978-4-08-879699-4
30	September 19, 2013	978-4-08-879650-5
31	December 19, 2013	978-4-08-879719-9
32	March 19, 2014	978-4-08-879770-0
33	June 19, 2014	978-4-08-879855-4
34	August 20, 2014	978-4-08-879881-3
35	August 20, 2014	978-4-08-879882-0

=== Drama ===
An 11-episode television drama adaptation was broadcast on Fuji TV from May 3 to July 19, 2008.

=== Video games ===
Title	System	Release date
81diver	PlayStation 2	September 17, 2009
81diver DS	Nintendo DS	March 26, 2009
81diver Wii	Nintendo Wii (WiiWare)	March 24, 2009
81diver DS Naruzou-kun Hasami Shōgi	Nintendo DS (DSiWare)	February 24, 2010
81diver DS Story	Nintendo DS (DSiWare)	March 17, 2010

== Reception ==
81diver ranked first on Takarajimasha's Kono Manga ga Sugoi! 2008 ranking of best manga series for male readers. The manga was one of the Jury Recommended Works at the 11th Japan Media Arts Festival's Manga Division/Story Manga in 2007. It was nominated for the 12th Tezuka Osamu Cultural Prize in 2008.

== See also ==
- Air Master, another manga series by the same author
- Tojima Wants to Be a Kamen Rider, another manga series by the same author
