= Kiyozumi Kiriyama =

Japanese shogi player (born 1947)

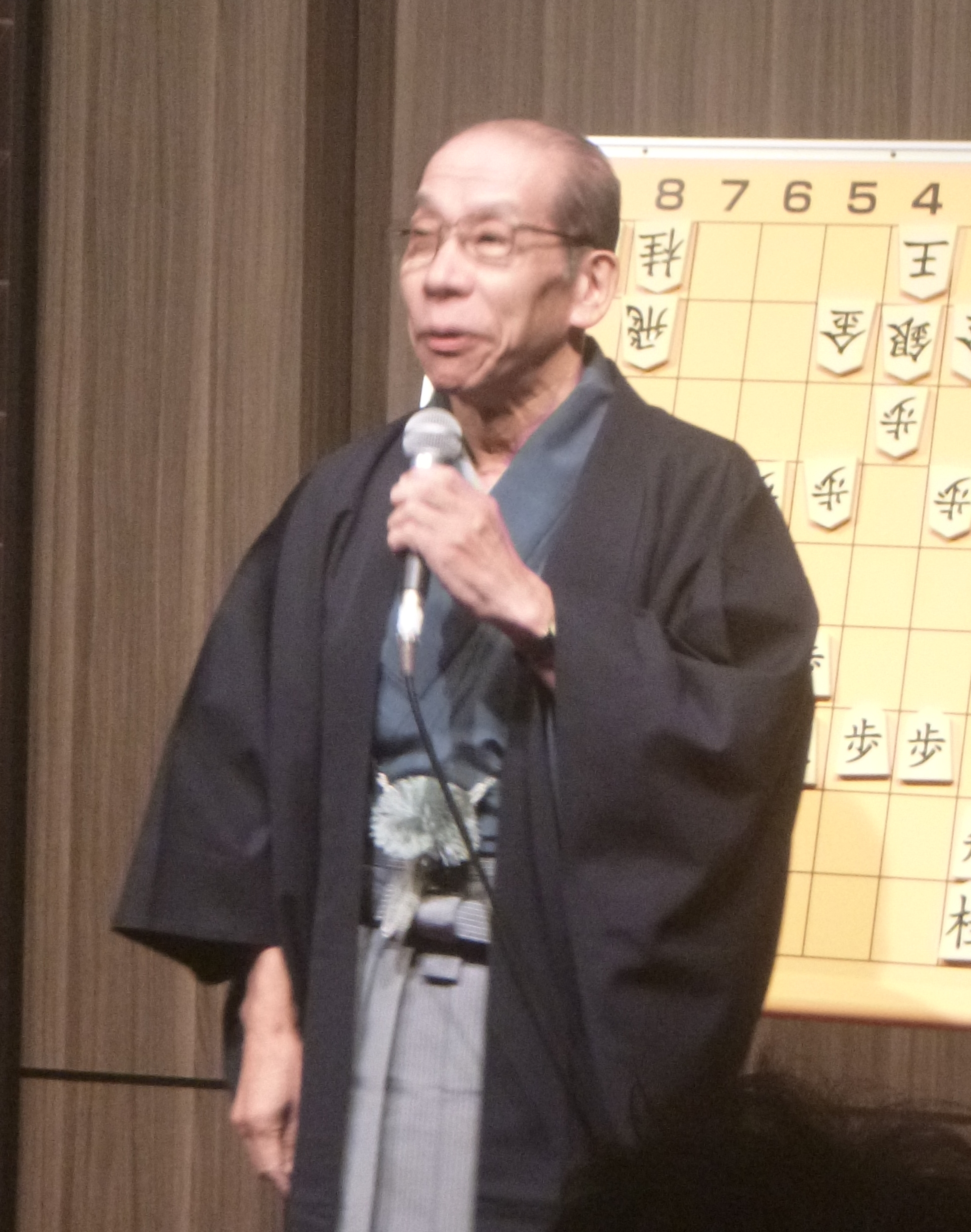
- Native name: 桐山清澄
- Born: October 7, 1947 (age 78)
- Hometown: Shimoichi, Nara

Career
- Achieved professional status: April 1, 1966 (aged 18)
- Badge Number: 93
- Rank: 9-dan
- Retired: April 27, 2022 (aged 74)
- Teacher: Toshiji Masuda (6-dan)
- Major titles won: 4
- Tournaments won: 7
- Career record: 996–958 (.510)
- Notable students: Norihiro Yagura; Masayuki Toyoshima

Websites
- JSA profile page

Kiyozumi Kiriyama (桐山 清澄, Kiriyama Kiyozumi; born October 7, 1947) is a Japanese retired professional shogi player ranked 9-dan. He is a former Kisei and Kiō major title holder as well as a former director of the Japan Shogi Association.

== Early life and apprenticeship ==
Kiriyama was born on October 17, 1947, in Shimoichi, Nara. He learned how to play shogi when he was about five years old, and as a young boy played some instructional games against Kōzō Masuda during Masuda's frequent visits to the Nara area. In 1957, at the age of nine, Kiriyama moved to Tokyo to study shogi under Masuda as an uchi-deshi (a "live-in apprentice") but became homesick and returned home after only a few months.

Kiriyama never lost his passion for shogi, however, and the following year he entered the Kansai branch of the Japan Shogi Association's apprentice school at the rank of 7-kyū under the guidance of shogi professional Toshiji Masuda. He was promoted to the rank of 1-dan in 1963 and obtained full professional status and the rank of 4-dan in April 1966.

== Shogi professional ==
=== Promotion history ===
Kiriyama's promotion history is as follows:

- 7-kyū: 1958
- 1-dan: 1963
- 4-dan: April 1, 1966
- 5-dan: April 1, 1969
- 6-dan: April 1, 1970
- 7-dan: April 1, 1973
- 8-dan: April 1, 1975
- 9-dan: October 9, 1984
- Retired: April 27, 2022

=== Titles and other championships ===
Kiriyama has appeared in major title matches a total of ten times and has won four titles. In addition to major titles, he has won seven other shogi championships during his career.

==== Major titles ====
Title	Years	Number of times overall
Kisei	1986–87 (Note: The Kisei title was held twice yearly up to 1995. Kiriyama won the title for the first time in the Spring of 1986 and then successfully defended the title in the Fall of 1986 and the Spring of 1987.)	3
Kiō	1984	1

==== Other championships ====
Tournament	Years	Number of times
^{*}Kogōshin'eisen	1968	1
Ōza (Note: The Ōza tournament was a regular shogi tournament up to 1983 when it was upgraded to major title status.)	1972	1
^{*}Hayazashi Senshuken	1976, 1983	2
^{*}All Star Kachinuki-sen	1979	1
^{*}All Nihon Pro	1982	1
^{*}Meishō-sen	1987	1

Note: Tournaments marked with an asterisk (*) are no longer held.

=== Awards and honors ===
Kiriyama has received numerous awards and honors throughout his career for his accomplishments in both on an off the shogi board. These include the Annual Shogi Awards given out by the JSA for performance in official games and other awards given out by governmental organizations, etc. for contributions made to Japanese society.

==== Annual shogi awards ====
- 2nd Annual Awards (April 1974 – March 1975): Best Winning Percentage
- 3rd Annual Awards (April 1975 – March 1976): Distinguished Service Award
- 8th Annual Awards (April 1980 – March 1981): Fighting-spirit
- 10th Annual Awards (April 1982 – March 1983): Fighting-spirit
- 11th Annual Awards (April 1983 – March 1984): Most Games Won, Technique Award
- 12th Annual Awards (April 1984 – March 1985): Distinguished Service Award

==== Other awards ====
- 1988: Shogi Honor Fighting-spirit Award (Awarded by JSA in recognition of winning 600 official games as a professional)
- 1990: 25 Years Service Award (Awarded by the JSA in recognition of being an active professional for twenty-five years)
- 2000: Shogi Honor Fighting-spirit Award (Awarded by JSA in recognition of winning 800 official games as a professional)
- 2005: 40 Years Service Award (Awarded by the JSA in recognition of being an active professional for forty years)

=== Retirement ===
Kiriyama retired on April 27, 2022, at age 74. He finished with a career record of 996 wins and 958 losses.

== JSA director ==
Kiriyama served on the Japan Shogi Association's board of directors as a director from 1976 until 1978.
