= Silver Horns Central Rook =

Silver Horns Central Rook
☖ pieces in hand: –

9	8	7	6	5	4	3	2	1
									1
									2
									3
									4
									5
歩		歩	歩		歩	歩		歩	6
	歩	角	銀		銀		歩		7
		金				金	玉		8
香	桂			飛			桂	香	9

☗ pieces in hand: –

In shogi, Silver Horns Central Rook (ツノ銀中飛車 tsuno gin nakabisha) is a type of Central Rook opening that uses the Silver Horn formation where the right and left silver are positioned at the ears of the player's rook, which is positioned on the bottom rank. Silver Horns uses a Kimura Mino (木村美濃) castle instead of the usual Mino castle.

== Formation ==
This ranging rook opening is characterized by moving the rook to the 5th file, and then placing the left silver at 67 (43, if playing White). If the opponent opts for a quick game, the game is played with the position as is, in which case it is called Incomplete Silver Horns (片ツノ銀 kata tsuno gin).

In case of a slow game, the right silver is placed at 47 (63, if playing White), the right gold at 38 (72) or 48 (62), and the king at 28 (82) or 38 (72) (this castle is called Kimura Mino). The left gold is often set at 78 (32). As can be seen in the accompanying diagrams, this leads to a symmetrical stance. The name comes from the fact that the two silvers look like horns or antlers.

Yasuharu Oyama used to favor a sequence of moves attacking with the gold and silver on the left while defending the king. In addition, a counterattack with a sleeve rook from 38 (72) is also a powerful tactic. On the other hand, it is very difficult for the static rook side to set up a quick game such as Climbing Silver, unlike the case of a static rook vs. Fourth File Rook. However, Katō-style Sleeve Rook and the Standing Gold strategy (金立ち戦法 kintachi senpō) are known to be effective against White Central Rook. In addition, Static Rook Anaguma and King's Head Vanguard Pawn are effective countermeasures for slow game strategies.

When the pawn isn't pushed along 5th. file, it is called "Hi-chan style" after the nickname of Hideo Yamaguchi, who developed the tactic. In addition, another possibility (favored by players such as Hatasu Itō) is setting up the rook at the 1st. rank, and then moving the bishop to the 5th file, with the king sometimes castled in a Central House, which would constitute a Pinwheel formation. The pinwheel can be developed from the silver horns central rook, but there are also ways to aim for the pinwheel from the beginning (namely, Static Rook First File Rook or Right King to Pinwheel).

Silver Horns variation
☖ pieces in hand: –

9	8	7	6	5	4	3	2	1
									1
									2
									3
									4
									5
歩		歩	歩		歩	歩		歩	6
	歩	桂	銀		銀	桂	歩		7
		金	角			金	玉		8
香				飛				香	9

☗ pieces in hand: –

== See also ==
- Central Rook
- Cheerful Central Rook
- Ranging Rook

== Bibliography ==
- 山田道美『現代将棋の急所』（日本将棋連盟、1990年）…出版年は復刊時のもの。
- 勝又清和『消えた戦法の謎』（毎日コミュニケーションズ、1995年）
- 藤井猛・鈴木宏彦『現代に生きる大山振り飛車』（日本将棋連盟、2006年）
- Fairbairn, John (1986). Shogi for beginners (2nd ed.). Ishi Press. ISBN 978-4-8718-720-10.
- Hosking, Tony (1996). The art of shogi. The Shogi Foundation. ISBN 978-0-95310-890-9.
