= Norihiro Yagura =

Japanese shogi player

- Native name: 矢倉規広
- Born: September 27, 1974 (age 50)
- Hometown: Osaka Prefecture

Career
- Achieved professional status: October 1, 1994 (aged 20)
- Badge Number: 212
- Rank: 7-dan
- Teacher: Kiyozumi Kiriyama (9-dan)
- Meijin class: Free
- Ryūō class: 5
- Notable students: Chihiro Sakihara

Websites
- JSA profile page

Norihiro Yagura (矢倉 規広, Yagura Norihiro; born September 27, 1974) is a Japanese professional shogi player ranked 7-dan.

== Early life and apprenticeship ==
Yagura was born on September 27, 1974, in Osaka Prefecture. He entered the Japan Shogi Association's apprentice school at the rank of 6-kyū in 1986 under the guidance of shogi professional Kiyozumi Kiriyama, was promoted to the rank of 1-dan in 1990, and obtained full professional status and the rank of 4-dan in October 1994.

== Shogi professional ==
=== Playing style and theoretical contributions ===
Although his family name is the same as one of main strategies used in Static Rook openings, Yagura's speciality is Ranging Rook openings. He prefers to avoid established opening theory known as jōseki in favor of a more "out of book" games and is known for his piece maneuvering skill or sabaki. There is a variation of Central Rook named after him (Yagura's Central Rook Yagura-ryū Nakabisha), which is not to be confused with the Central Rook variation of the Yagura opening.

=== Promotion history ===
The promotion history for Yagura is as follows.

- 6-kyū: 1986
- 1-dan: 1990
- 4-dan: October 1, 1994
- 5-dan: June 11, 1999
- 6-dan: July 28, 2005
- 7-dan: July 1, 2015
