= Michio Ariyoshi =

Japanese shogi player (1935–2022)

- Born: July 27, 1935
- Hometown: Bizen, Okayama, Japan
- Died: September 27, 2022 (aged 87)

Career
- Achieved professional status: May 15, 1955 (aged 19)
- Badge Number: 66
- Rank: 9-dan
- Retired: May 24, 2010 (aged 74)
- Teacher: Yasuharu Ōyama
- Major titles won: 1
- Tournaments won: 9
- Career record: 1088–1002 (.521)

Websites
- JSA profile page

Michio Ariyoshi (有吉 道夫, Ariyoshi Michio; July 27, 1935 – September 27, 2022) was a Japanese professional shogi player who achieved the rank of 9-dan. He authored a Tsume shogi book titled "Tsume shogi 121 sen(詰将棋121選)".

== Shogi professional ==
=== Promotion history ===
The promotion history for Ariyoshi is as follows:

- 1951: 3-kyū
- 1953: 1-dan
- 1955, May 15: 4-dan
- 1957, April 1: 5-Dan
- 1958, April 1: 6-dan
- 1960, April 1: 7-dan
- 1965, April 1: 8-dan
- 1979, April 1: 9-dan
- 2010, May 24: Retired

=== Titles and other championships ===
Ariyoshi appeared in major title matches a total of nine times and won one major title. He won the 21st Kisei title in 1972 for his only major title. In addition to his one major title, Ariyoshi won eight other shogi championships during his career.

== Death ==
Ariyoshi died on September 27, 2022, at age 87. He died while being hospitalized for aspiration pneumonia.
