= Yasuharu Ōyama =

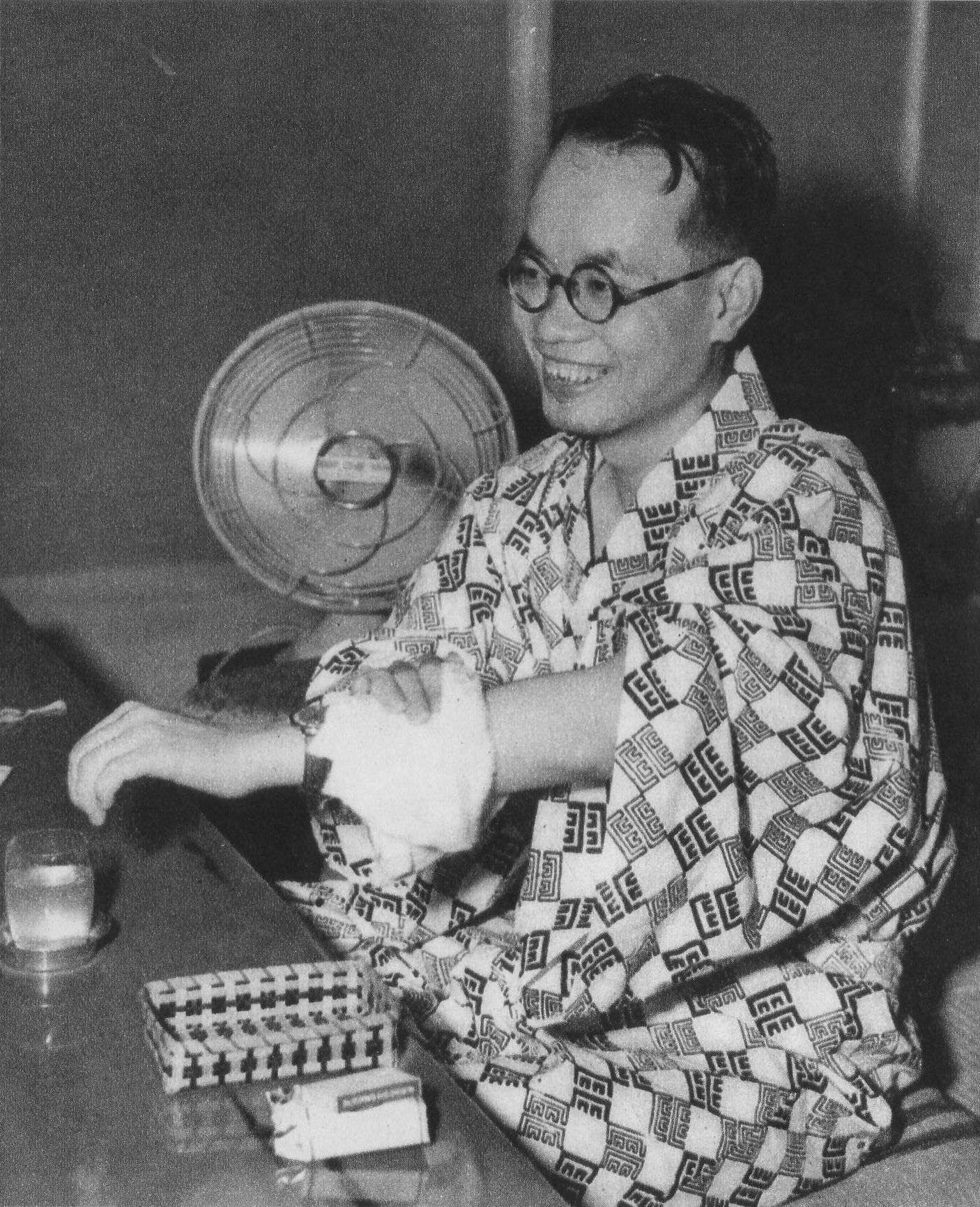
- Oyama after winning the Meijin title for the first time in 1952.
- Native name: 大山康晴
- Born: March 13, 1923
- Hometown: Kurashiki, Okayama
- Nationality: Japanese
- Died: July 26, 1992 (aged 69)

Career
- Achieved professional status: January 1, 1940 (aged 16)
- Badge Number: 26
- Rank: 9 dan
- Teacher: Kinjiro Kimi (9 dan)
- Lifetime titles: Lifetime Meijin; Lifetime Tenth Dan; Lifetime Kisei; Lifetime Oi; Lifetime Osho
- Major titles won: 80
- Tournaments won: 44
- Career record: 1433–781 (.647)
- Notable students: Michio Ariyoshi; Isao Nakata; Hisashi Namekata

Websites
- JSA profile page

Yasuharu Ōyama (大山 康晴 Ōyama Yasuharu, March 13, 1923 - July 26, 1992) was a professional shogi player, 15th Lifetime Meijin and president of Japan Shogi Association (1976 - 1989). He studied shogi under Kinjiro Kimi (木見金治郎, Kinjirō Kimi). He won 80 titles (2nd on record), 44 other type tournaments (2nd on record) and 1433 games (2nd on record) in life, and was awarded five lifetime titles: Lifetime Meijin, Lifetime Jūdan, Lifetime Ōi, Lifetime Kisei and Lifetime Ōshō. Among his 80 titles, 18 were the Meijin title (most prestigious title in shogi, along with Ryūō). He has appeared in the Meijin title match 25 times winning 18; he also holds the record for the most consecutive Meijin titles (13 in a row from 1959 to 1971), the most overall Meijin titles, and being the oldest player to challenge for the Meijin title, at age 63 in 1986.

Ōyama played as professional from 1940 until his death in 1992. His students include Michio Ariyoshi, Isao Nakata and Hisashi Namekata. He was awarded as honorary citizen of Kurashiki, Okayama, his birthplace and then Hyakkoku, Aomori (now merged to Oirase, Aomori).

Ōyama had a strong interest in other kinds of boardgames, including go, mahjong, chess, chu shogi and xiangqi. He founded the Japan Xiangqi Association in 1973 and served as its president.

== Honours ==
- Medal with Purple Ribbon (1979)
- Kikuchi Kan Prize (1987)
- Person of Cultural Merit (1990)
- Order of the Sacred Treasure, 2nd class, Gold and Silver Star (1992)
- Senior Fourth Rank (1992)

== Gallery ==
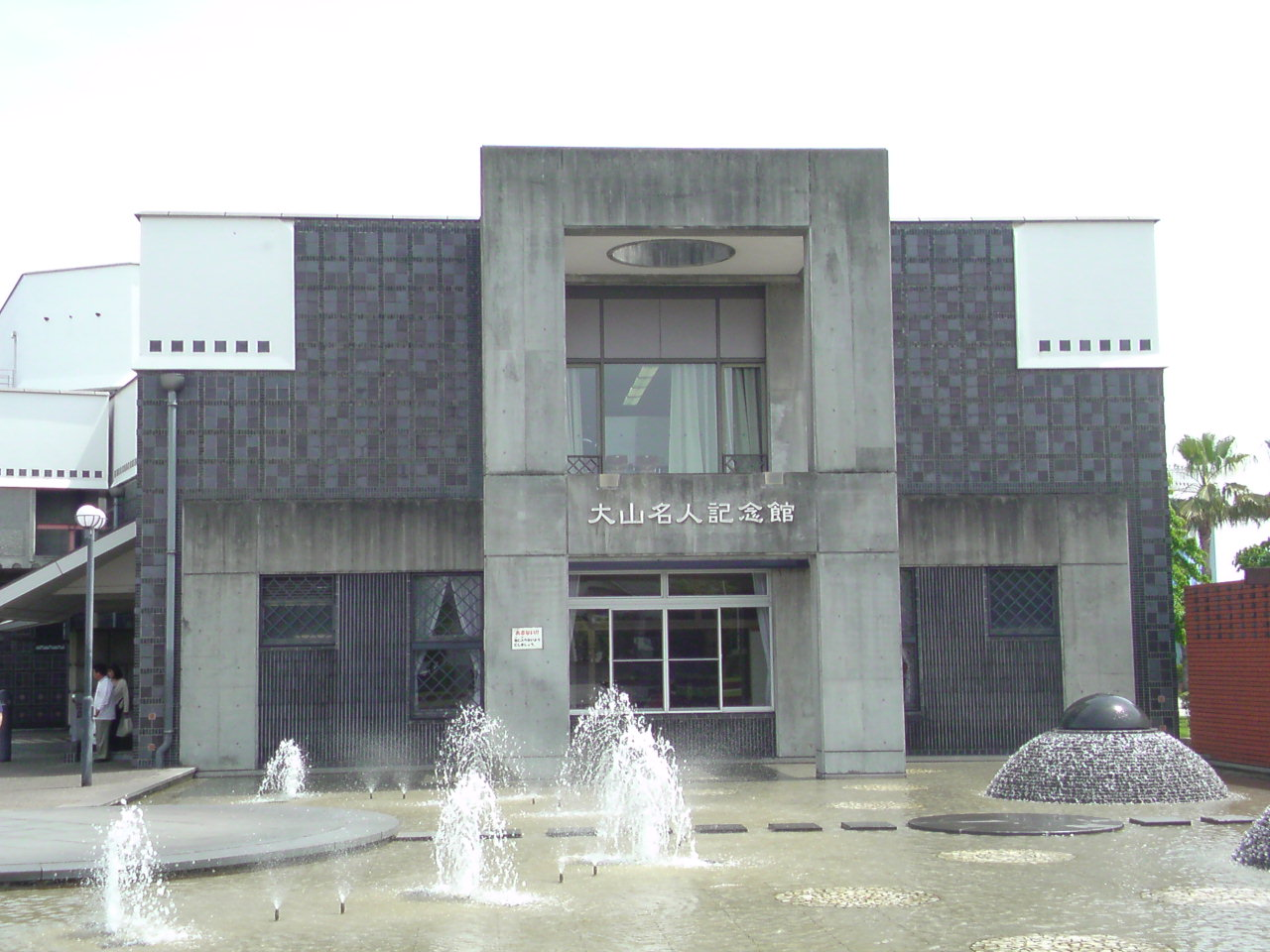
Ōyama Meijin Memorial Hall in Kurashiki

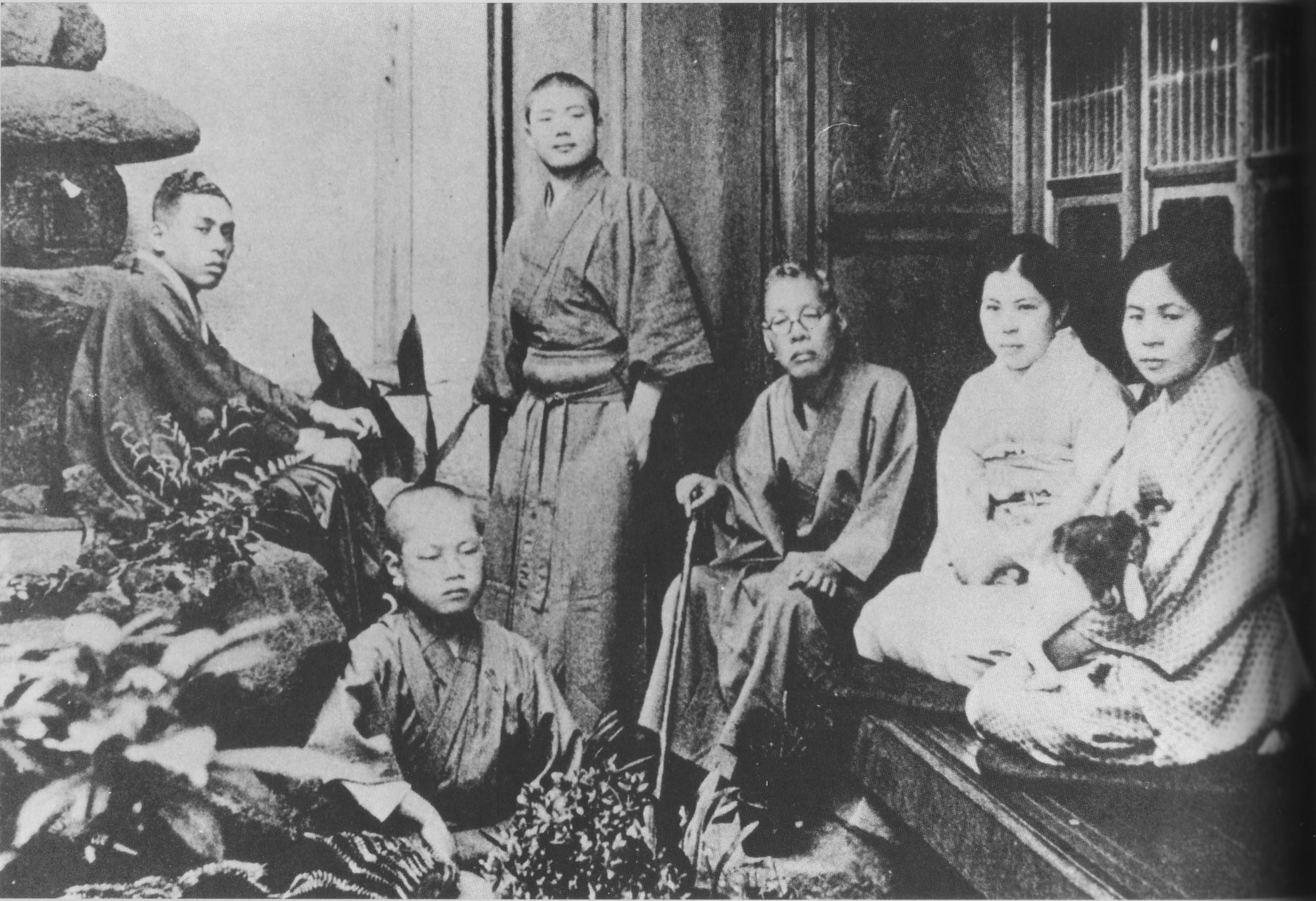
Ōyama in 1935

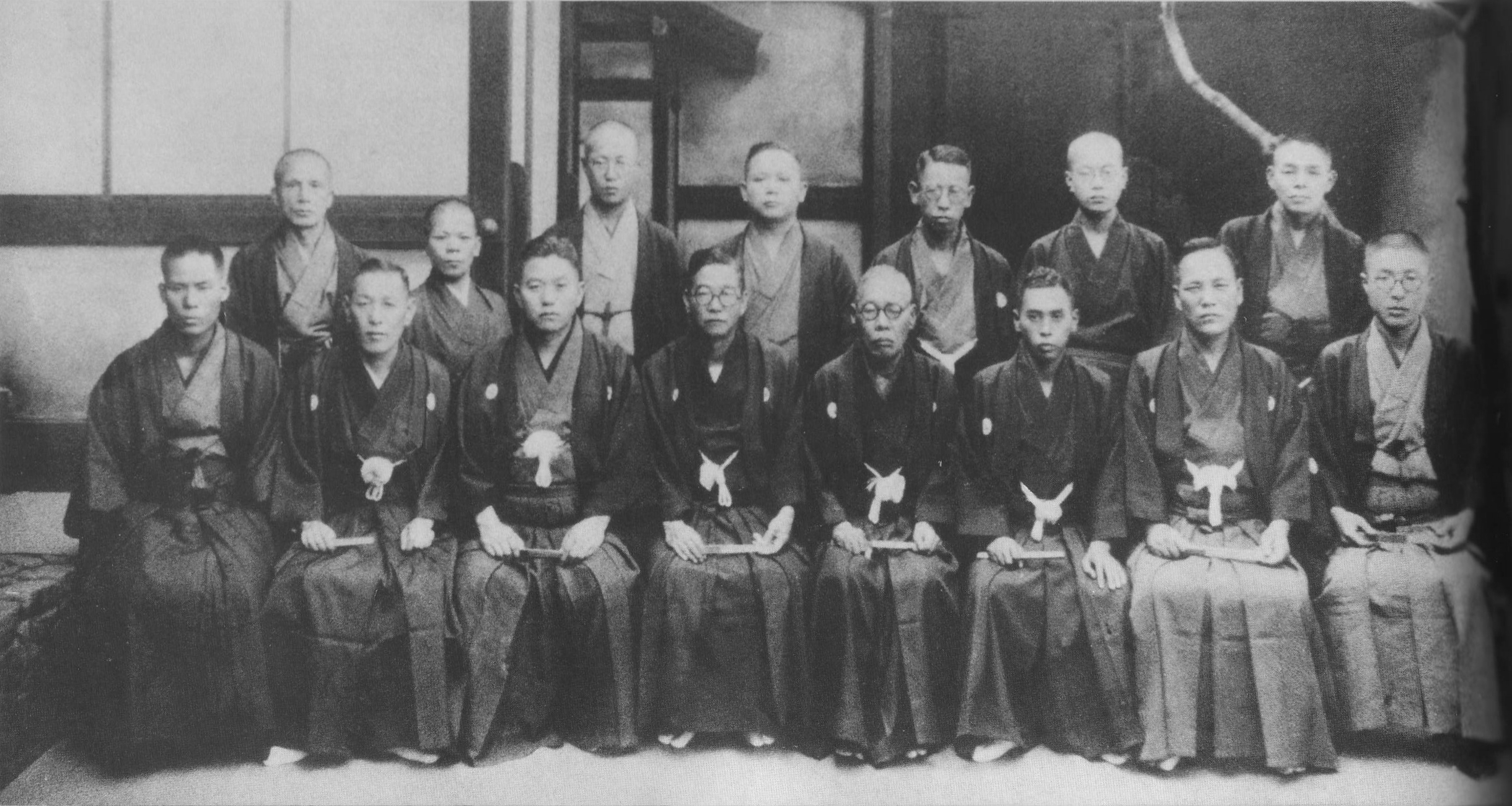
Ōyama in 1939

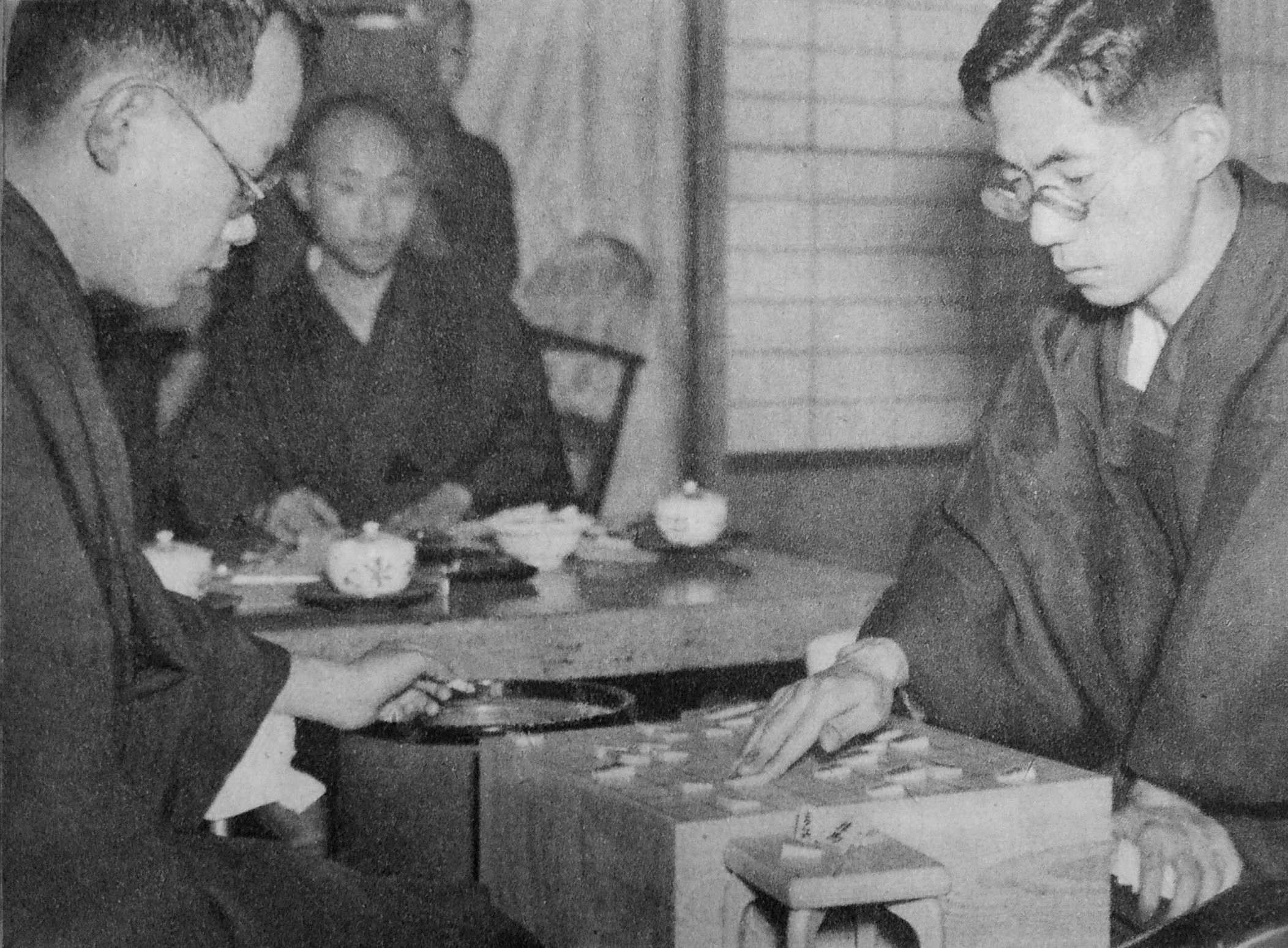
Ōyama vs Tsukada 1948

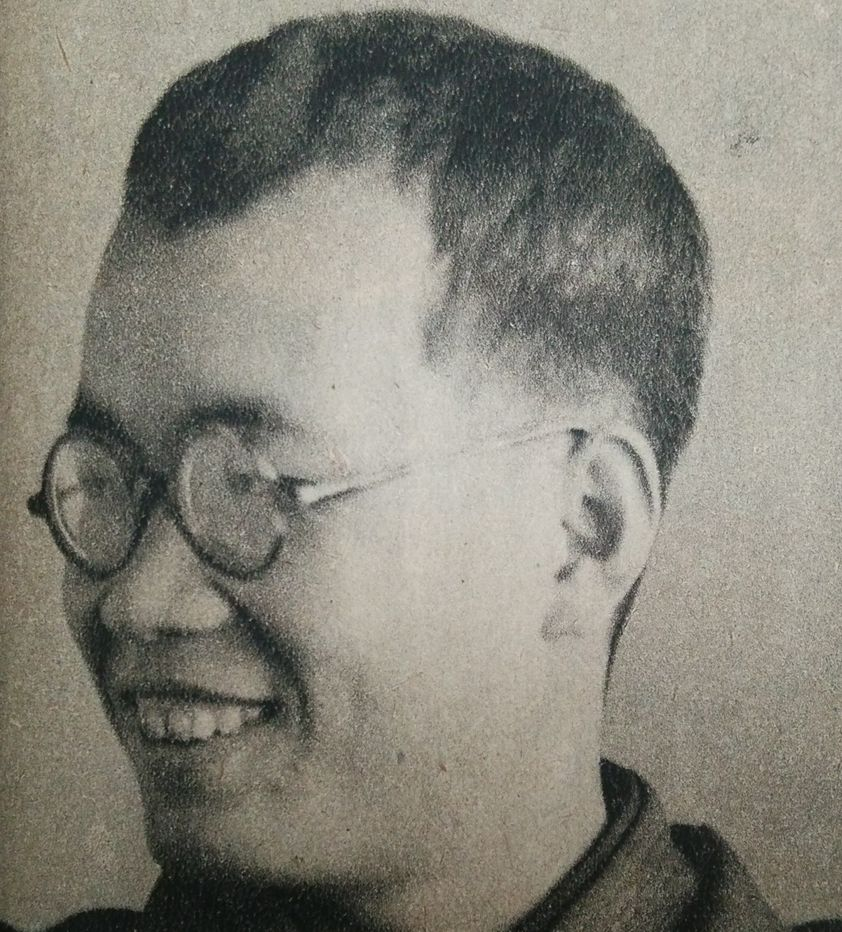
Ōyama 1948

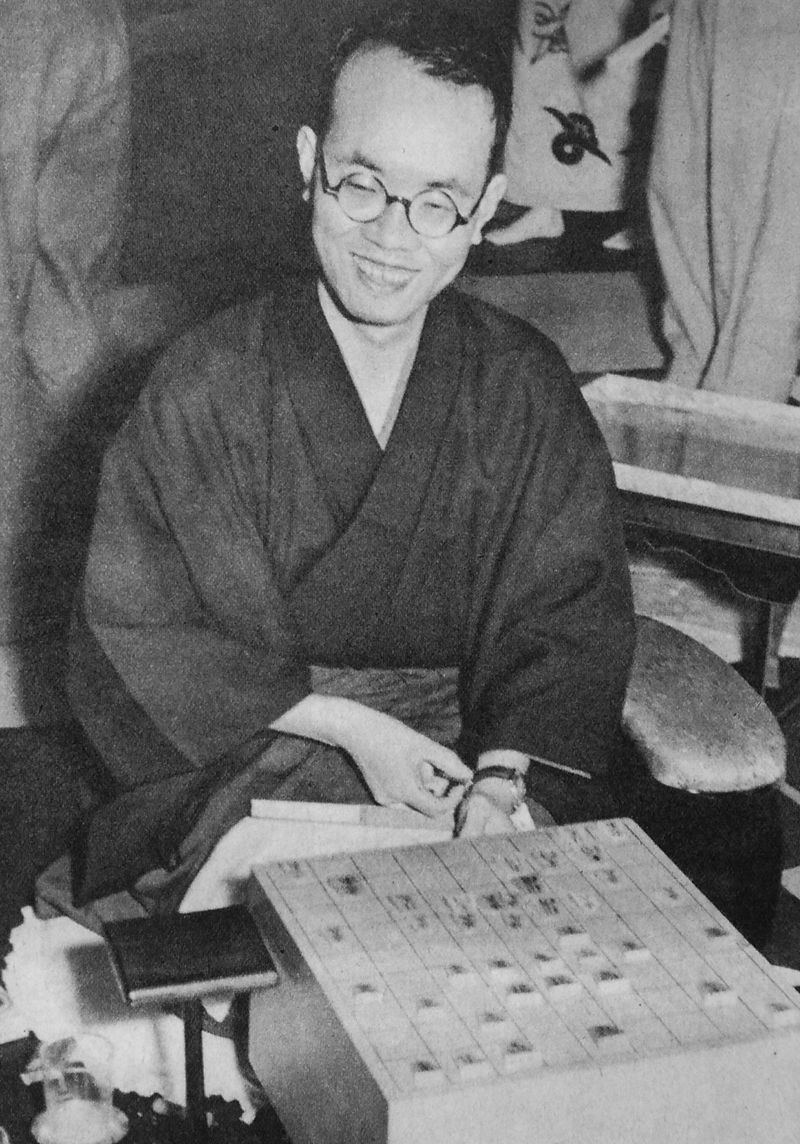
Ōyama in 1952

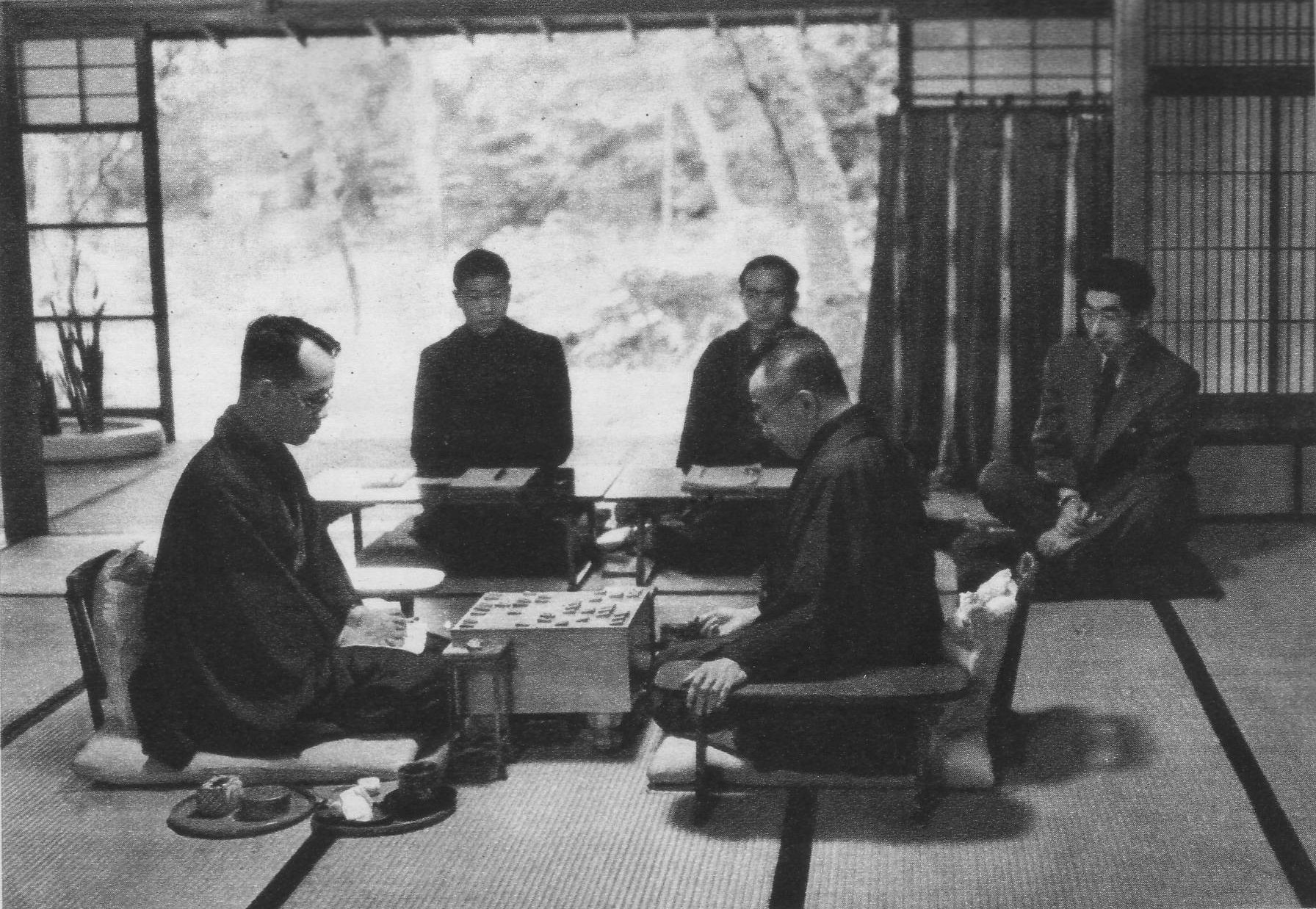
Ōyama (left) playing against Yoshio Kimura in 1952 with Prince Chichibu present

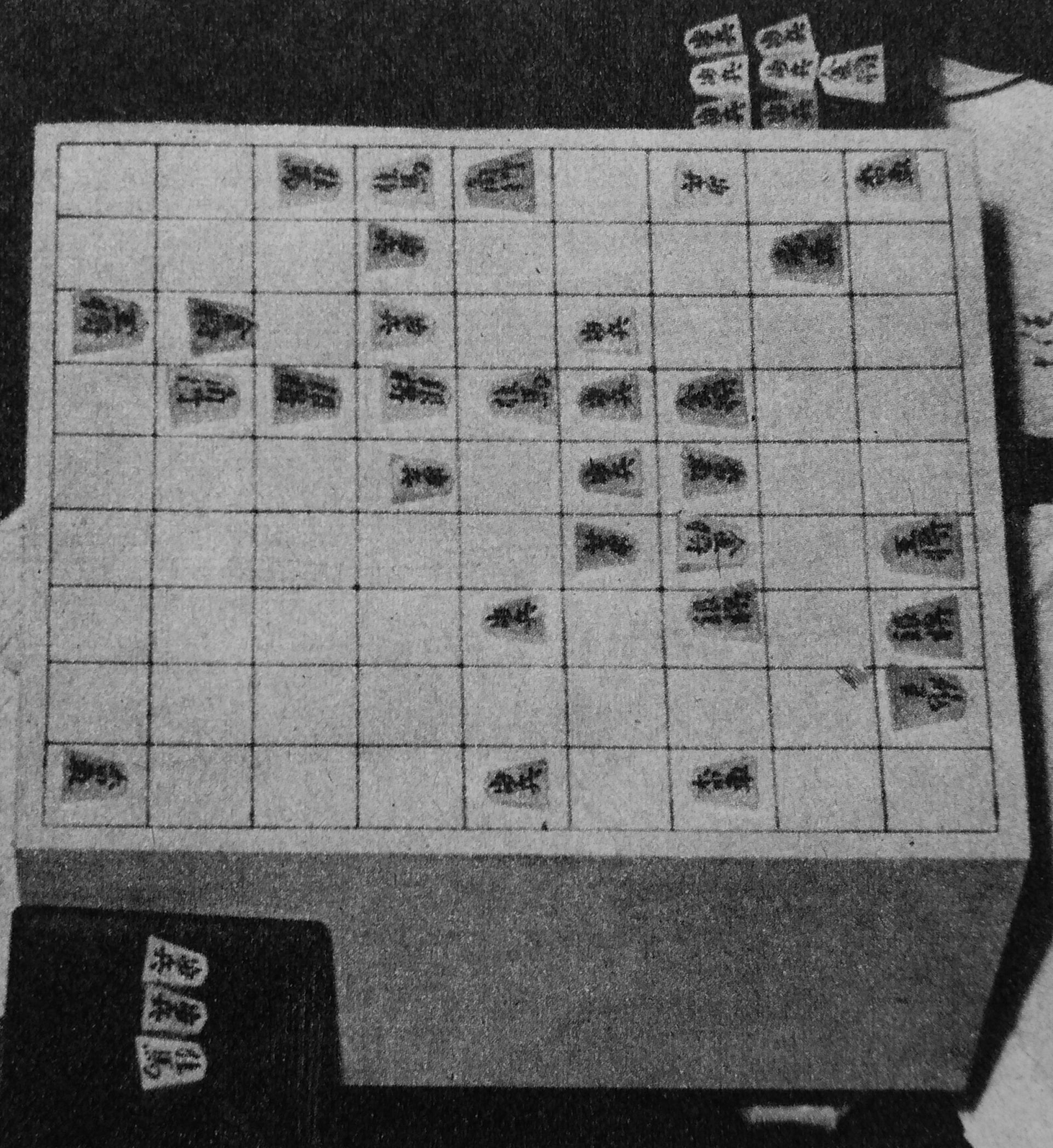
shogi position when Ōyama defeated Kimura in 1952 for the Meijin title

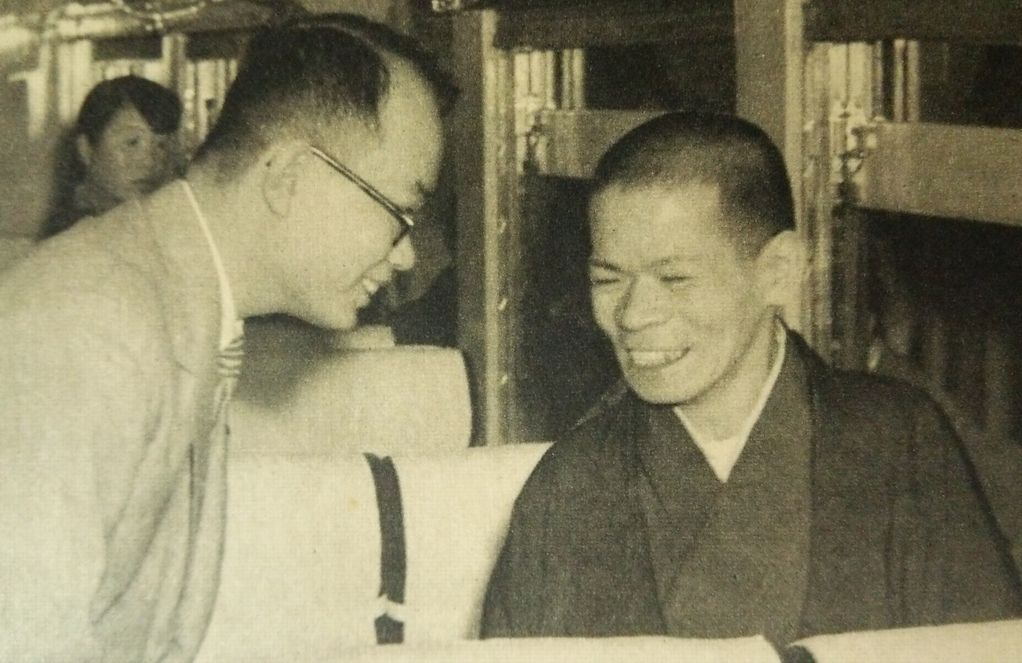
Ōyama & Takashima Kazukiyo in 1955
