= Mino castle =

Japanese board game defensive formation

Mino (Black)
☖ pieces in hand: –

9	8	7	6	5	4	3	2	1
									1
									2
									3
									4
									5
								歩	6
				歩	歩	歩	歩		7
				金		銀	玉		8
					金		桂	香	9

☗ pieces in hand: –
Mino (White)
☖ pieces in hand: –

9	8	7	6	5	4	3	2	1
香	桂		金						1
	王	銀		金					2
	歩	歩	歩	歩					3
歩									4
									5
									6
									7
									8
									9

☗ pieces in hand: –

The Mino castle (美濃囲い minō gakoi or 本美濃囲い hon minō gakoi) is a castle used in shogi. Mino castle is a very commonly used defensive formation that may be used within both Ranging Rook and Static Rook positions against both Ranging Rook and Static Rook opponents. The castle has several variants and may be the initial springboard for other further castle developments (such as the Silver Crown castle variants and the Right Fortress). Due to its popularity, several methods of attacking the Mino castle have been well studied.

== History ==
Sōkan III 1765 Castle Game
☖ pieces in hand: –

9	8	7	6	5	4	3	2	1
香	桂		金				桂		1
	王	銀		金		飛			2
	歩	歩	歩		銀	角	歩	歩	3
歩				歩	歩				4
						歩	歩	歩	5
歩		歩			歩		飛		6
	歩		歩	歩	銀	歩			7
	角	玉		金					8
香	桂	銀	金			銀	桂	香	9

☗ pieces in hand: –
Left Lance Handicap

The Mino castle was first developed for White in Lance handicap games by Sōkan Itō III, the 10th Lifetime Meijin. The adjacent diagram shows the first recorded example of a Mino castle by Sōkan III in 1765.

Ōhashi 1821
☖ pieces in hand: –

9	8	7	6	5	4	3	2	1
香	桂		金				桂	香	1
	王	銀		金			飛		2
	歩	歩	歩		銀	角	歩	歩	3
歩				歩	歩	歩			4
							歩		5
歩		歩		歩	歩	歩			6
	歩	銀	歩					歩	7
		玉		金	銀		飛		8
香	桂	角	金				桂	香	9

☗ pieces in hand: –
After 28 moves.
Ōhashi 1821
☖ pieces in hand: –

9	8	7	6	5	4	3	2	1
香	桂		金				桂	香	1
	王	銀					飛		2
	歩	歩	金		銀	角	歩	歩	3
歩			歩	歩	歩	歩			4
					歩		歩		5
歩		歩		歩		歩			6
	歩	銀	歩			桂		歩	7
		玉		金	銀		飛		8
香	桂	角	金					香	9

☗ pieces in hand: –
High Mino development after 32 moves.

A major innovation was the adaption of Mino for use in even games by Ryūgetsu Ōhashi (1795–1839), who was a student of the 9th Lifetime Meijin, Soei Ōhashi I, and the second strongest historical player of his time as evaluated by today's standards. The adjacent diagrams show Ryūgetsu's first recorded example of a Mino in an even game with a Fourth File Rook position that switches to Opposing Rook with even a development into a High Mino castle a few moves later.

== Development ==
Mino castle is a defensive position that is considered easier for beginners but still popular with professionals. (Mino is a historical province of Japan.) The king is placed in a safe position on the 28 square (or the 82 square if used for White) while the three generals work well to back each other up. A Mino castle is often used when a player chooses a Ranging Rook. However, it is also possible to build a Mino castle on the left side of the board with a Static Rook position as well.

There are many variants of Mino. A Mino castle can be used as is, but it is very common for the basic Mino castle to be developed into one of its variants, which are chosen depending on the opponent's formation. It is also possible that a Mino castle can transition into a different castle such as a Right Fortress castle.

=== Basic Ranging Rook Mino ===
Mino P16-Variant
☖ pieces in hand: –

9	8	7	6	5	4	3	2	1
									1
									2
									3
									4
									5
								歩	6
				歩	歩	歩	歩		7
				金		銀	玉		8
					金		桂	香	9

☗ pieces in hand: –

The Mino castle takes five steps to complete, not necessarily in this order:

1. Move the rook to the left side of the board. This move is almost always first in Ranging Rook Minos.
2. Move the king to where the rook started, three moves.
3. Move the right-side silver up one space, so it is now adjacent to the king.
4. Move the left-side gold diagonally up and right so that it is protected by the other gold general, which has not moved.
5. (Optional) Move the first file edge pawn one square forward. This move, known as 懐 tokoro "(king's) inside pocket," gives the king an escape route in the endgame.

K-48 K-38 K-28 3-move Path
☖ pieces in hand: –

9	8	7	6	5	4	3	2	1
									1
									2
									3
									4
									5
									6
				歩	歩	歩	歩	歩	7
							玉		8
			金		金	銀	桂	香	9

☗ pieces in hand: –
S-38; K-48 K-39 3-move Path
☖ pieces in hand: –

9	8	7	6	5	4	3	2	1
									1
									2
									3
									4
									5
									6
				歩	歩	歩	歩	歩	7
						銀			8
			金		金	玉	桂	香	9

☗ pieces in hand: –

There are two major considerations in move order with respect to moving the king. The first pattern moves the king before moving the right silver via K-48, K-38, K-28 (and thereafter, S-38). The second pattern moves the right silver up via S-38 preventing K-38, which gives a king movement path of K-48, K-39, K-28. This first pattern of moving the king to 28 in a straight path keeps open the possibility of constructing an Anaguma castle (with L-18, K-19) as well as a Mino (with S-38). The second pattern prevents an Anaguma development since the Anaguma requires S-28, but it does allow the 38-silver and the 49-gold to mutually defend each other immediately as well as giving the king a relatively safer resting spot after 3 moves on the 39 square, and also, this may be vulnerable to bishop drops on 28. Furthermore, in modern shogi against a Static Rook position, the preferred order (as in the Fujii System) is to push the edge pawn (P-16) and build the castle first (with S-38 and G69-58) before moving the king. If the Static Rook opponent chooses an Anaguma castle (which takes several moves to construct), then a Ranging Rook player has the option of using a rapid attack strategy while leaving the king on its initial square. If Static Rook chooses one of the rapid attack strategies himself, then Ranging Rook will start moving their king into the Mino castle.

==== Mino game examples ====
Yagura vs Yamasaki 2009
Third File Rook, Mino
☖ pieces in hand: –

9	8	7	6	5	4	3	2	1
香	桂		金		金	銀	桂	香	1
	飛		銀			王			2
歩		歩	歩	歩	歩	角	歩	歩	3
						歩			4
	歩								5
		歩	歩						6
歩	歩	角		歩	歩	歩	歩	歩	7
		飛	銀				玉		8
香	桂		金		金	銀	桂	香	9

☗ pieces in hand: –
After 15 moves.
Yagura vs Yamasaki 2009
Third File Rook, Mino
☖ pieces in hand: –

9	8	7	6	5	4	3	2	1
香	桂		金		金	銀	桂		1
	飛		銀				王	香	2
歩		歩	歩	歩	歩	角	歩	歩	3
						歩			4
	歩								5
		歩	歩						6
歩	歩	角		歩	歩	歩	歩	歩	7
		飛	銀			銀	玉		8
香	桂		金		金		桂	香	9

☗ pieces in hand: –
After 18 moves.
Yagura vs Yamasaki 2009
Third File Rook, Mino
☖ pieces in hand: –

9	8	7	6	5	4	3	2	1
香	桂			金		金	桂	王	1
			銀				銀	香	2
歩		歩	歩	歩	歩	角	歩	歩	3
	飛					歩			4
	歩	歩							5
		飛	歩					歩	6
歩	歩		銀	歩	歩	歩	歩		7
			角	金		銀	玉		8
香	桂				金		桂	香	9

☗ pieces in hand: –
After 29 moves.

The first adjacent diagram shows a July 2009 Asahi Cup game between Norihiro Yagura (Black) and Takayuki Yamasaki (White). Black is playing Third File Rook, Normal (closed bishop diagonal) variation while White is playing Static Rook. After moving his rook to the Third File Rook position (R-78) and making other offensive and defensive developments on the left side of the board, Black moves his king to its castle position via 5.K-48, 6.K-38, ... 8.K-28. After moving his king, Black then constructs the intermediate Incomplete Mino castle with 9.S-38. After more attacking piece development, Black completes his Mino castle with 14.G69-58 and opens an escape hatch for the king with 15.P-16.

White's castle is still being developed into an Anaguma castle – at this stage, an Incomplete Anaguma.

Murooka vs Fujii 1993
Fourth File Rook, Mino
☖ pieces in hand: –

9	8	7	6	5	4	3	2	1
香	桂	王	金			銀	桂	香	1
		銀		金	飛		角		2
	歩	歩		歩			歩	歩	3
歩			歩		歩	歩			4
									5
歩		歩		歩			歩		6
	歩		歩	銀	歩	歩		歩	7
	角	玉		金			飛		8
香	桂	銀	金				桂	香	9

☗ pieces in hand: –
After 18 moves.
Murooka vs Fujii 1993
Fourth File Rook, High Mino
☖ pieces in hand: –

9	8	7	6	5	4	3	2	1
香		王	金				桂	香	1
		銀			飛				2
		桂	金	歩	銀	角	歩	歩	3
歩	歩	歩	歩		歩	歩			4
							歩		5
歩	歩	歩	歩	歩		歩			6
	玉		金	銀	歩			歩	7
	角	銀				飛			8
香	桂		金				桂	香	9

☗ pieces in hand: –
After 33 moves.

The first adjacent diagram shows a November 1993 Ryūō game between Katsuhiko Murooka (Black) and Takeshi Fujii (White). White is playing a Fourth File Rook, Fujii System variation against Black's Static Rook. White is using a Mino castle with the left pawn edge pushed (P-94) and the sixth file pawn advanced (in preparation for a High Mino castle development). His king has moved to the 71 square where it remained for several moves. The second diagram shows further development of White's Mino castle into a High Mino castle with the left gold fully developed to the 63 square and an advanced knight on the 73 square (for attacking purposes) as well as an advanced eighth file pawn (P-84) while his king still remains on the 71 square.

Black is using a Boat castle which eventually developed into another Mino castle variant, Castle Tower Mino (see below).

=== Incomplete Mino ===
Incomplete Mino
☖ pieces in hand: –

9	8	7	6	5	4	3	2	1
									1
									2
									3
									4
									5
								歩	6
					歩	歩	歩		7
						銀	玉		8
					金		桂	香	9

☗ pieces in hand: –

Incomplete Mino or Half Mino (片美濃 kata Minō) is a Mino with the leftmost gold is missing.

This is commonly seen as a transitional state when building a regular Mino since the leftmost gold is usually the last piece to move in the formation sequence.

However, an Incomplete Mino is also built for strategies (such as Opposing Rook) that use the gold on the other side of the board (near where the rook is initially positioned). Another case is in Central Rook when the gold cannot move to the square that the rook is on (on 58 or on 52 for White).

==== Incomplete Mino game examples ====
Kubota vs Fukaura 1996
Incomplete Mino development
☖ pieces in hand: –

9	8	7	6	5	4	3	2	1
香	桂		金		金	銀	桂	香	1
	飛		銀			王	角		2
歩	歩	歩	歩	歩	歩		歩	歩	3
						歩			4
								歩	5
		歩							6
歩	歩		歩	歩	歩	歩	歩		7
	角		飛		玉				8
香	桂	銀	金		金	銀	桂	香	9

☗ pieces in hand: –
After 9 moves.
Kubota vs Fukaura 1996
Incomplete Mino development
☖ pieces in hand: –

9	8	7	6	5	4	3	2	1
香	桂		金		金	銀	桂	香	1
	飛					王	角		2
歩	歩	歩	歩	銀	歩		歩	歩	3
				歩		歩			4
								歩	5
		歩							6
歩	歩		歩	歩	歩	歩	歩		7
	角		飛				玉		8
香	桂	銀	金		金	銀	桂	香	9

☗ pieces in hand: –
After 13 moves.

The first examples show the use of an Incomplete Mino castle as stepping stone to building the regular Mino. Here Yoshiyuki Kubota (Black) is playing Fourth File Rook against Kōichi Fukaura (White) who is using a Static Rook position.

After making an early declaration of a Fourth File Rook opening, Black starts his castle development by moving his king with 3.K-48 and preparing an escape path for the king with 4.P-16. And, since White did not respond with a complementary first file pawn push, Black pushes his edge pawn once more with 5.P-15 putting pressure on White and restricting White's castle development to what will probably be an Anaguma (since a Boat or Mino castle with a rapid attack strategy is now unlikely for White).

Next, Black moves his king rightward in a straight path to its castled position on the second file with 6.K-38, 7.K-28 as shown in the second diagram.

Kubota vs Fukaura 1996
Incomplete Mino development
☖ pieces in hand: –

9	8	7	6	5	4	3	2	1
香	桂				金	銀	桂	香	1
	飛			金		王			2
歩		歩	歩	銀	歩	角	歩	歩	3
	歩			歩		歩			4
								歩	5
		歩	歩						6
歩	歩			歩	歩	歩	歩		7
	角	銀	飛			銀	玉		8
香	桂		金		金		桂	香	9

☗ pieces in hand: –
After 19 moves.
Kubota vs Fukaura 1996
Mino completed
☖ pieces in hand: –

9	8	7	6	5	4	3	2	1
香	桂				金	銀	桂	香	1
	飛			金			王		2
歩			歩	銀		角	歩	歩	3
		歩		歩	歩	歩			4
	歩							歩	5
		歩	歩	銀					6
歩	歩	角		歩	歩	歩	歩		7
			飛	金		銀	玉		8
香	桂				金		桂	香	9

☗ pieces in hand: –
After 27 moves.

After this, Black makes several developing moves on the left side of the board toward his Fourth File Rook, Normal variation position. And then, with 10.S-38 Black has constructed an Incomplete Mino castle to protect his king.

Since the Incomplete Mino castle is only a transitional castle in this game, after making more offensive developments on the left side of the board, Black finally converts his Incomplete Mino castle into a Mino castle with 14.G69-58 as shown in the fourth diagram.

White at this point has completed a Boat castle and appears to be transitioning this into an Anaguma as expected.

=== High Mino ===
High Mino
☖ pieces in hand: –

9	8	7	6	5	4	3	2	1
									1
									2
									3
									4
									5
					歩			歩	6
				歩	金	歩	歩		7
						銀	玉		8
					金		桂	香	9

☗ pieces in hand: –
High Mino Advanced Pawns
☖ pieces in hand: –

9	8	7	6	5	4	3	2	1
									1
									2
									3
									4
									5
				歩	歩	歩		歩	6
					金		歩		7
						銀	玉		8
					金		桂	香	9

☗ pieces in hand: –

High Mino Advanced Knight
☖ pieces in hand: –

9	8	7	6	5	4	3	2	1
									1
									2
									3
									4
									5
					歩	歩		歩	6
				歩	金	桂	歩		7
						銀	玉		8
					金			香	9

☗ pieces in hand: –

The High Mino (高美濃 taka Minō) castle is a natural development from Mino castle when wanting to put pressure on a Static Rook opponent's castle or when being attacked from above as in a Double Ranging Rook game. Compared to a regular Mino, it allows the player a greater potential for offense on the right side of the board and is stronger at the top although somewhat weaker from the side.

It is developed from Mino by pushing the 4th file pawn up to 46 to make way for the gold that moves from 58. This strengthens the castle against attacks from the front by reinforcing the king's temple, the 37 square, from a bishop attack or defends from a knight being positioned on 55 also attacking the king's temple. P-46 also makes way for a gold to develop to 47 (a 'high' position) for the characteristic High Mino shape.

Another variation of the High Mino form is having the 37 pawn also move up to 36 to allow space for the knight. Moving the knight to 37 is optional but common. It is also possible to advance the fifth file pawn, which is defended by the 46 gold.

=== Silver Mino ===
Silver Mino
☖ pieces in hand: –

9	8	7	6	5	4	3	2	1
									1
									2
									3
									4
									5
									6
				歩	歩	歩	歩	歩	7
				銀		銀	玉		8
					金		桂	香	9

☗ pieces in hand: –
Silver Mino 47-variant
☖ pieces in hand: –

9	8	7	6	5	4	3	2	1
									1
									2
									3
									4
									5
					歩				6
				歩	銀	歩	歩	歩	7
						銀	玉		8
					金		桂	香	9

☗ pieces in hand: –

A Silver Mino (銀美濃 gin minō) castle replaces the leftmost gold of a regular Mino castle with a silver.

When the leftmost silver is moved up from 58 to 47 as like the gold in a High Mino castle, this is also known as a Silver Mino. In this variant, the 38 is defended better, but the 58 square is now weaker.

Silver Mino P16-variant
☖ pieces in hand: –

9	8	7	6	5	4	3	2	1
									1
									2
									3
									4
									5
								歩	6
				歩	歩	歩	歩		7
				銀		銀	玉		8
					金		桂	香	9

☗ pieces in hand: –
Silver Mino P16-S47-variant
☖ pieces in hand: –

9	8	7	6	5	4	3	2	1
									1
									2
									3
									4
									5
					歩			歩	6
				歩	銀	歩	歩		7
						銀	玉		8
					金		桂	香	9

☗ pieces in hand: –

As with the regular Mino, it's also standard to make an escape hatch for the king by advancing the first file pawn.

=== Silver Crown ===
Silver Crown
☖ pieces in hand: –

9	8	7	6	5	4	3	2	1
									1
									2
									3
									4
									5
					歩	歩	歩	歩	6
					金	桂	銀		7
						金	玉		8
								香	9

☗ pieces in hand: –
Silver Crown without pawn/knight development
☖ pieces in hand: –

9	8	7	6	5	4	3	2	1
									1
									2
									3
									4
									5
					歩		歩	歩	6
					金	歩	銀		7
						金	玉		8
							桂	香	9

☗ pieces in hand: –

The Silver Crown castle (銀冠, ginkanmuri) is often a further development from High Mino.

From a High Mino structure, the pawn above the king moves to 26 allowing the silver to position itself at the head of the king (27). Then, the gold on 49 moves to 38 to take the silver's former square.

It is also typical for the knight to advance.

Silver Crown is stronger than both Mino and High Mino from above.

Silver Crown can develop the king and lance appears in the endgame when the king escapes to 17, forming a third-rank king castle.

Silver Crown advanced king and lance
☖ pieces in hand: –

9	8	7	6	5	4	3	2	1
									1
									2
									3
									4
									5
					歩	歩	歩	歩	6
					金	桂	銀	玉	7
						金		香	8
									9

☗ pieces in hand: –
Silver Crown advanced king and lance variant
☖ pieces in hand: –

9	8	7	6	5	4	3	2	1
									1
									2
									3
									4
									5
					歩	歩	歩	歩	6
						桂	銀	玉	7
					金	金		香	8
									9

☗ pieces in hand: –

This is useful against attacks from behind the king. For example, in the diagram to the left, black can move the lance to 18. If the rook promotes on 19 and checks, the king can escape to 17. Then, if the second rook promotes on 29 (aiming to take the gold on 38), moving the gold from 47 to 48 can protect the gold on 38, and prevent mate.

Example attack
☖ pieces in hand: –

9	8	7	6	5	4	3	2	1
									1
									2
									3
									4
									5
					歩	歩	歩	歩	6
					金	桂	銀		7
						金	玉		8
			飛	飛				香	9

☗ pieces in hand: –

==== Silver Crown variants ====
Left Silver Crown
☖ pieces in hand: –

9	8	7	6	5	4	3	2	1
									1
									2
									3
									4
									5
歩	歩	歩	歩						6
	銀	銀	金						7
	玉	金							8
香	桂								9

☗ pieces in hand: –
Left Silver Crown Anaguma
☖ pieces in hand: –

9	8	7	6	5	4	3	2	1
									1
									2
									3
									4
									5
歩	歩	歩							6
	銀	角	歩						7
香	金	金							8
玉	桂								9

☗ pieces in hand: –

A Silver Crown can also be built on the left side (Left Silver Crown 左銀冠 hidari ginkanmuri) for Static Rook positions.

A Left Silver Crown may also transition into a Left Silver Crown Anaguma (居飛車銀冠穴熊 ibisha ginkanmuri anaguma).

Edge King Silver Crown
☖ pieces in hand: –

9	8	7	6	5	4	3	2	1
									1
									2
									3
									4
									5
	歩	歩							6
歩	銀		歩						7
玉	角	金							8
香	桂								9

☗ pieces in hand: –

An Edge King Silver Crown (端玉銀冠 hashi gyoku ginkanmuri or hashi gyoku ginkan) has the king moved to the edge file. It is structurally similar to the Yonenaga King castle.

=== Kimura Mino ===
Kimura Mino
☖ pieces in hand: –

9	8	7	6	5	4	3	2	1
									1
									2
									3
									4
									5
					歩				6
				歩	銀	歩	歩	歩	7
						金	玉		8
							桂	香	9

☗ pieces in hand: –
Kimura Mino with advanced pawns
☖ pieces in hand: –

9	8	7	6	5	4	3	2	1
									1
									2
									3
									4
									5
				歩	歩	歩		歩	6
					銀		歩		7
						金	玉		8
							桂	香	9

☗ pieces in hand: –

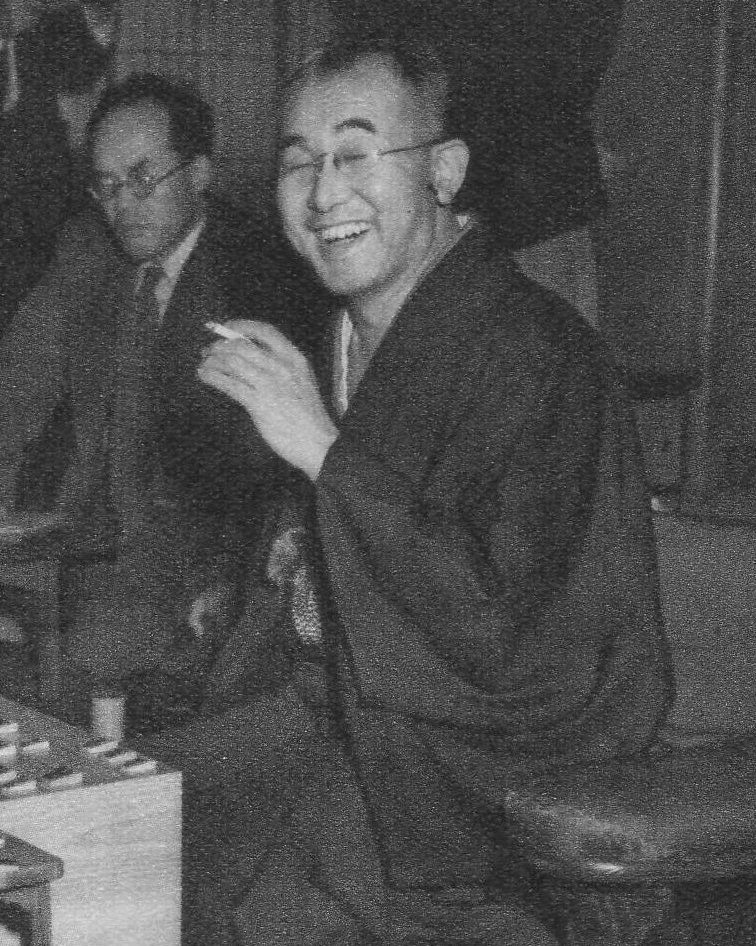
Yoshio Kimura

The Kimura Mino (木村美濃 kimura minō) castle was invented by player Yoshio Kimura.

In this variant, a gold 金 is positioned on 38 where the silver 銀 usually is and the silver is positioned where the gold usually is in a High Mino castle.

Kimura Mino with Silver Horns Central Rook
☖ pieces in hand: –

9	8	7	6	5	4	3	2	1
									1
									2
									3
									4
									5
歩		歩	歩		歩	歩		歩	6
	歩	角	銀		銀		歩		7
		金				金	玉		8
香	桂			飛			桂	香	9

☗ pieces in hand: –
Silver Horns Central Rook variant
☖ pieces in hand: –

9	8	7	6	5	4	3	2	1
									1
									2
									3
									4
									5
歩		歩	歩		歩	歩		歩	6
	歩	桂	銀		銀	桂	歩		7
		金	角			金	玉		8
香				飛				香	9

☗ pieces in hand: –

A Kimura Mino can be used with a Central Rook Silver Horns (ツノ銀中飛車 tsuno gin nakabisha) attacking formation.

=== Left Mino ===
Left Mino
☖ pieces in hand: –

9	8	7	6	5	4	3	2	1
									1
									2
									3
									4
									5
歩		歩							6
	歩	角	歩	歩					7
	玉	銀		金					8
香	桂		金						9

☗ pieces in hand: –
Left Mino with advanced pawns
☖ pieces in hand: –

9	8	7	6	5	4	3	2	1
									1
									2
									3
									4
									5
歩	歩	歩	歩						6
		角		歩					7
	玉	銀		金					8
香	桂		金						9

☗ pieces in hand: –

Left Mino or Reverse Mino (左美濃 hidari minō) can be formed in a similar way to the right-side Mino with the king on 88.

Masuda Mino
☖ pieces in hand: –

9	8	7	6	5	4	3	2	1
									1
									2
									3
									4
									5
歩		歩		歩					6
	歩		歩	銀					7
	角	銀		金					8
香	桂	玉	金						9

☗ pieces in hand: –
Masuda Mino developed
☖ pieces in hand: –

9	8	7	6	5	4	3	2	1
									1
									2
									3
									4
									5
歩		歩	歩	歩					6
	歩	角	金	銀					7
		銀							8
香	桂	玉	金						9

☗ pieces in hand: –

Masuda Mino Silver Crown
☖ pieces in hand: –

9	8	7	6	5	4	3	2	1
									1
									2
									3
									4
									5
歩	歩	歩		歩					6
	銀		歩	銀					7
	角	金		金					8
香	桂	玉							9

☗ pieces in hand: –

==== Castle Tower Mino ====
Tower Mino
☖ pieces in hand: –

9	8	7	6	5	4	3	2	1
									1
							角		2
									3
									4
									5
歩	歩	歩							6
	玉		歩	歩					7
	角	銀		金					8
香	桂		金						9

☗ pieces in hand: –

There is also a common Left Mino variant known as Tower Mino (天守閣美濃 tenshukaku minō) that positions the king above the bishop's head, which allows the king to stay out of the diagonal of the opponent's bishop as shown to the right.

Another reason for this 87 king position is because it is faster to create: the usual right-side Mino castle has the king positioned on the second file from the edge. However, on the left side this position is occupied by the bishop, so extra moves are required to move the bishop out of the king's way.

==== Four-Piece Mino ====
Four-Piece Mino
☖ pieces in hand: –

9	8	7	6	5	4	3	2	1
									1
									2
									3
									4
									5
歩	歩	歩							6
	玉	銀	歩	歩					7
	角	銀		金					8
香	桂		金						9

☗ pieces in hand: –
Four-piece Mino
☖ pieces in hand: –

9	8	7	6	5	4	3	2	1
									1
									2
									3
									4
									5
					歩	歩		歩	6
				歩		銀	歩		7
				金		銀	玉		8
					金		桂	香	9

☗ pieces in hand: –

Four Piece Mino (四枚美濃 yonmai minō)

=== Other Mino variants ===
Gold Mino
☖ pieces in hand: –

9	8	7	6	5	4	3	2	1
									1
									2
									3
									4
									5
								歩	6
				歩	歩	歩	歩		7
					銀	金	玉		8
				金			桂	香	9

☗ pieces in hand: –
Diamond Mino
☖ pieces in hand: –

9	8	7	6	5	4	3	2	1
									1
									2
									3
									4
									5
					歩				6
				歩	銀	歩	歩	歩	7
				金		銀	玉		8
					金		桂	香	9

☗ pieces in hand: –

Top Knot Mino
☖ pieces in hand: –

9	8	7	6	5	4	3	2	1
									1
									2
									3
									4
									5
							歩		6
				歩	歩	歩		歩	7
				金		銀	玉		8
					金		桂	香	9

☗ pieces in hand: –
Bald Mino
☖ pieces in hand: –

9	8	7	6	5	4	3	2	1
									1
									2
									3
									4
									5
									6
				歩	歩	歩		歩	7
						銀	玉		8
					金		桂	香	9

☗ pieces in hand: –

Golden Hatch Castle
☖ pieces in hand: –

9	8	7	6	5	4	3	2	1
									1
									2
									3
									4
									5
									6
				歩	歩	歩	歩	歩	7
						金	玉		8
						銀	桂	香	9

☗ pieces in hand: –
Four Piece Silver Crown
☖ pieces in hand: –

9	8	7	6	5	4	3	2	1
									1
									2
									3
									4
									5
					歩	歩	歩	歩	6
				歩	金	桂	銀		7
					銀	金	玉		8
								香	9

☗ pieces in hand: –

- Gold Mino (金美濃 kin minō)
- Diamond Mino (ダイヤモンド美濃 daiyamondo minō)
- Top Knot Mino (ちょんまげ美濃 chonmage minō)
- Bald Mino or Bonze Mino (坊主美濃 bōzu minō)

== See also ==
- Castle (shogi)

== Bibliography ==
- Aono, Teruichi (2009) [First published in 1983]. Better Moves for Better Shogi. Translated by Fairbairn, John (2nd ed.). Ishi Press. ISBN 978-4-87187-999-6.
- Fairbairn, John (1984). Shogi for Beginners. Ishi Press. ISBN 978-4-8718-720-10.
- Hosking, Tony (1996). The Art of Shogi. The Shogi Foundation. ISBN 978-0-95310-890-9.
- Kaneko, Takashi (2003). Storming the Mino Castle 200. Translated by Sams, Richard. Nekomado. ISBN 978-4905225058.
- Kitao, Madoka (2011). Joseki at a glance. Translated by Kawasaki, Tomohide. Nekomado. ISBN 978-4-9052-2501-0.
- Kitao, Madoka (2012). Edge attack at a glance. Translated by Kawasaki, Tomohide. Nekomado. ISBN 978-4-9052-2502-7.
- Kitao, Madoka (2013). Sabaki at a glance. Translated by Kawasaki, Tomohide. Nekomado. ISBN 978-4-9052-2510-2.
- Kitao, Madoka (2014). Ending attack at a glance. Translated by Kawasaki, Tomohide. Nekomado. ISBN 978-4-9052-2513-3.
- 湯川, 博士 (2005). 振り飛車党列伝. 毎日コミュニケーションズ. ISBN 4-8399-1888-0.
