= Central Rook =

Central Rook
☖ pieces in hand: –

9	8	7	6	5	4	3	2	1
									1
									2
									3
									4
									5
		歩	歩						6
歩	歩			歩	歩	歩	歩	歩	7
	角		銀	飛					8
香	桂		金	玉	金	銀	桂	香	9

☗ pieces in hand: –

In shogi, Central Rook (中飛車 nakabisha) is a subclass of Ranging Rook openings in which the rook is positioned on the fifth (central) file.

However, since the central file can be thought of as the dividing line between Ranging Rook and Static Rook positions, it is also possible to find Static Rook positions using a rook that has been moved to the central file. These strategies are generally categorized as subclasses of the particular Static Rook opening. For example, Central Rook Yagura (矢倉中飛車) is a Yagura opening that uses a central rook.

The term 中飛車 without modification refers to Ranging Rook Central Rook strategies while Static Rook central rook strategies have another word modifying 中飛車.

== Central Rook subcategories ==
Closing Bishop's Diagonal (Black)
☖ pieces in hand: –

9	8	7	6	5	4	3	2	1
									1
							角		2
					歩		歩	歩	3
						歩			4
									5
		歩	歩						6
歩	歩			歩	歩	歩	歩	歩	7
	角						飛		8
香	桂	銀	金	玉	金	銀	桂	香	9

☗ pieces in hand: –
P-66

Ranging Rook strategies like Central Rook are also traditionally played by White against Black's Static Rook position. However, in the modern era (that is, later than the Edo period), Normal Central Rook is played by both White and Black.

The traditional way to play Central Rook is for the player to close their bishop diagonal with a pawn advanced to the 66 square when played by Black or advanced to 44 when played by White. This contrasts with a Central Rook position that allows a bishop trade to occur at any time, such as Cheerful Central Rook.

Games that have the bishop diagonal closed are known as slow games.

== Castles ==
Incomplete Mino
☖ pieces in hand: –

9	8	7	6	5	4	3	2	1
									1
									2
									3
									4
									5
								歩	6
					歩	歩	歩		7
				飛		銀	玉		8
					金		桂	香	9

☗ pieces in hand: –
Anaguma
☖ pieces in hand: –

9	8	7	6	5	4	3	2	1
									1
									2
									3
									4
									5
									6
					歩	歩	歩	歩	7
				飛		金	銀	香	8
						金	桂	玉	9

☗ pieces in hand: –

The Central Rook player will commonly use either a Mino or Anaguma castle.

Central Rook Incomplete Mino
☖ pieces in hand: –

9	8	7	6	5	4	3	2	1
香	桂				金		桂	香	1
	飛		銀	金	銀	王	角		2
歩					歩		歩	歩	3
		歩	歩	歩		歩			4
	歩								5
		歩	歩	歩					6
歩	歩	角	銀		歩	歩	歩	歩	7
		金		飛		銀	玉		8
香	桂				金		桂	香	9

☗ pieces in hand: –

Since the rook is positioned on the fifth file, it prevents the player from making the usual Mino castle.

Therefore, Central Rook's castle is often an Incomplete Mino.

In the adjacent diagram, Black has formed a Central Rook position with an Incomplete Mino castle on the right side of the board. Black's left gold is then moved to the 78 square in order to strength the defense on the either file from White's Static Rook pressure as well as being a deterrent against future bishop or rook drops.

As with most Ranging Rook openings, Central Rook openings tend to have the castle construction on the player's right side of the board.

However, since a central file is on the border of Ranging Rook and Static Rook positions, it is also possible to castle the player's king on the left side. This idea is used in the Central Rook Left Anaguma strategy.

== White's Normal Central Rook ==
First moves
☖ pieces in hand: –

9	8	7	6	5	4	3	2	1
香	桂	銀	金	王	金	銀	桂	香	1
	飛						角		2
歩	歩	歩	歩	歩			歩	歩	3
					歩	歩			4
									5
		歩					歩		6
歩	歩		歩	歩	歩	歩		歩	7
	角						飛		8
香	桂	銀	金	玉	金	銀	桂	香	9

☗ pieces in hand: –

The opening starts by the usual four-move sequence that characterizes Static Rook vs Ranging Rook (居飛車対振り飛車) games as shown in the board position on the right. (See: Normal Ranging Rook.)

Up to move 6
☖ pieces in hand: –

9	8	7	6	5	4	3	2	1
香	桂	銀	金	王	金		桂	香	1
	飛				銀		角		2
歩	歩	歩	歩	歩			歩	歩	3
					歩	歩			4
									5
		歩					歩		6
歩	歩		歩	歩	歩	歩		歩	7
	角				銀		飛		8
香	桂	銀	金	玉	金		桂	香	9

☗ pieces in hand: –
Up to move 7
☖ pieces in hand: –

9	8	7	6	5	4	3	2	1
香	桂	銀	金	王	金		桂	香	1
	飛				銀		角		2
歩	歩	歩	歩	歩			歩	歩	3
					歩	歩			4
									5
		歩		歩			歩		6
歩	歩		歩		歩	歩		歩	7
	角				銀		飛		8
香	桂	銀	金	玉	金		桂	香	9

☗ pieces in hand: –

3. S-48. Black advances their right silver up and toward the center of the board. (This is a more flexible move than 3. S-38.)

3...S-42. White likewise moves their silver up and to toward the center. This move gives White the possibility of further moving the silver up to 64 through 53 (after a P-54 pawn push) as well to the 43 square (to defend the head of the bishop at 34 square if bishop moves to 33 to prevent Black from trading off their rook pawn) or the 33 square to prevent Black's rook pawn trade off after the bishops are traded off the board. This left silver will likely be a main component of White's counterattack.

Although White also has the choice of moving their rook for this move (3...R-52), moving their silver first instead keeps White's strategy more uncertain as well as giving White the option of playing a Double Yagura position (which is a Static Rook opening). However, moving the silver to 42 now does delay ranging the rook to any other Ranging Rook positions on the fourth, third, and second files since the silver on rank 2 blocks the rook movement.

4. P-56. This prepares for various Static Rook strategies.

Up to move 8
☖ pieces in hand: –

9	8	7	6	5	4	3	2	1
香	桂	銀	金	王	金		桂	香	1
	飛				銀		角		2
歩	歩	歩	歩				歩	歩	3
				歩	歩	歩			4
									5
		歩		歩			歩		6
歩	歩		歩		歩	歩		歩	7
	角				銀		飛		8
香	桂	銀	金	玉	金		桂	香	9

☗ pieces in hand: –
Up to move 9
☖ pieces in hand: –

9	8	7	6	5	4	3	2	1
香	桂	銀	金	王	金		桂	香	1
	飛				銀		角		2
歩	歩	歩	歩				歩	歩	3
				歩	歩	歩			4
									5
		歩		歩			歩		6
歩	歩		歩		歩	歩		歩	7
	角			金	銀		飛		8
香	桂	銀	金	玉			桂	香	9

☗ pieces in hand: –

Boat Castle
☖ pieces in hand: –

9	8	7	6	5	4	3	2	1
									1
									2
									3
									4
									5
歩		歩		歩					6
	歩		歩						7
	角	玉		金					8
香	桂	銀	金						9

☗ pieces in hand: –

4...P-54.

5. G49-58. Black begins their castle formation by moving their right gold to the center file. Following this move, Black can start moving their king into castle.

The usual fortification is initially a Boat castle. Since the Boat castle is fairly weak castle, Black can later transition the Boat into stronger castles (such as an Anaguma or Left Mino, among others).

Up to move 10
☖ pieces in hand: –

9	8	7	6	5	4	3	2	1
香	桂	銀	金	王	金		桂	香	1
				飛	銀		角		2
歩	歩	歩	歩				歩	歩	3
				歩	歩	歩			4
									5
		歩		歩			歩		6
歩	歩		歩		歩	歩		歩	7
	角			金	銀		飛		8
香	桂	銀	金	玉			桂	香	9

☗ pieces in hand: –
Up to move 14
☖ pieces in hand: –

9	8	7	6	5	4	3	2	1
香	桂	銀	金		金		桂	香	1
		王		飛	銀		角		2
歩	歩	歩	歩				歩	歩	3
				歩	歩	歩			4
									5
		歩		歩			歩		6
歩	歩		歩		歩	歩		歩	7
	角	玉		金	銀		飛		8
香	桂	銀	金				桂	香	9

☗ pieces in hand: –

5...R-52. This move signals White's Central Rook strategy. Since the rook has moved to the center, White can now start their castle development.

6. K-68 K-62, 7. K-78 K-72. After seeing White's rook movement, Black usually starts moving their king away from their rook and toward the king's castle position. White likewise mirrors Black's king movements.

Up to move 16
☖ pieces in hand: –

9	8	7	6	5	4	3	2	1
香	桂	銀	金		金		桂	香	1
		王		飛	銀		角		2
	歩	歩	歩				歩	歩	3
歩				歩	歩	歩			4
									5
歩		歩		歩			歩		6
	歩		歩		歩	歩		歩	7
	角	玉		金	銀		飛		8
香	桂	銀	金				桂	香	9

☗ pieces in hand: –

8. P-96 P-94. Black advances their ninth file edge pawn to give the king more flexibility for escape in the end game. With this move, Black's Boat castle is complete. White responds likewise opening an escape hatch for their king with an edge pawn push.

Around this point, Black has a choice between attacking White on the right side of the board or attacking White closer to the center files.

In the first choice, since Black is fighting from the side, White can respond by building a Mino castle since Mino castles are quick to form and provide a good defense from the side attacks. This is shown in the immediately following subsection.

For Black's central attack, White may choose to build an Anaguma castle since this type of castle is stronger for defending against attacks from above compared with a Mino castle as shown in the subsequent subsection.

=== White's Mino vs Black's right side attack ===
Up to move 17
☖ pieces in hand: –

9	8	7	6	5	4	3	2	1
香	桂	銀	金		金		桂	香	1
		王		飛	銀		角		2
	歩	歩	歩				歩	歩	3
歩				歩	歩	歩			4
									5
歩		歩		歩		歩	歩		6
	歩		歩		歩			歩	7
	角	玉		金	銀		飛		8
香	桂	銀	金				桂	香	9

☗ pieces in hand: –
Up to move 18
☖ pieces in hand: –

9	8	7	6	5	4	3	2	1
香	桂	銀	金		金		桂	香	1
		王		飛			角		2
	歩	歩	歩		銀		歩	歩	3
歩				歩	歩	歩			4
									5
歩		歩		歩		歩	歩		6
	歩		歩		歩			歩	7
	角	玉		金	銀		飛		8
香	桂	銀	金				桂	香	9

☗ pieces in hand: –

9. P-36.

9...S-43.

Up to move 20
☖ pieces in hand: –

9	8	7	6	5	4	3	2	1
香	桂	銀	金		金		桂	香	1
		王		飛					2
	歩	歩	歩		銀	角	歩	歩	3
歩				歩	歩	歩			4
							歩		5
歩		歩		歩		歩			6
	歩		歩		歩			歩	7
	角	玉		金	銀		飛		8
香	桂	銀	金				桂	香	9

☗ pieces in hand: –
Up to move 21
☖ pieces in hand: –

9	8	7	6	5	4	3	2	1
香	桂	銀	金		金		桂	香	1
		王		飛					2
	歩	歩	歩		銀	角	歩	歩	3
歩				歩	歩	歩			4
							歩		5
歩		歩		歩		歩			6
	歩		歩		歩			歩	7
	角	玉	銀	金	銀		飛		8
香	桂		金				桂	香	9

☗ pieces in hand: –

10. P-25 B-33.

11. S-68.

Up to move 22
☖ pieces in hand: –

9	8	7	6	5	4	3	2	1
香	桂	銀	金		金		桂	香	1
	王			飛					2
	歩	歩	歩		銀	角	歩	歩	3
歩				歩	歩	歩			4
							歩		5
歩		歩		歩		歩			6
	歩		歩		歩			歩	7
	角	玉	銀	金	銀		飛		8
香	桂		金				桂	香	9

☗ pieces in hand: –

11...K-82. White continues castling their king to the eighth file. In this position, White can construct a Mino castle. However, it is also possible to move the king further to the 91 corner in order to build an Anaguma.

==== Transpositions ====
The sequence of moves shown above can also be flexibly transposed to different orders. Below are some other possible move sequences leading to the same position.

	Black (Note: This first alternate sequence is the order suggested by Hosking.)	White	Black	White	Black	White	Black	White	Black	White
4.	...	R-52	...	R-52	...	P-54	...	P-54	...	P-54
5.	K-68	K-62	K-68	K-62	G49-58	R-52	G49-58	R-52	K-68	R-52
6.	K-78	K-72	K-78	K-72	K-68	K-62	K-68	K-62	K-78	K-62
7.	G49-58	K-82	G49-58	P-54	K-78	K-72	K-78	K-72	G49-58	K-72
8.	P-96	P-94	P-25	B-33	P-96	P-94	S-68	S-43	P-96	P-94
9.	P-36	S-43	P-36	S-43	S-68	K-82	P-36	K-82	P-36	K-82
10.	P-25	B-33	P-96	P-94	P-36	S-43	P-96	P-94	P-25	B-33
11.	S-68	P-54	S-68	K-82	P-25	B-33	P-25	B-33	S-68	S-43

==== Silver Horns formation ====
Kimura Mino with Silver Horns Central Rook
☖ pieces in hand: –

9	8	7	6	5	4	3	2	1
									1
									2
									3
									4
									5
歩		歩	歩		歩	歩		歩	6
	歩	角	銀		銀		歩		7
		金				金	玉		8
香	桂			飛			桂	香	9

☗ pieces in hand: –
Silver Horns Central Rook variant
☖ pieces in hand: –

9	8	7	6	5	4	3	2	1
									1
									2
									3
									4
									5
歩		歩	歩		歩	歩		歩	6
	歩	桂	銀		銀	桂	歩		7
		金	角			金	玉		8
香				飛				香	9

☗ pieces in hand: –

A Central Rook Silver Horns (ツノ銀中飛車 tsuno gin nakabisha) structure is also possible. This strategy uses a Kimura Mino (木村美濃) castle.

==== White's Anaguma vs Black's central attack ====
Up to move 13
☖ pieces in hand: –

9	8	7	6	5	4	3	2	1
香	桂	銀	金		金		桂	香	1
		王		飛	銀		角		2
歩	歩	歩	歩	歩			歩	歩	3
					歩	歩			4
									5
		歩		歩			歩		6
歩	歩		歩	銀	歩	歩		歩	7
	角	玉					飛		8
香	桂	銀	金		金		桂	香	9

☗ pieces in hand: –

7. S-57. If Black is attempting a central attack, they will start advancing their right silver upward on the fifth file.

== Cheerful Central Rook ==
Cheerful Central Rook (White)
☖ pieces in hand: –

9	8	7	6	5	4	3	2	1
香	桂	銀	金	王	金	銀	桂	香	1
				飛			角		2
歩	歩	歩	歩		歩		歩	歩	3
				歩		歩			4
							歩		5
		歩							6
歩	歩		歩	歩	歩	歩		歩	7
	角						飛		8
香	桂	銀	金	玉	金	銀	桂	香	9

☗ pieces in hand: –

Another variant of Central Rook called Cheerful Central Rook (ゴキゲン中飛車 gokigen nakabisha) keeps the bishop diagonal open. This is a more aggressive strategy since the bishops may be exchanged at any time during the opening.

== See also ==
- Cheerful Central Rook
- Central Rook Silver Horns
- Ranging Rook
- Shogi opening

== Bibliography ==
- Fairbairn, John (1986). Shogi for beginners (2nd ed.). Ishi Press. ISBN 978-4-8718-720-10.
- Hodges, George, ed. (1977). "Opening series: How to play the nakabisha, the central rook opening part 1". Shogi (6). Translated by Fairbairn, John: 10–13.
- Hodges, George, ed. (1977). "Opening series: How to play the nakabisha, the central rook opening part 2". Shogi (7). Translated by Fairbairn, John: 12–15.
- Hodges, George, ed. (1977). "Opening series: How to play the nakabisha, the central rook opening part 3". Shogi (8). Translated by Fairbairn, John: 12–14.
- Hodges, George, ed. (1977). "Opening series: How to play the nakabisha, the central rook opening part 4". Shogi (9). Translated by Fairbairn, John: 2, 16–18.
- Hodges, George, ed. (1978). "Opening series: How to play the nakabisha, the central rook opening part 5". Shogi (11). Translated by Fairbairn, John: 4–7.
- Hodges, George, ed. (1978). "Opening series: How to play the nakabisha, the central rook opening part 6". Shogi (12). Translated by Fairbairn, John: 4–7.
- Hosking, Tony (1996). The art of shogi. The Shogi Foundation. ISBN 978-0-95310-890-9.
- Kitao, Madoka (2011). Joseki at a glance. Translated by Kawasaki, Tomohide. Nekomado. ISBN 978-4-9052-2501-0.
- Kitao, Madoka (2013). Sabaki at a glance. Translated by Kawasaki, Tomohide. Nekomado. ISBN 978-4-9052-2510-2.
- Yebisu, Miles (2016). Comprehensive shogi guide in English: How to play Japanese chess. Laboratory Publishing.
