= Shogi opening =

Initial moves in a game of shogi

Double Static Rook opening
☖ pieces in hand: 角

| 9 | 8 | 7 | 6 | 5 | 4 | 3 | 2 | 1 |
| 香 | | | 金 | | | | 桂 | 香 | 1 |
| | 飛 | | | | 王 | 金 | | | 2 |
| 歩 | | 桂 | 銀 | 歩 | 歩 | 銀 | 歩 | 歩 | 3 |
| | | 歩 | 歩 | | | 歩 | | | 4 |
| | 歩 | | | | | | 歩 | | 5 |
| | | 歩 | | | 歩 | 歩 | | | 6 |
| 歩 | 歩 | 銀 | 歩 | 歩 | 銀 | 桂 | | 歩 | 7 |
| | | 金 | 玉 | | 金 | | 飛 | | 8 |
| 香 | 桂 | | | | | | | 香 | 9 |

☗ pieces in hand: 角
Both players are using a Static Rook opening against each other in which the rook (飛) attacks along its starting files (file 2 and file 8). This particular popular opening is known as Bishop Exchange since the bishops have been exchanged off the board so that both players have their bishop in hand for dropping at strategic places later in the game. This board position is after 26 moves (or 13 move pairs).

A shogi opening (戦法 senpō) is the sequence of initial moves of a shogi game before the middle game. The more general Japanese term for the beginning of the game is joban (序盤).

A jōseki (定跡) is the especially recommended sequence of moves for a given opening that was considered balanced play at one point in time for both sides by professional players. (However, some jōsekis have become outdated when they are reevaluated to no longer give balanced play.) Jōsekis also typically include commentary about the possible reasons to deviate from the jōseki especially regarding blunders.

Note that not all openings have jōsekis. For example, trap openings like Demon Slayer, while they may have standard moves, are considered to favor one player and are not balanced play. Thus, the Demon Slayer opening is not a jōseki.

== Introduction ==
Bishop Diagonal First Move
☖ pieces in hand: –

| 9 | 8 | 7 | 6 | 5 | 4 | 3 | 2 | 1 |
| 香 | 桂 | 銀 | 金 | 王 | 金 | 銀 | 桂 | 香 | 1 |
| | 飛 | | | | | | 角 | | 2 |
| 歩 | 歩 | 歩 | 歩 | 歩 | 歩 | 歩 | 歩 | 歩 | 3 |
| | | | | | | | | | 4 |
| | | | | | | | | | 5 |
| | | 歩 | | | | | | | 6 |
| 歩 | 歩 | | 歩 | 歩 | 歩 | 歩 | 歩 | 歩 | 7 |
| | 角 | | | | | | 飛 | | 8 |
| 香 | 桂 | 銀 | 金 | 玉 | 金 | 銀 | 桂 | 香 | 9 |

☗ pieces in hand: –
1. P-76
Rook Pawn First Move
☖ pieces in hand: –

| 9 | 8 | 7 | 6 | 5 | 4 | 3 | 2 | 1 |
| 香 | 桂 | 銀 | 金 | 王 | 金 | 銀 | 桂 | 香 | 1 |
| | 飛 | | | | | | 角 | | 2 |
| 歩 | 歩 | 歩 | 歩 | 歩 | 歩 | 歩 | 歩 | 歩 | 3 |
| | | | | | | | | | 4 |
| | | | | | | | | | 5 |
| | | | | | | | 歩 | | 6 |
| 歩 | 歩 | 歩 | 歩 | 歩 | 歩 | 歩 | | 歩 | 7 |
| | 角 | | | | | | 飛 | | 8 |
| 香 | 桂 | 銀 | 金 | 玉 | 金 | 銀 | 桂 | 香 | 9 |

☗ pieces in hand: –
1. P-26

The very first opening moves in most games are pawn pushes. In particular, most games start with two types of pawn pushes. A player can move the rook pawn forward (P-26) as the first type of pawn push, or, more commonly, advance the seventh file pawn to open the bishop's diagonal for attacking (P-76) as the second type of pawn push. Strategically, these two moves aim to activate the two most powerful pieces in the game.

1. P-76 P-34
☖ pieces in hand: –

| 9 | 8 | 7 | 6 | 5 | 4 | 3 | 2 | 1 |
| | | | | | | | | | 1 |
| | | | | | | | | | 2 |
| 歩 | 歩 | 歩 | 歩 | 歩 | 歩 | | 歩 | 歩 | 3 |
| | | | | | | 歩 | | | 4 |
| | | | | | | | | | 5 |
| | | 歩 | | | | | | | 6 |
| 歩 | 歩 | | 歩 | 歩 | 歩 | 歩 | 歩 | 歩 | 7 |
| | | | | | | | | | 8 |
| | | | | | | | | | 9 |

☗ pieces in hand: –
1. P-76 P-84
☖ pieces in hand: –

| 9 | 8 | 7 | 6 | 5 | 4 | 3 | 2 | 1 |
| | | | | | | | | | 1 |
| | | | | | | | | | 2 |
| 歩 | | 歩 | 歩 | 歩 | 歩 | 歩 | 歩 | 歩 | 3 |
| | 歩 | | | | | | | | 4 |
| | | | | | | | | | 5 |
| | | 歩 | | | | | | | 6 |
| 歩 | 歩 | | 歩 | 歩 | 歩 | 歩 | 歩 | 歩 | 7 |
| | | | | | | | | | 8 |
| | | | | | | | | | 9 |

☗ pieces in hand: –
1. P-26 P-34
☖ pieces in hand: –

| 9 | 8 | 7 | 6 | 5 | 4 | 3 | 2 | 1 |
| | | | | | | | | | 1 |
| | | | | | | | | | 2 |
| 歩 | 歩 | 歩 | 歩 | 歩 | 歩 | | 歩 | 歩 | 3 |
| | | | | | | 歩 | | | 4 |
| | | | | | | | | | 5 |
| | | | | | | | 歩 | | 6 |
| 歩 | 歩 | 歩 | 歩 | 歩 | 歩 | 歩 | | 歩 | 7 |
| | | | | | | | | | 8 |
| | | | | | | | | | 9 |

☗ pieces in hand: –
1. P-26 P-84
☖ pieces in hand: –

| 9 | 8 | 7 | 6 | 5 | 4 | 3 | 2 | 1 |
| | | | | | | | | | 1 |
| | | | | | | | | | 2 |
| 歩 | | 歩 | 歩 | 歩 | 歩 | 歩 | 歩 | 歩 | 3 |
| | 歩 | | | | | | | | 4 |
| | | | | | | | | | 5 |
| | | | | | | | 歩 | | 6 |
| 歩 | 歩 | 歩 | 歩 | 歩 | 歩 | 歩 | | 歩 | 7 |
| | | | | | | | | | 8 |
| | | | | | | | | | 9 |

☗ pieces in hand: –

Furthermore, these two types of pawn pushes are the most common moves for both Black and White (which would be 1..P-84 and 1..P-34). Thus, almost all games (over 90%) will start with one of the four possible combinations of these two pawn push types (see adjacent diagrams).

With a bishop diagonal first move (P-76 or P-34), it is common to exchange bishops by having one capture the other (although not necessarily at the beginning of the opening). This allows each player to put their newly captured bishop into play anywhere on the board on their next move although care must be taken to avoid weaknesses in defense which may allow for a bishop drop from their opponent. However, it is not advantageous to exchange bishops if your opponent has a better defensive setup or more lines of attack. Moreover, making a bishop exchange constitutes tempo loss, so it is not advised without a good reason. Opening the bishop diagonal as the first move is the most flexible first move, which leads to the largest number of opening possibilities. Additionally, although P-76 and P-34 may occur as the first two moves allowing for a bishop trade off, it is always possible that either Black or White can prevent an early bishop exchange by closing their bishop diagonal with a subsequent pawn push – P-66 for Black or P-44 for White.

With the rook pawn first move (P-26 or P-84), the intention is usually to keep the rook on its initial file on the player's right side of the board and develop an attack on this side with support from the rook. Compared with opening the bishop diagonal for the first move, a rook pawn push limits the range of opening possibilities for the player and for their opponent. Additionally, it signals to their opponent that they will be playing against a Static Rook position (see below for the definition of Static Rook). Thus, 1. P-26 is comparatively more informative of a player's planned strategy.

Central Pawn First Move
☖ pieces in hand: –

| 9 | 8 | 7 | 6 | 5 | 4 | 3 | 2 | 1 |
| 香 | 桂 | 銀 | 金 | 王 | 金 | 銀 | 桂 | 香 | 1 |
| | 飛 | | | | | | 角 | | 2 |
| 歩 | 歩 | 歩 | 歩 | 歩 | 歩 | 歩 | 歩 | 歩 | 3 |
| | | | | | | | | | 4 |
| | | | | | | | | | 5 |
| | | | | 歩 | | | | | 6 |
| 歩 | 歩 | 歩 | 歩 | | 歩 | 歩 | 歩 | 歩 | 7 |
| | 角 | | | | | | 飛 | | 8 |
| 香 | 桂 | 銀 | 金 | 玉 | 金 | 銀 | 桂 | 香 | 9 |

☗ pieces in hand: –
1. P-56

A third common first move is to push the central pawn (P-56). However, P-56 is an order of magnitude less common than the other P-76 and P-26 moves. With the central pawn push first move, the player most often is preparing to move their rook to the central fifth file in order to support this central pawn push (See: Central Rook). However, other configurations (such as Opposing Rook) are possible.

Many common opening attacks involve advancing a silver and ideally pawns, protected by other pieces. Because silvers have more possibilities for retreat, silvers are generally considered superior as attacking pieces in the opening and middle game while golds better defend their sides and are superior as defensive pieces. It is common practice to defend the king with three generals, two golds and a silver.

Because defense is so important, and because shogi pieces are relatively slow movers, the opening game tends to be much longer in shogi than in western chess, commonly with a dozen or more moves to shore up defenses before the initial attack is made. As part of the defense, typically the king is moved to the side in a castle with three generals. Leaving a king on its original square (居玉 igyoku 'sitting king') may be a particularly dangerous position.

Over the past 400 years, Japanese professional players have invented various jōseki (定跡), which determine moves and sequences which are thought to be the best for a particular situation. It also covers a branch of different variations within an intricate strategy, including alternative options and the certain consequences that some moves may bring.

Shogi openings are generally slower than that of western chess, due to the larger board and less mobile pieces. But since a quick offense will leave a player's home territory open to drop attacks as soon as pieces are exchanged, one aim of the opening is to build up defenses for the king. (See: Castle.)

== Classification ==
=== Rook position ===
Static Rook
☖ pieces in hand: –

| 9 | 8 | 7 | 6 | 5 | 4 | 3 | 2 | 1 |
| | | | | | | | | | 1 |
| | | | | | | | | | 2 |
| | | | | | | | | | 3 |
| | | | | | | | | | 4 |
| | | | | | | | 歩 | | 5 |
| | | | | | | | | | 6 |
| 歩 | 歩 | 歩 | 歩 | 歩 | 歩 | 歩 | | 歩 | 7 |
| | 角 | | | | | | 飛 | | 8 |
| 香 | 桂 | 金 | 銀 | 玉 | 金 | 銀 | 桂 | 香 | 9 |

☗ pieces in hand: –
Ranging Rook
☖ pieces in hand: –

| 9 | 8 | 7 | 6 | 5 | 4 | 3 | 2 | 1 |
| | | | | | | | | | 1 |
| | | | | | | | | | 2 |
| | | | | | | | | | 3 |
| | | | | | | | | | 4 |
| | | 歩 | | | | | | | 5 |
| | | | | | | | | | 6 |
| 歩 | 歩 | | 歩 | 歩 | 歩 | 歩 | 歩 | 歩 | 7 |
| | 角 | 飛 | | | | | | | 8 |
| 香 | 桂 | 金 | 銀 | 玉 | 金 | 銀 | 桂 | 香 | 9 |

☗ pieces in hand: –

Openings for even games are traditionally classified by the position of a player's rook – specifically whether it remains on its starting square or moves to a different square. In this binary classification, Static Rook (居飛車 ibisha) openings are where the offense is supported by the rook in its original position. Ranging Rook (振り飛車 furibisha) openings are where the rook moves to the center or left of the board to support an attack there, typically with the idea of allowing the opponent to attack while arranging a better defense and aiming for a counterattack. Before the modern era, shogi openings were categorized by both the position of the rook (whether Static Rook or not) and by the position of bishop (whether Static Bishop or not).

Openings are further subcategorized based on the opening each player chooses:

1. Double Static Rook (相居飛車 aiibisha or 両居飛車) [that is, Black Static Rook vs White Static Rook]
2. Static Rook vs Ranging Rook (居飛車対振り飛車 ibisha tai furibisha)
3. Ranging Rook vs Static Rook (振り飛車対居飛車 furibisha tai ibisha)
4. Double Ranging Rook (相振り飛車 aifuribisha)

==== Interaction with castles ====
As the most powerful piece on the board, the rook invites attack, and in most cases, especially for inexperienced players, it is a good idea to keep the king well away from the rook. Relatedly, the Static vs Ranging classification corresponds to castle development: static rook positions with the rook on the right side of the board tend to have castles on the left side of the board while ranging rook positions tend to have castles on the right side.

Bear-in-the-hole Static Rook
vs
Central Rook
☖ pieces in hand: –

| 9 | 8 | 7 | 6 | 5 | 4 | 3 | 2 | 1 |
| 香 | | | | | 金 | | 桂 | 香 | 1 |
| | 王 | 金 | | 飛 | | | | | 2 |
| | 歩 | 桂 | 銀 | | 銀 | 角 | 歩 | 歩 | 3 |
| 歩 | | 歩 | 歩 | 歩 | 歩 | 歩 | | | 4 |
| | | | | | | | 歩 | | 5 |
| | | 歩 | 歩 | 歩 | | | | | 6 |
| 歩 | 歩 | 角 | 金 | 銀 | 歩 | 歩 | | 歩 | 7 |
| 香 | 銀 | | | | | | 飛 | | 8 |
| 玉 | 桂 | 金 | | | | | 桂 | 香 | 9 |

☗ pieces in hand: –

The adjacent diagram shows a Static Rook vs Ranging Rook game. Here Black (the first move player on the bottom of the diagram indicated with (☗) is playing Bear-in-the-hole Static Rook with their rook remaining on its starting square and a Bear-in-the-hole castle on the left side of their board while White (☖) is playing Central Rook (a Ranging Rook position) in which their rook has moved to the central fifth file and their king placed in a Kimura Mino castle on the right side of their board.

Fortress
☖ pieces in hand: –

| 9 | 8 | 7 | 6 | 5 | 4 | 3 | 2 | 1 |
| | | | | | | | | | 1 |
| | 飛 | | | | | | | | 2 |
| | | | | | | | | | 3 |
| | | | | | | | | | 4 |
| | | | | | | | | | 5 |
| | | 歩 | 歩 | 歩 | | | | | 6 |
| 歩 | 歩 | 銀 | 金 | | | | | | 7 |
| | 玉 | 金 | | | | 龍 | | | 8 |
| 香 | 桂 | | | | | | | | 9 |

☗ pieces in hand: –

Certain castles are traditionally thought to be more appropriate for particular Black/White opening combinations. For example, Fortress castle is a strong defense against an opponent's headlong Static Rook attacks, but it is a weaker choice for a Ranging Rook opponent as the Fortress does not provide as much defense against side attacks (since the gold on 78 is only defended by the king), which are likely to occur when the Ranging Rook player's rook breaks through the right side of Black's camp.

==== Static Rook ====
Static Rook
☖ pieces in hand: –

| 9 | 8 | 7 | 6 | 5 | 4 | 3 | 2 | 1 |
| | | | | | | | | | 1 |
| | | | | | | | | | 2 |
| | | | | | | | | | 3 |
| | | | | | | | | | 4 |
| | | | | | | | 歩 | | 5 |
| | | | | | | | | | 6 |
| 歩 | 歩 | 歩 | 歩 | 歩 | 歩 | 歩 | | 歩 | 7 |
| | 角 | | | | | | 飛 | | 8 |
| 香 | 桂 | 銀 | 金 | 玉 | 金 | 銀 | 桂 | 香 | 9 |

☗ pieces in hand: –

Static Rook openings usually have the player's rook at its start position, which is second file (28 square) for Black and the eighth file (82 square) for White.

Left Silver Crown Bear-in-the-hole
with Static Rook
☖ pieces in hand: –

| 9 | 8 | 7 | 6 | 5 | 4 | 3 | 2 | 1 |
| | | | | | | | | | 1 |
| | | | | | | | | | 2 |
| | | | | | | | | | 3 |
| | | | | | | | | | 4 |
| 歩 | | | | | | | 歩 | | 5 |
| | 歩 | 歩 | 歩 | | 銀 | 歩 | | 歩 | 6 |
| | 銀 | 角 | | 歩 | 歩 | | | | 7 |
| 香 | 金 | 金 | | | | | 飛 | | 8 |
| 玉 | 桂 | | | | | | 桂 | 香 | 9 |

☗ pieces in hand: –

Most Static Rook openings coincide with a castle development on the player's left side of the board. In the adjacent diagram is an example of a castle built on the left side of the board paired with a Static Rook position. The castle is a Left Silver Crown Bear-in-the-hole (with advanced edge pawn).

Further classification of Static Rook positions depends on response to the opponent's position of either Static Rook or Ranging Rook. Thus, there are the two types of Static Rook positions: Double Static Rook formations and Counter-Ranging Rook formations.

Examples of Static Rook openings are below.

- Double Static Rook types:
  - Fortress (矢倉)
  - Side Pawn Capture (横歩取り)
  - Bishop Exchange (角換わり)
  - Double Wing Attack (相掛かり)
  - Snowroof (雁木)
- Counter-Ranging Rook Static Rook types:
  - Left Silver-57 Rapid Attack (5七銀左急戦)
  - Super High Speed Silver-37 (超速3七銀)
  - Iijima Bishop Pullback (飯島流引き角)
- Static Rook types used for both Double Static Rook and Counter-Ranging Rook:
  - Right Fourth File Rook (右四間飛車)
  - Static Bishop Left Mino (居角左美濃)
  - Sleeve Rook (袖飛車) [Right Third File Rook]
- Uncommon Static Rook types:
  - First File Rook (一間飛車)
  - Feint Static Rook (陽動居飛車)

==== Ranging Rook ====
Ranging Rook
☖ pieces in hand: –

| 9 | 8 | 7 | 6 | 5 | 4 | 3 | 2 | 1 |
| | | | | | | | | | 1 |
| | | | | | | | | | 2 |
| | | | | | | | | | 3 |
| | | | | | | | | | 4 |
| | | 歩 | | | | | | | 5 |
| | | | | | | | | | 6 |
| 歩 | 歩 | | 歩 | 歩 | 歩 | 歩 | 歩 | 歩 | 7 |
| | 角 | 飛 | | | | | | | 8 |
| 香 | 桂 | 銀 | 金 | 玉 | 金 | 銀 | 桂 | 香 | 9 |

☗ pieces in hand: –

Ranging Rook openings are positions in which the rook moves to the center or left of the board to support an attack there.

Fourth File Rook
☖ pieces in hand: –

| 9 | 8 | 7 | 6 | 5 | 4 | 3 | 2 | 1 |
| | | | | | | | | | 1 |
| | | | | | | | | | 2 |
| | | | | | | | | | 3 |
| | | | | | | | | | 4 |
| | | | | | | | | | 5 |
| | | 歩 | 歩 | | | | | 歩 | 6 |
| 歩 | 歩 | 角 | 銀 | 歩 | 歩 | 歩 | 歩 | | 7 |
| | | | 飛 | 金 | | 銀 | 玉 | | 8 |
| 香 | 桂 | | | | 金 | | 桂 | 香 | 9 |

☗ pieces in hand: –
with Mino castle

Most Ranging Rook openings coincide with a castle development on the player's right side of the board. In the adjacent diagram is an example of a castle built on the right side of the board paired with a Ranging Rook position (Fourth File Rook). The castle is a Mino castle.

Examples of Ranging Rook openings:

- Central Rook (中飛車)
  - Cheerful Central Rook (ゴキゲン中飛車中飛車)
- Fourth File Rook (四間飛車)
  - Fujii System (藤井システム)
- Third File Rook (三間飛車)
  - Quick Ishida (早石田)
  - 1... R-32 opening (2手目☖3二飛)
  - Demon Slayer (鬼殺し)
- Opposing Rook (向かい飛車)
  - Tonari opening (都成流)
- Double Ranging Rook (相振り飛車)
- Feint Ranging Rook (陽動振り飛車)

=== Attack initiation ===
The other traditional main categorization of shogi openings is based on the timing of a player's attack within the opening. A rapid attack (急戦 kyūsen) variation of an opening has a player initiating an attack with only a weaker castle developed first or with very minimal castle development and sometimes with no castle development at all (leaving the king in its start position). The opposite type is a slow game (持久戦 jikyūsen) in which both players spend much of the opening developing strong castles.

For example, Fourth File Rook is an opening that has one player moving their rook to the fourth file if playing as White (or the sixth file if playing as Black) while the opponent plays Static Rook with their rook in its start position. Fourth File Rook has several rapid attack variations and slow game variations that are identified by the attack formations of the Static Rook player. In the rapid attack variations, the Static Rook player constructs a Boat castle – a weaker castle – and quickly builds an attack formation. In the slow game variations, the Static Rook player will build stronger castles such as Bear-in-the-hole castle or Left Mino castle.

== History of opening research ==
Earliest shogi record (1587)
☖ pieces in hand: –

| 9 | 8 | 7 | 6 | 5 | 4 | 3 | 2 | 1 |
| 香 | 桂 | | | 飛 | | | 桂 | 香 | 1 |
| | 金 | 王 | | | | 金 | 銀 | | 2 |
| | 歩 | 歩 | 歩 | | 歩 | | 歩 | | 3 |
| 歩 | | | 銀 | | 角 | 歩 | | 歩 | 4 |
| | | | | 歩 | | | 歩 | | 5 |
| 歩 | | 歩 | | | | 銀 | | 歩 | 6 |
| | 歩 | 角 | 歩 | 歩 | 歩 | 歩 | | | 7 |
| | 銀 | 金 | | 玉 | | 金 | 飛 | | 8 |
| 香 | 桂 | | | | | | 桂 | 香 | 9 |

☗ pieces in hand: –
Ōhashi vs Hon'inbō (1607)
☖ pieces in hand: –

| 9 | 8 | 7 | 6 | 5 | 4 | 3 | 2 | 1 |
| 香 | 桂 | | 金 | | 金 | | 桂 | 香 | 1 |
| | | 王 | 銀 | | 飛 | | | | 2 |
| 歩 | 歩 | 歩 | 歩 | | 銀 | 角 | 歩 | 歩 | 3 |
| | | | | 歩 | 歩 | 歩 | | | 4 |
| | | | | | | | | | 5 |
| | | 歩 | | | 歩 | 歩 | 歩 | 歩 | 6 |
| 歩 | 歩 | | 歩 | 歩 | 銀 | | | | 7 |
| | 角 | 玉 | | 金 | 飛 | | | | 8 |
| 香 | 桂 | 銀 | 金 | | | | 桂 | 香 | 9 |

☗ pieces in hand: –

The earliest openings in the historical record are Sleeve Rook, Wrong Diagonal Bishop, Right Fourth File Rook, and the Ranging Rook openings – Central Rook, Fourth File Rook, Third File Rook, and Opposing Rook – which are found around 1600.

The earliest record of a shogi game (see adjacent diagram) is a single board position mentioned in the 家忠日記 Ietada Nikki (diary) of the Matsudaira clan dated 1587 February. The players are not known. Black appears to be playing a Static Rook position while White a Central Rook position. The position appears unrefined from a modern perspective.

The earliest full game record is a 1607 game between the First Lifetime Meijin Sōkei Ōhashi I (Black) and Hon'inbō Sansa (White). Black is playing a Right Fourth File Rook (Static Rook) position while White is playing a Fourth File Rook position. As the Ōhashi–Hon'inbō games are Ranging Rook games, it is believed that these two significantly developed the opening theory.

In 1615, the first handicap games – Right Lance (now obsolete) – are attested between Ōhashi and Hon'inbō.

A little later around 1625, a form of the Double Wing Attack opening appears. Later still are Snowroof, Fortress, and Bishop Exchange.

The 4th Lifetime Meijin, Sōkei Ōhashi III, who held the position 1691–1713, was responsible for making many advances in shogi opening research. However, after Ōhashi, opening theory developed relatively slowly. At the start of the tumultuous Meiji Restoration in 1868, opening research largely stopped. In the 1910s, shogi tournaments started to be sponsored by newspapers, which lead to renewed study of openings and the creations of new josekis. In particular, Yoshio Kimura, Chōtarō Hanada (花田長太郎), and Kingorō Kaneko (花田長太郎) led many opening innovations in the 1920s and 1930s.

=== Opening popularity ===
Old Double Wing
☖ pieces in hand: 歩

| 9 | 8 | 7 | 6 | 5 | 4 | 3 | 2 | 1 |
| 香 | 桂 | | 金 | 王 | 金 | 銀 | 桂 | 香 | 1 |
| | 飛 | | | | | | 角 | | 2 |
| 歩 | | 歩 | 歩 | 銀 | 歩 | | 歩 | 歩 | 3 |
| | | | | 歩 | | 歩 | | | 4 |
| | | | | | | | | | 5 |
| | | 歩 | | 歩 | | | | | 6 |
| 歩 | 歩 | | 歩 | 銀 | 歩 | 歩 | | 歩 | 7 |
| | 角 | | | | | | 飛 | | 8 |
| 香 | 桂 | 銀 | 金 | 玉 | 金 | | 桂 | 香 | 9 |

☗ pieces in hand: 歩

Over time the popularity of various opening theory has changed. For instance, the earliest games in the historical record were Black's Static Rook vs White's Ranging Rook. However, after the 8th Lifetime Meijin Sōkei Ōhashi VI was appointed in 1744, Double Static Rook openings became the standard way due to the superior winning results of Static Rook over Ranging Rook at the time, and Ranging Rook openings were mostly abandoned. It was not until the beginning of the 20th century that Ranging Rook openings became more popular. The popularity of Ranging Rook gained more ground with high winning results 1950s–1970s from strong Ranging Rook player Yasuharu Ōyama.

The opening principle of fighting for control of the center with both players pushing central pawns ☖...P-54 and ☗P-56 can be seen in older variations of Double Wing Attack opening. This way of playing was heavily researched and reached its pinnacle during 1790–1800 when the 9th Lifetime Meijin Soei Ōhashi wrote a book on it. Nowadays, this is considered old fashioned as control of the center is no longer emphasized in modern shogi theory. (Cf. Chess strategy§Control of the center.)

Another example is the Bear-in-the-hole castle. It was used during the Edo period and later lost popularity to the Mino castle. However, it was rediscovered and began to be used in the 20th century in Ranging Rook positions. And, later in the 1970s, the Bear-in-the-hole gained popularity in Static Rook positions as well, which continues into the 21st century.

The Snowroof opening was invented in the Edo period as well. It was popular in the first part of the 20th century but lost popularity after the 1940s and 1950s and was found only sporadically in professional games. However, recently, in 2017, the Snowroof has surged in popularity with professional players as a good strategy to combat opponents using Fortress strategies.

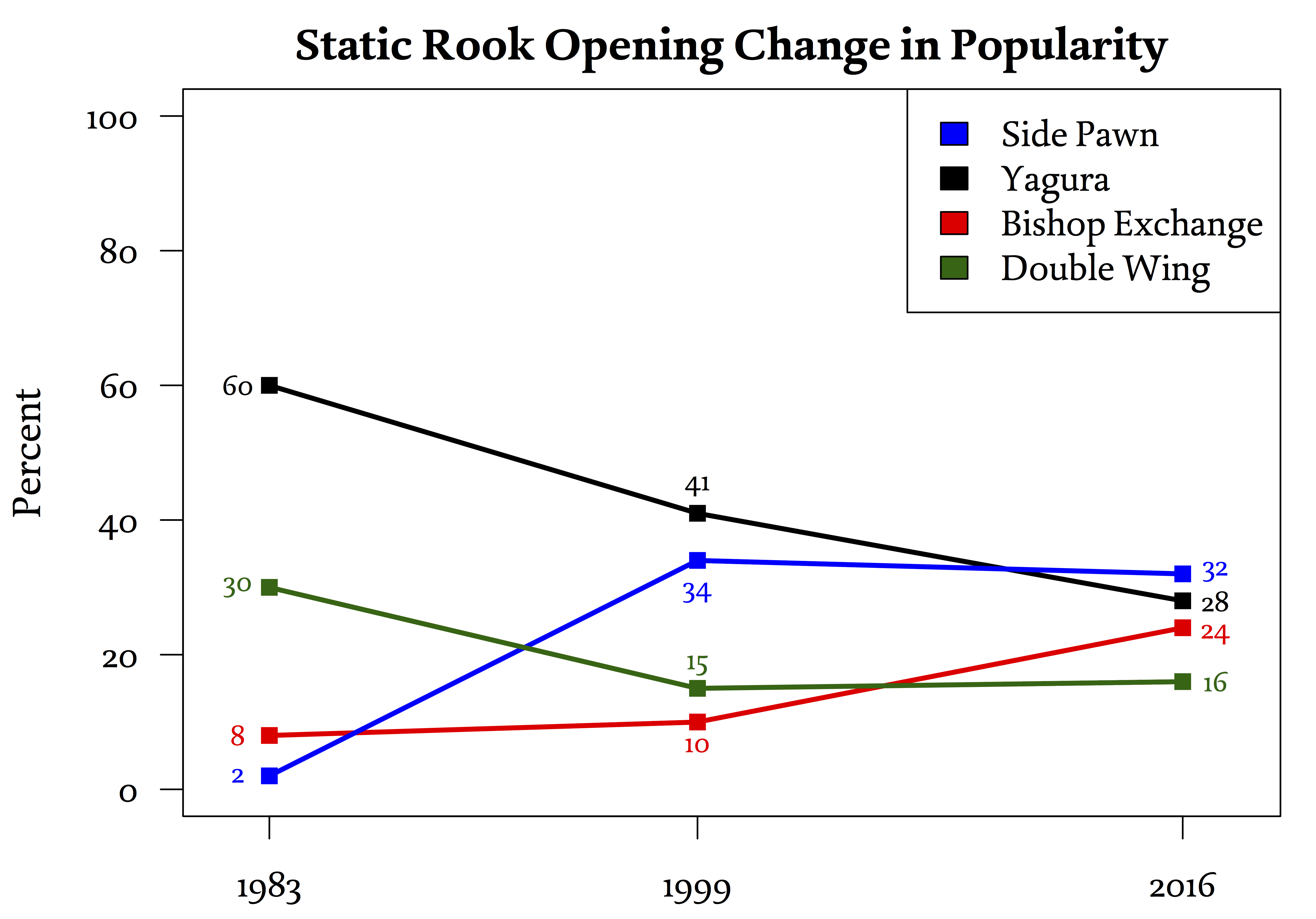
Change in popularity of Static Rook openings in professional games over a 34-year period (NHK Shogi Focus: April 16, 2016)

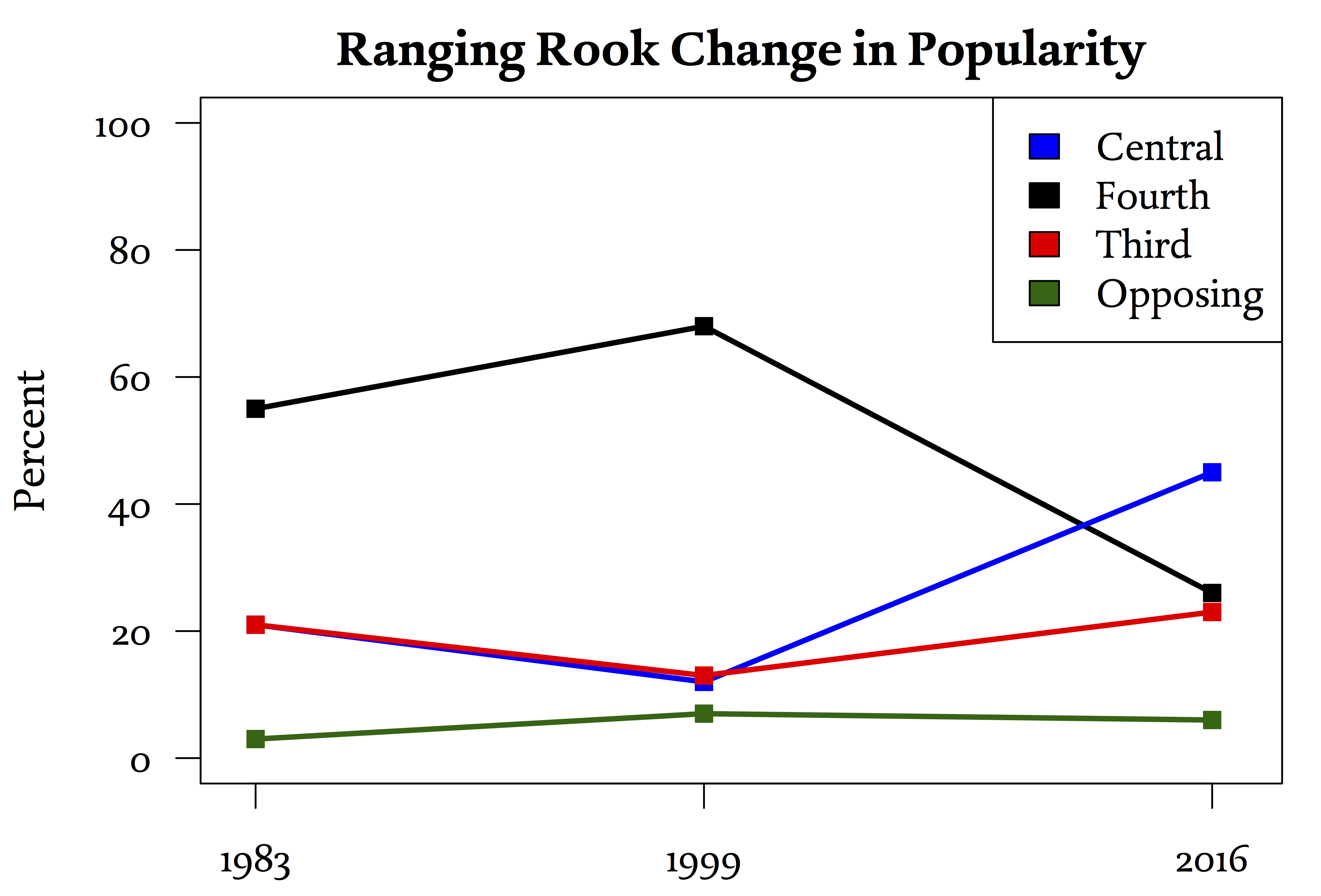
Change in popularity of Ranging Rook openings in professional games over a 34-year period (NHK Shogi Focus: April 16, 2016)

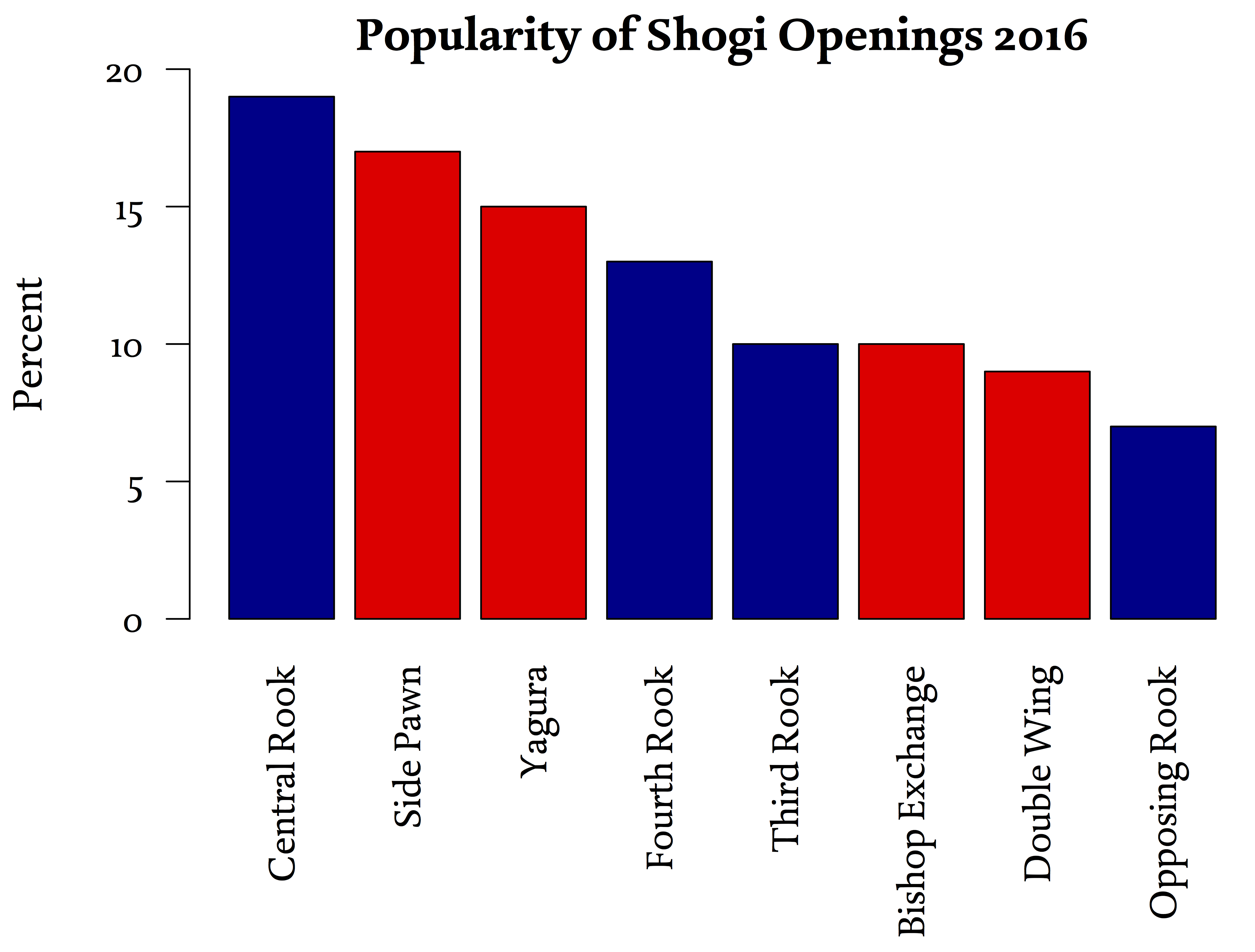
Percent of openings (Ranging Rook and Static Rook) used in professional games in 2016 (NHK Shogi Focus: April 16, 2016)

== Other openings ==
The list of openings presented above don't fit as well with the traditional classification. They include trap or surprise openings (奇襲戦法 kishū senpō) – such as Demon Slayer – and uncommon openings (such as the Ureshino opening). Others are somewhat harder to classify in the usual way by the position of the rook. For example, Twisting Rook is both a Static Rook and a Ranging Rook opening position while Right King exceptionally uses the rook as a defensive piece adjacent to the king flouting the general maxim that kings are castled away from rooks.

=== Right King ===
Bishop Exchange Right King
☖ pieces in hand: –

| 9 | 8 | 7 | 6 | 5 | 4 | 3 | 2 | 1 |
| | | | | | | | | | 1 |
| | | | | | | | | | 2 |
| | | | | | | | | | 3 |
| | | | | | | | | | 4 |
| | | | | | | | 歩 | | 5 |
| 歩 | | 歩 | | 歩 | 歩 | 歩 | | 歩 | 6 |
| | 歩 | | 歩 | 銀 | 銀 | 桂 | | | 7 |
| | | 金 | | 金 | | 玉 | | | 8 |
| 香 | 桂 | | | | | | 飛 | 香 | 9 |

☗ pieces in hand: 角

Right King (右玉 migi gyoku) is a defensive opening in which the king stays on the right side of board along with rook, which protects the last rank 9 as well as the eighth file. It is an exception to the general rule that the king is castled away from the rook.

It is possible to use a Right King formation within a Bishop Exchange opening as well as other openings.

=== Twisting Rook ===
Twisting Rook
☖ pieces in hand: 歩

| 9 | 8 | 7 | 6 | 5 | 4 | 3 | 2 | 1 |
| 香 | 桂 | | 金 | | 王 | | 桂 | 香 | 1 |
| | 飛 | | | | 銀 | | 角 | | 2 |
| 歩 | | 歩 | 銀 | 歩 | 歩 | 金 | 歩 | | 3 |
| | | | 歩 | | | 歩 | | 歩 | 4 |
| | 歩 | 歩 | | | | | | | 5 |
| 歩 | | 飛 | | | | | | 歩 | 6 |
| 角 | | 桂 | 歩 | 歩 | 歩 | 歩 | | | 7 |
| | | 金 | | | 玉 | 銀 | | | 8 |
| 香 | | 銀 | | | 金 | | 桂 | 香 | 9 |

☗ pieces in hand: 歩

Twisting Rook (ひねり飛車 hineribisha) or Rook On Pawn (縦歩取り tate fudori) is characterized by first playing a Static Rook opening that then switches to a Ranging Rook strategy with the rook positioned in front of one's camp. Since the starting Static Rook opening is Double Wing Attack, it is usually considered a variation of Double Wing Attack.

=== Wrong Diagonal Bishop ===
Wrong Diagonal Bishop
☖ pieces in hand: 角

| 9 | 8 | 7 | 6 | 5 | 4 | 3 | 2 | 1 |
| 香 | 桂 | 銀 | 金 | 王 | 金 | | 桂 | 香 | 1 |
| | 飛 | | | | | | 銀 | | 2 |
| 歩 | 歩 | 歩 | 歩 | 歩 | 歩 | | 歩 | 歩 | 3 |
| | | | | | | 歩 | | | 4 |
| | | | | | 角 | | | | 5 |
| | | 歩 | | | | | | | 6 |
| 歩 | 歩 | | 歩 | 歩 | 歩 | 歩 | 歩 | 歩 | 7 |
| | | | | | | | 飛 | | 8 |
| 香 | 桂 | 銀 | 金 | 玉 | 金 | 銀 | 桂 | 香 | 9 |

☗ pieces in hand: –

Wrong Diagonal Bishop (筋違い角 sujichigai kaku) is characterized by an early bishop exchange followed by dropping the bishop in hand on the 45 square if played by Black or the 65 square if played by White. The Wrong Diagonal Bishop player has the options of playing a Ranging Rook or a Static Rook position.

=== Bishop Head Pawn ===
Bishop Head Pawn
☖ pieces in hand: –

| 9 | 8 | 7 | 6 | 5 | 4 | 3 | 2 | 1 |
| 香 | 桂 | 銀 | 金 | 王 | 金 | 銀 | 桂 | 香 | 1 |
| | 飛 | | | | | | 角 | | 2 |
| 歩 | 歩 | 歩 | 歩 | 歩 | 歩 | | | 歩 | 3 |
| | | | | | | 歩 | 歩 | | 4 |
| | | | | | | | | | 5 |
| | | 歩 | | | | | 歩 | | 6 |
| 歩 | 歩 | | 歩 | 歩 | 歩 | 歩 | | 歩 | 7 |
| | 角 | | | | | | 飛 | | 8 |
| 香 | 桂 | 銀 | 金 | 玉 | 金 | 銀 | 桂 | 香 | 9 |

☗ pieces in hand: –

Bishop Head Pawn or Bishop's Head Pawn Push (角頭歩 kakutōfu or 角頭歩突き kakutō fuzuki) is characterized by advancing the bishop's head pawn on 87 to 86 early in the game, in which it is undefended.

=== Pinwheel ===
Pinwheel
☖ pieces in hand: –

| 9 | 8 | 7 | 6 | 5 | 4 | 3 | 2 | 1 |
| | | | | | | | | | 1 |
| | | | | | | | | | 2 |
| | | | | | | | | | 3 |
| | | | | | | | | | 4 |
| | | | 歩 | | 桂 | | | | 5 |
| 歩 | | 歩 | | 歩 | 歩 | 歩 | | 歩 | 6 |
| | 歩 | 桂 | 銀 | | 銀 | | | | 7 |
| | | 金 | | 金 | 玉 | | | | 8 |
| 香 | | | | | | | 飛 | 香 | 9 |

☗ pieces in hand: 角

Pinwheel (風車 kazaguruma) is an opening with the rook on the bottom rank 9 (or rank 1 if played by White) enabling it to switch between a Ranging Rook and Static Rook attack.

The pinwheel name comes from the way the king is able to rotate around the gold positioned on the 58 square as if it were a wheel.

=== First File Rook ===
First File Rook
☖ pieces in hand: –

| 9 | 8 | 7 | 6 | 5 | 4 | 3 | 2 | 1 |
| 香 | 桂 | 銀 | 金 | 王 | 金 | 銀 | 桂 | 香 | 1 |
| | 飛 | | | | | | 角 | | 2 |
| 歩 | | 歩 | 歩 | 歩 | 歩 | | 歩 | 歩 | 3 |
| | | | | | | 歩 | | | 4 |
| | 歩 | | | | | | | 歩 | 5 |
| | | | | | | | | 飛 | 6 |
| 歩 | 歩 | 歩 | 歩 | 歩 | 歩 | 歩 | 歩 | | 7 |
| | 角 | | | | | | | | 8 |
| 香 | 桂 | 銀 | 金 | 玉 | 金 | 銀 | 桂 | 香 | 9 |

☗ pieces in hand: –

First File Rook (一間飛車 ikkenbisha or ichigenbisha) is a surprise Static Rook opening in which the player's rook supports an attack on the player's rightmost edge file.

=== Buoyant Rook ===
Buoyant Rook
☖ pieces in hand: –

| 9 | 8 | 7 | 6 | 5 | 4 | 3 | 2 | 1 |
| 香 | 桂 | 銀 | 金 | 王 | 金 | 銀 | 桂 | 香 | 1 |
| | 飛 | | | | | | | | 2 |
| 歩 | 歩 | 歩 | 歩 | 歩 | 歩 | 角 | 歩 | 歩 | 3 |
| | | | | | | 歩 | | | 4 |
| | | | | | | | 歩 | | 5 |
| | | | | | | | 飛 | | 6 |
| 歩 | 歩 | 歩 | 歩 | 歩 | 歩 | 歩 | | 歩 | 7 |
| | 角 | | | | | | | | 8 |
| 香 | 桂 | 銀 | 金 | 玉 | 金 | 銀 | 桂 | 香 | 9 |

☗ pieces in hand: –

Buoyant Rook (浮き浮き飛車 ukiukibisha) is a surprise Static Rook opening in which the player's rook is advanced to the file directly above their line of pawns (rank 6 for Black or rank 4 for White).

=== Pac-Man ===
Pac-Man
☖ pieces in hand: –

| 9 | 8 | 7 | 6 | 5 | 4 | 3 | 2 | 1 |
| 香 | 桂 | 銀 | 金 | 王 | 金 | 銀 | 桂 | 香 | 1 |
| | 飛 | | | | | | 角 | | 2 |
| 歩 | 歩 | 歩 | 歩 | 歩 | | 歩 | 歩 | 歩 | 3 |
| | | | | | 歩 | | | | 4 |
| | | | | | | | | | 5 |
| | | 歩 | | | | | | | 6 |
| 歩 | 歩 | | 歩 | 歩 | 歩 | 歩 | 歩 | 歩 | 7 |
| | 角 | | | | | | 飛 | | 8 |
| 香 | 桂 | 銀 | 金 | 玉 | 金 | 銀 | 桂 | 香 | 9 |

☗ pieces in hand: –

Pac-Man (パックマン pakkuman or 四歩パックマン yon fu pakkuman) is a trap opening.

It is named after the video game Pac-Man. The opening has an early pawn gambit made by White on the fourth file which may be metaphorically eaten as if by Pac-Man. If Black takes the pawn with their bishop, then White will play a Fourth File Rook position. In this case, if Black plays without careful thought, then White's trap may succeed.

=== Demon Slayer ===
Demon Slayer
☖ pieces in hand: –

| 9 | 8 | 7 | 6 | 5 | 4 | 3 | 2 | 1 |
| 香 | 桂 | | 金 | 王 | 金 | 銀 | 桂 | 香 | 1 |
| | 飛 | | 銀 | | | | 角 | | 2 |
| 歩 | | 歩 | 歩 | 歩 | 歩 | | 歩 | 歩 | 3 |
| | 歩 | | | | | 歩 | | | 4 |
| | | 歩 | 桂 | | | | | | 5 |
| | | | | | | | | | 6 |
| 歩 | 歩 | | 歩 | 歩 | 歩 | 歩 | 歩 | 歩 | 7 |
| | 角 | | | | | | 飛 | | 8 |
| 香 | | 銀 | 金 | 玉 | 金 | 銀 | 桂 | 香 | 9 |

☗ pieces in hand: –

Demon Slayer (鬼殺し onigoroshi) is a trap opening sequence initiated by Black that characteristically advances their left knight blocking their bishop. Later moves attempt an attack using a further advanced knight and also possibly White's left silver.

There is also a variant known as New Demon Slayer (新鬼殺し shin onigoroshi).

=== Ureshino ===
Ureshino
☖ pieces in hand: –

| 9 | 8 | 7 | 6 | 5 | 4 | 3 | 2 | 1 |
| 香 | 桂 | 銀 | 金 | 王 | 金 | 銀 | 桂 | 香 | 1 |
| | 飛 | | | | | | 角 | | 2 |
| 歩 | | 歩 | 歩 | 歩 | 歩 | | 歩 | 歩 | 3 |
| | | | | | | 歩 | | | 4 |
| | 歩 | | | | | | | | 5 |
| | | | | | | | | | 6 |
| 歩 | 歩 | 歩 | 歩 | 歩 | 歩 | 歩 | 歩 | 歩 | 7 |
| | | 金 | 銀 | | 銀 | | 飛 | | 8 |
| 香 | 桂 | 角 | | 玉 | 金 | | 桂 | 香 | 9 |

☗ pieces in hand: –

The Ureshino (嬉野流 ureshino-ryū) opening is a newer aggressive Static Rook opening characterized by moving the right silver to the sixth file and then pulling back the bishop to the silver's start position.

It has an element of surprise as the move sequences are nonstandard and not found in professional play.

=== Lady Killer Wham-Bam Rook ===
Lady Killer Wham-Bam Rook
☖ pieces in hand: –

| 9 | 8 | 7 | 6 | 5 | 4 | 3 | 2 | 1 |
| 香 | 桂 | | 金 | | 金 | 銀 | 桂 | 香 | 1 |
| | 飛 | | 銀 | | | 王 | 角 | | 2 |
| 歩 | | 歩 | 歩 | 歩 | 歩 | | 歩 | 歩 | 3 |
| | | | | | | 歩 | | | 4 |
| | 歩 | | | | | | | | 5 |
| | | 歩 | | | | | | | 6 |
| 歩 | 歩 | | 歩 | 歩 | 歩 | 歩 | 歩 | 歩 | 7 |
| | 角 | | | 飛 | 銀 | 金 | 玉 | | 8 |
| 香 | 桂 | 金 | 銀 | | | | 桂 | 香 | 9 |

☗ pieces in hand: –

The Lady Killer Wham-Bam Rook (女殺しドッカン飛車 onna koroshi dokkan hisha) is a Ranging Rook surprise opening that was used by pornographer Oniroku Dan.

=== Tonari ===
The Tonari opening (都成流 tonari-ryū) is a new Ranging Rook surprise opening that was invented by professional Ryuuma Tonari.

It was presented on the 囲碁・将棋チャンネル (Go/Shogi Channel) by professional player Tetsurō Itodani.

== Identification by initial moves ==
Although it is more common for Japanese theory to categorize openings by their shape rather than move sequences, it is nonetheless also possible to identify specific openings based upon initial move sequences in a way reminiscent to the way western chess openings are classified. (Cf. Encyclopaedia of Chess Openings.)

Below are common four-move sequences associated with common openings as presented by Kōji Tanigawa on the NHK television program Shōgi Kōza (NHK将棋講座) in April 2006 and organized by the position of Black.

=== Black's rook pawn push ☗P-26 ===
☗P-26
☖ pieces in hand: –

| 9 | 8 | 7 | 6 | 5 | 4 | 3 | 2 | 1 |
| | | | | | | | | | 1 |
| | | | | | | | | | 2 |
| | | | | | | | | | 3 |
| | | | | | | | | | 4 |
| | | | | | | | | | 5 |
| | | | | | | | 歩 | | 6 |
| 歩 | 歩 | 歩 | 歩 | 歩 | 歩 | 歩 | | 歩 | 7 |
| | 角 | | | | | | 飛 | | 8 |
| 香 | 桂 | 銀 | 金 | 玉 | 金 | 銀 | 桂 | 香 | 9 |

☗ pieces in hand: –

By advancing their rook pawn (1. ☗P-26) in the first four moves, Black reveals very early their intention to play a Static Rook position. Although this move obviously gives White more information about Black's strategy, it also does limit both players' future moves in a way that opening the bishop diagonal (that is, 1. ☗P-76) on the first move does not. (For instance, the 1... R-32 opening and Quick Ishida are not possible for White if Black pushes their rook pawn first.) At the same time, not opening the bishop diagonal also adds some other possibilities which rely on a closed diagonal such as the Iijima Bishop Pullback opening or the Ureshino opening.

However, a Feint Ranging Rook position is still possible where this rook pawn push is the feint that tries to convince White that they will be playing against a Static Rook position after which Black moves their rook leftward to form a Ranging Rook position instead. The advantage is that if White develops certain structures to attack or defend against a Static Rook opponent they may not be as effective against Ranging Rook opponents. Although Feint Ranging Rook has occurred in professional games, it is uncommon.

☗P-26 ☗P-25
☖ pieces in hand: –

| 9 | 8 | 7 | 6 | 5 | 4 | 3 | 2 | 1 |
| | | | | | | | | | 1 |
| | | | | | | | | | 2 |
| | | | | | | | | | 3 |
| | | | | | | | | | 4 |
| | | | | | | | 歩 | | 5 |
| | | | | | | | | | 6 |
| 歩 | 歩 | 歩 | 歩 | 歩 | 歩 | 歩 | | 歩 | 7 |
| | 角 | | | | | | 飛 | | 8 |
| 香 | 桂 | 銀 | 金 | 玉 | 金 | 銀 | 桂 | 香 | 9 |

☗ pieces in hand: –
☗P-26 ☗P-76
☖ pieces in hand: –

| 9 | 8 | 7 | 6 | 5 | 4 | 3 | 2 | 1 |
| | | | | | | | | | 1 |
| | | | | | | | | | 2 |
| | | | | | | | | | 3 |
| | | | | | | | | | 4 |
| | | | | | | | | | 5 |
| | | 歩 | | | | | 歩 | | 6 |
| 歩 | 歩 | | 歩 | 歩 | 歩 | 歩 | | 歩 | 7 |
| | 角 | | | | | | 飛 | | 8 |
| 香 | 桂 | 銀 | 金 | 玉 | 金 | 銀 | 桂 | 香 | 9 |

☗ pieces in hand: –

An initial rook pawn push could either be pushed further (2. ☗P-25) or combined with activating their bishop by opening its diagonal (2. ☗P-76).

==== ☗P-26, ☗P-25 ====
Double Wing Attack
☖ pieces in hand: –

| 9 | 8 | 7 | 6 | 5 | 4 | 3 | 2 | 1 |
| 香 | 桂 | 銀 | 金 | 王 | 金 | 銀 | 桂 | 香 | 1 |
| | 飛 | | | | | | 角 | | 2 |
| 歩 | | 歩 | 歩 | 歩 | 歩 | 歩 | 歩 | 歩 | 3 |
| | | | | | | | | | 4 |
| | 歩 | | | | | | 歩 | | 5 |
| | | | | | | | | | 6 |
| 歩 | 歩 | 歩 | 歩 | 歩 | 歩 | 歩 | | 歩 | 7 |
| | 角 | | | | | | 飛 | | 8 |
| 香 | 桂 | 銀 | 金 | 玉 | 金 | 銀 | 桂 | 香 | 9 |

☗ pieces in hand: –
1. ☗P-26 ☖P-84
2. ☗P-25 ☖P-85

1. P-26 P-84 2. P-25 P-85. Looking at Black's position with two pushes of the rook pawn, the most common way this is used is when Black first pushes their rook pawn (1. P-26) which is answered by White doing the same (1...P-84) leading to a Double Static Rook game. From here, a natural way to play is for Black to push their pawn once more (2. P-25). Then, since White is under the threat of an attack on the second file, White is most likely to push their rook pawn again as well to give Black the same counterattacking threat (2...P-85).

This 4-move position usually leads to a Double Wing Attack opening with the subsequent moves: 3. G-78 G-32 4. P-24 Px24 5. Rx24 P*23 to be followed by either 6. R-26 or 6. R-28. Note that although this is the most common sequence leading to Double Wing, it is not the only way Double Wing openings can come about.

==== ☗P-26, ☗P-76 ====
Another set of openings with Black's rook pawn push also include opening the bishop diagonal in addition (☗P-26, ☗P-76). Although Black will be playing a Static Rook position, White has the freedom of responding to Black with either a Ranging Rook position or a Static Rook position.

===== 1. ☗P-26 ☖P-84 2. ☗P-76 ☖P-85 =====
Bishop Exchange
☖ pieces in hand: –

| 9 | 8 | 7 | 6 | 5 | 4 | 3 | 2 | 1 |
| 香 | 桂 | 銀 | 金 | 王 | 金 | 銀 | 桂 | 香 | 1 |
| | 飛 | | | | | | 角 | | 2 |
| 歩 | | 歩 | 歩 | 歩 | 歩 | 歩 | 歩 | 歩 | 3 |
| | | | | | | | | | 4 |
| | 歩 | | | | | | | | 5 |
| | | 歩 | | | | | 歩 | | 6 |
| 歩 | 歩 | | 歩 | 歩 | 歩 | 歩 | | 歩 | 7 |
| | 角 | | | | | | 飛 | | 8 |
| 香 | 桂 | 銀 | 金 | 玉 | 金 | 銀 | 桂 | 香 | 9 |

☗ pieces in hand: –
1. ☗P-76 ☖P-84
2. ☗P-26 ☖P-85

After Black's chooses Static Rook with 1. P-26, White can also push their rook pawn (1...P-84) for a Static Rook position leading to a Double Static Rook game. Then, Black also opens their bishop diagonal activating their bishop (2. P-76). This sequence could be transposed to a 1. P-76 P-84 2. P-26 sequence.

After this, White may push their rook pawn once more (2...P-85) threatening a pawn exchange on the eighth file. This 4-move sequence usually leads to a Bishop Exchange opening. One variation has the following moves: 3. B-77 P-34 4. S-88 preparing for 4...Bx77+. Another variation could include a rook pawn push by Black first: 3. P-25 G-32 4. B-77 P-34 5. S-88 again preparing for 5...Bx77+.

===== 1. ☗P-76 ☖P-34 2. ☗P-26 ☖P-84 =====
Besides pushing only their rook pawn, White can open their bishop diagonal during their first 2 moves as well leading to a greater range of opening possibilities.

Side Pawn Capture
☖ pieces in hand: –

| 9 | 8 | 7 | 6 | 5 | 4 | 3 | 2 | 1 |
| 香 | 桂 | 銀 | 金 | 王 | 金 | 銀 | 桂 | 香 | 1 |
| | 飛 | | | | | | 角 | | 2 |
| 歩 | | 歩 | 歩 | 歩 | 歩 | | 歩 | 歩 | 3 |
| | 歩 | | | | | 歩 | | | 4 |
| | | | | | | | | | 5 |
| | | 歩 | | | | | 歩 | | 6 |
| 歩 | 歩 | | 歩 | 歩 | 歩 | 歩 | | 歩 | 7 |
| | 角 | | | | | | 飛 | | 8 |
| 香 | 桂 | 銀 | 金 | 玉 | 金 | 銀 | 桂 | 香 | 9 |

☗ pieces in hand: –
1. ☗P-76 ☖P-34
2. ☗P-26 ☖P-84

Black's open bishop diagonal (1. P-76) is met with White's open bishop diagonal (1...P-34). Then, Black plays the most common move of choosing Static Rook (2. P-26). These three moves could also be transposed to 1. P-26 P-34 2. P-76. After this, White does the same rook pawn push (2...P-84) leading to a symmetrical Double Static Rook board. Another possible (but less common) transposition of the four moves could be 1. P-26 P-84 2. P-76 P-34.

This 4-move sequence will usually be followed by 3. P-25 P-85 4. G-78 G-32 5. P-24 Px24 6. Rx24, which is a sequence that often leads to the Side Pawn Capture opening (after 6...P-86 7.Px86 Rx86 8. Rx34). This opening is fairly sharp since both of the major pieces (rook and bishop) are being activated from the start before any castle construction is attempted. Although Side Pawn Capture is most common, a Double Wing Attack opening with mutually open bishop diagonals is another possibility.

===== 1. ☗P-76 ☖P-34 2. ☗P-26 ☖P-44 =====
Ranging Rook or
Double Static Rook
☖ pieces in hand: –

| 9 | 8 | 7 | 6 | 5 | 4 | 3 | 2 | 1 |
| 香 | 桂 | 銀 | 金 | 王 | 金 | 銀 | 桂 | 香 | 1 |
| | 飛 | | | | | | 角 | | 2 |
| 歩 | 歩 | 歩 | 歩 | 歩 | | | 歩 | 歩 | 3 |
| | | | | | 歩 | 歩 | | | 4 |
| | | | | | | | | | 5 |
| | | 歩 | | | | | 歩 | | 6 |
| 歩 | 歩 | | 歩 | 歩 | 歩 | 歩 | | 歩 | 7 |
| | 角 | | | | | | 飛 | | 8 |
| 香 | 桂 | 銀 | 金 | 玉 | 金 | 銀 | 桂 | 香 | 9 |

☗ pieces in hand: –
1. ☗P-76 ☖P-34
2. ☗P-26 ☖P-44

In this sequence (or transposition 1. P-26 P-34 2. P-76), after mutual open bishop diagonals and Black's Static Rook move, White opts to close their bishop diagonal (2...P-44). This move reduces the complexity of the opening by preventing both players from trading their bishop off the board.

After the diagonal is closed with this 4-move sequence, Black usually develops their right silver toward the center with 3. S-48. White's most likely set of responses is to play a Ranging Rook position by moving their rook leftward, such as with ...R-42 for Fourth File Rook, ...R-32 for Third File Rook or ...R-52 for Central Rook. And, whenever Black pushes their rook pawn again with P-25, the pawn trade on the second file will be prevented by White's bishop with ...B-33. If Black pushes the pawn early, then White may opt for yet another Ranging Rook position, Opposing Rook, by moving the rook to the second file with ...R-22 as the bishop will no longer be blocking the rook's movement to this square.

Examples after these first four moves include the following:

- Static Rook vs Fourth File Rook: 3. S-48 R-42 5. K-68
- Static Rook vs Fourth File Rook: 3. S-48 S-32 4. P-56 R-42
- Static Rook vs Third File Rook: 3. S-48 R-32 4. P-25 B-33
- Static Rook vs Central File Rook: 3. S-48 S-42 4. P-56 P-54 5. G49-58 R-52
- Static Rook vs Opposing File Rook: 3. P-25 B-33 4. S-48 R-22

However, White's position is also flexible enough to play a Static Rook formation such as Fortress by moving the silver up to ...S-42 so that a Fortress castle can be formed and preventing Black from trading off the second file pawn by moving the silver to the 33 square. For example:

- Static Rook vs Fortress: 3. S-48 S-42 4. P-25 S-33.

Yet another Static Rook possibility for White is for the silver on 42 to move up to 43 for a Snowroof opening where pawn exchange on the second file may be prevented by White moving their bishop to the 33 square (although White is not required to prevent the pawn exchange by leaving their bishop in its start position on 22).

===== 1. ☗P-76 ☖P-34 2. ☗P-26 ☖P-54 =====
Cheerful Central Rook
☖ pieces in hand: –

| 9 | 8 | 7 | 6 | 5 | 4 | 3 | 2 | 1 |
| 香 | 桂 | 銀 | 金 | 王 | 金 | 銀 | 桂 | 香 | 1 |
| | 飛 | | | | | | 角 | | 2 |
| 歩 | 歩 | 歩 | 歩 | | 歩 | | 歩 | 歩 | 3 |
| | | | | 歩 | | 歩 | | | 4 |
| | | | | | | | | | 5 |
| | | 歩 | | | | | 歩 | | 6 |
| 歩 | 歩 | | 歩 | 歩 | 歩 | 歩 | | 歩 | 7 |
| | 角 | | | | | | 飛 | | 8 |
| 香 | 桂 | 銀 | 金 | 玉 | 金 | 銀 | 桂 | 香 | 9 |

☗ pieces in hand: –
1. ☗P-76 ☖P-34
2. ☗P-26 ☖P-54

After open bishop diagonals for both players, another possible response to Black's pawn push (2. P-26) is for White to push their central pawn (2...P-54).

After this 4-move sequence, White aims to support this central pawn by swinging their rook to the central file. With both players' bishops fully activated, this particular Central Rook variation is Cheerful Central Rook. The opening continues with 3. P-25 R-52. After this, Black may develop a general (with 4. S-48 or 4. G49-58) or the king (with 4. K-68), and White will push their central pawn once again with 4...P-55 in order to convert it to a vanguard pawn. Of course, since the bishops are activated, a bishop trade variation with 4. Bx22+ Sx22 instead is also possible, which is known as the Maruyama Vaccine (丸山ワクチン maruyama wakuchin).

===== 1. ☗P-76 ☖P-34 2. ☗P-26 ☖G-32 =====
Tempo Loss Bishop Exchange
☖ pieces in hand: –

| 9 | 8 | 7 | 6 | 5 | 4 | 3 | 2 | 1 |
| 香 | 桂 | 銀 | 金 | 王 | | 銀 | 桂 | 香 | 1 |
| | 飛 | | | | | 金 | 角 | | 2 |
| 歩 | 歩 | 歩 | 歩 | 歩 | 歩 | | 歩 | 歩 | 3 |
| | | | | | | 歩 | | | 4 |
| | | | | | | | | | 5 |
| | | 歩 | | | | | 歩 | | 6 |
| 歩 | 歩 | | 歩 | 歩 | 歩 | 歩 | | 歩 | 7 |
| | 角 | | | | | | 飛 | | 8 |
| 香 | 桂 | 銀 | 金 | 玉 | 金 | 銀 | 桂 | 香 | 9 |

☗ pieces in hand: –
1. ☗P-76 ☖P-34
2. ☗P-26 ☖G-32

Another fourth move response to the same 3-move 1. P-76 P-34 2. P-26 sequence is for White to protect the second file with a gold (2...G-32). After this 4-move sequence, the opening is likely to be Tempo Loss Bishop Exchange with 3. P-25 Bx88+ 4. Sx88 S-22. The Tempo Loss Bishop Exchange opening has many similarities with the regular Bishop Exchange opening (shown above) – the important differences being a loss of one tempo for White and White's 85 square being unoccupied for a possible right knight jump later in the game (since White's rook pawn was not pushed early like in the regular Bishop Exchange).

=== Black's bishop pawn ☗P-76 (no ☗P-26) ===
☗P-76
☖ pieces in hand: –

| 9 | 8 | 7 | 6 | 5 | 4 | 3 | 2 | 1 |
| | | | | | | | | | 1 |
| | | | | | | | | | 2 |
| | | | | | | | | | 3 |
| | | | | | | | | | 4 |
| | | | | | | | | | 5 |
| | | 歩 | | | | | | | 6 |
| 歩 | 歩 | | 歩 | 歩 | 歩 | 歩 | 歩 | 歩 | 7 |
| | 角 | | | | | | 飛 | | 8 |
| 香 | 桂 | 銀 | 金 | 玉 | 金 | 銀 | 桂 | 香 | 9 |

☗ pieces in hand: –

There are several possible openings if Black does not push their rook pawn forward in the first four moves and instead focuses on activating their bishop (P-76) and developing other pieces. These include Ranging Rook openings as well as Static Rook openings where the rook pawn is delayed. Likewise, White can respond to Black's moves with either Static Rook or Ranging Rook positions.

☗P-76 ☗S-68
☖ pieces in hand: –

| 9 | 8 | 7 | 6 | 5 | 4 | 3 | 2 | 1 |
| | | | | | | | | | 1 |
| | | | | | | | | | 2 |
| | | | | | | | | | 3 |
| | | | | | | | | | 4 |
| | | | | | | | | | 5 |
| | | 歩 | | | | | | | 6 |
| 歩 | 歩 | | 歩 | 歩 | 歩 | 歩 | 歩 | 歩 | 7 |
| | 角 | | 銀 | | | | 飛 | | 8 |
| 香 | 桂 | | 金 | 玉 | 金 | 銀 | 桂 | 香 | 9 |

☗ pieces in hand: –
☗P-76 ☗R-68
☖ pieces in hand: –

| 9 | 8 | 7 | 6 | 5 | 4 | 3 | 2 | 1 |
| | | | | | | | | | 1 |
| | | | | | | | | | 2 |
| | | | | | | | | | 3 |
| | | | | | | | | | 4 |
| | | | | | | | | | 5 |
| | | 歩 | | | | | | | 6 |
| 歩 | 歩 | | 歩 | 歩 | 歩 | 歩 | 歩 | 歩 | 7 |
| | 角 | | 飛 | | | | | | 8 |
| 香 | 桂 | 銀 | 金 | 玉 | 金 | 銀 | 桂 | 香 | 9 |

☗ pieces in hand: –
☗P-76 ☗R-78
☖ pieces in hand: –

| 9 | 8 | 7 | 6 | 5 | 4 | 3 | 2 | 1 |
| | | | | | | | | | 1 |
| | | | | | | | | | 2 |
| | | | | | | | | | 3 |
| | | | | | | | | | 4 |
| | | | | | | | | | 5 |
| | | 歩 | | | | | | | 6 |
| 歩 | 歩 | | 歩 | 歩 | 歩 | 歩 | 歩 | 歩 | 7 |
| | 角 | 飛 | | | | | | | 8 |
| 香 | 桂 | 銀 | 金 | 玉 | 金 | 銀 | 桂 | 香 | 9 |

☗ pieces in hand: –
☗P-76 ☗P-56
☖ pieces in hand: –

| 9 | 8 | 7 | 6 | 5 | 4 | 3 | 2 | 1 |
| | | | | | | | | | 1 |
| | | | | | | | | | 2 |
| | | | | | | | | | 3 |
| | | | | | | | | | 4 |
| | | | | | | | | | 5 |
| | | 歩 | | 歩 | | | | | 6 |
| 歩 | 歩 | | 歩 | | 歩 | 歩 | 歩 | 歩 | 7 |
| | 角 | | | | | | 飛 | | 8 |
| 香 | 桂 | 銀 | 金 | 玉 | 金 | 銀 | 桂 | 香 | 9 |

☗ pieces in hand: –

☗P-76 ☗P-66
☖ pieces in hand: –

| 9 | 8 | 7 | 6 | 5 | 4 | 3 | 2 | 1 |
| | | | | | | | | | 1 |
| | | | | | | | | | 2 |
| | | | | | | | | | 3 |
| | | | | | | | | | 4 |
| | | | | | | | | | 5 |
| | | 歩 | 歩 | | | | | | 6 |
| 歩 | 歩 | | | 歩 | 歩 | 歩 | 歩 | 歩 | 7 |
| | 角 | | | | | | 飛 | | 8 |
| 香 | 桂 | 銀 | 金 | 玉 | 金 | 銀 | 桂 | 香 | 9 |

☗ pieces in hand: –
☗P-76 ☗P-75
☖ pieces in hand: –

| 9 | 8 | 7 | 6 | 5 | 4 | 3 | 2 | 1 |
| | | | | | | | | | 1 |
| | | | | | | | | | 2 |
| | | | | | | | | | 3 |
| | | | | | | | | | 4 |
| | | 歩 | | | | | | | 5 |
| | | | | | | | | | 6 |
| 歩 | 歩 | | 歩 | 歩 | 歩 | 歩 | 歩 | 歩 | 7 |
| | 角 | | | | | | 飛 | | 8 |
| 香 | 桂 | 銀 | 金 | 玉 | 金 | 銀 | 桂 | 香 | 9 |

☗ pieces in hand: –
☗P-76 ☗P-16
☖ pieces in hand: –

| 9 | 8 | 7 | 6 | 5 | 4 | 3 | 2 | 1 |
| | | | | | | | | | 1 |
| | | | | | | | | | 2 |
| | | | | | | | | | 3 |
| | | | | | | | | | 4 |
| | | | | | | | | | 5 |
| | | 歩 | | | | | | 歩 | 6 |
| 歩 | 歩 | | 歩 | 歩 | 歩 | 歩 | 歩 | | 7 |
| | 角 | | | | | | 飛 | | 8 |
| 香 | 桂 | 銀 | 金 | 玉 | 金 | 銀 | 桂 | 香 | 9 |

☗ pieces in hand: –

Thus, the world of possibilities include Double Static Rook, Static Rook vs Ranging Rook, Ranging Rook vs Static Rook, and Double Ranging Rook games.

==== ☗P-76, ☗S-68 ====
===== 1. ☗P-76 ☖P-84 2. ☗S-68 ☖P-34 =====
Double Fortress
☖ pieces in hand: –

| 9 | 8 | 7 | 6 | 5 | 4 | 3 | 2 | 1 |
| 香 | 桂 | 銀 | 金 | 王 | 金 | 銀 | 桂 | 香 | 1 |
| | 飛 | | | | | | 角 | | 2 |
| 歩 | | 歩 | 歩 | 歩 | 歩 | | 歩 | 歩 | 3 |
| | 歩 | | | | | 歩 | | | 4 |
| | | | | | | | | | 5 |
| | | 歩 | | | | | | | 6 |
| 歩 | 歩 | | 歩 | 歩 | 歩 | 歩 | 歩 | 歩 | 7 |
| | 角 | | 銀 | | | | 飛 | | 8 |
| 香 | 桂 | | 金 | 玉 | 金 | 銀 | 桂 | 香 | 9 |

☗ pieces in hand: –
1. ☗P-76 ☖P-84
2. ☗S-68 ☖P-34

After Black opens their bishop diagonal (1. P-76), White plays Static Rook (1...P-84). Then, in order to defend the eighth file so that White cannot trade off their rook pawn, White develops their silver (2. S-68) so that it may reach the 77 square should White push their rook pawn again to the 85 square (which otherwise would aim for P-86 Px86 Rx86). Since Black's bishop is now undefended, White activates their bishop (2...P-34). For this reason, this 4-move sequence cannot transpose to 1. P-76 P-34 2. S-68 P-84 (or 1. S-68 P-34 2. P-76) because after 1. P-76 P-34 2. S-68 Black's bishop would be captured for free.

This leads to the very common Fortress opening, which is often (but not always) a Double Fortress opening. There are two common developments following this:

- 3. P-66 S-62 4. P-56
- 3. S-77 S-62 4. P-26

The 3. S-77 variation is very clearly Fortress since the Fortress castle is formed with the characteristic silver on the 77 square. The 3. P-66 variation, although a very common sequence for Fortress, is also flexible enough to transition to a Ranging Rook opening like Fourth File Rook (for example, 3. P-66 S-62 4. S-67 P-54 5. R-68) or the less common Static Rook opening, Snowroof.

==== ☗P-76, ☗R-68/78 ====
Black's open bishop diagonal can be combined with an early Ranging Rook movement to play Third File Rook or Fourth File Rook. (Central Rook is also possible but less common.)

===== 1. ☗P-76 ☖P-84 2. ☗R-78 ☖P-34 =====
Third File Rook
☖ pieces in hand: –

| 9 | 8 | 7 | 6 | 5 | 4 | 3 | 2 | 1 |
| 香 | 桂 | 銀 | 金 | 王 | 金 | 銀 | 桂 | 香 | 1 |
| | 飛 | | | | | | 角 | | 2 |
| 歩 | | 歩 | 歩 | 歩 | 歩 | | 歩 | 歩 | 3 |
| | 歩 | | | | | 歩 | | | 4 |
| | | | | | | | | | 5 |
| | | 歩 | | | | | | | 6 |
| 歩 | 歩 | | 歩 | 歩 | 歩 | 歩 | 歩 | 歩 | 7 |
| | 角 | 飛 | | | | | | | 8 |
| 香 | 桂 | 銀 | 金 | 玉 | 金 | 銀 | 桂 | 香 | 9 |

☗ pieces in hand: –
1. ☗P-76 ☖P-84
2. ☗R-78 ☖P-34

After Black's open bishop diagonal (1. P-76) and White's Static Rook (1...P-84), Black swings their rook over to the seventh file (2. R-78) to play Black's variation of Third File Rook. Then, White opens their bishop diagonal as well (2...P-34) threatening to exchange the bishops off the board.

After this 4-move sequence, the opening is Black's Normal Third File vs Static Rook continuing with 3. P-66 P-84 4. B-77.

Note that this sequence usually does not transpose to 1. P-76 P-34 2. R-78 P-84. If Black moves their rook with mutually open bishop diagonals (1. P-76 P-34 2. R-78), it leads to a sharp variation starting with a bishop trade with 2...Bx88+ 3. Sx88 B*45.

===== 1. ☗P-76 ☖P-34 2. ☗R-68 ☖P-84 =====
Fourth File Rook
☖ pieces in hand: –

| 9 | 8 | 7 | 6 | 5 | 4 | 3 | 2 | 1 |
| 香 | 桂 | 銀 | 金 | 王 | 金 | 銀 | 桂 | 香 | 1 |
| | 飛 | | | | | | 角 | | 2 |
| 歩 | | 歩 | 歩 | 歩 | 歩 | | 歩 | 歩 | 3 |
| | 歩 | | | | | 歩 | | | 4 |
| | | | | | | | | | 5 |
| | | 歩 | | | | | | | 6 |
| 歩 | 歩 | | 歩 | 歩 | 歩 | 歩 | 歩 | 歩 | 7 |
| | 角 | | 飛 | | | | | | 8 |
| 香 | 桂 | 銀 | 金 | 玉 | 金 | 銀 | 桂 | 香 | 9 |

☗ pieces in hand: –
1. ☗P-76 ☖P-34
2. ☗R-68 ☖P-84

This may transpose to 1. P-76 P-84 2. R-68 P-34. Transpositions of 1. R-68 P-84 2. P-76 P-34 and 1. R-68 P-34 2. P-76 P-84 are also possible but very uncommon since other minor variations may follow 1. R-68 P-34.

==== ☗P-76, ☗P-56 ====
===== 1. ☗P-76 ☖P-84 2. ☗P-56 ☖P-85 =====
Cheerful Central Rook or
Opposing Rook
☖ pieces in hand: –

| 9 | 8 | 7 | 6 | 5 | 4 | 3 | 2 | 1 |
| 香 | 桂 | 銀 | 金 | 王 | 金 | 銀 | 桂 | 香 | 1 |
| | 飛 | | | | | | 角 | | 2 |
| 歩 | | 歩 | 歩 | 歩 | 歩 | 歩 | 歩 | 歩 | 3 |
| | | | | | | | | | 4 |
| | 歩 | | | | | | | | 5 |
| | | 歩 | | 歩 | | | | | 6 |
| 歩 | 歩 | | 歩 | | 歩 | 歩 | 歩 | 歩 | 7 |
| | 角 | | | | | | 飛 | | 8 |
| 香 | 桂 | 銀 | 金 | 玉 | 金 | 銀 | 桂 | 香 | 9 |

☗ pieces in hand: –
1. ☗P-76 ☖P-84
2. ☗P-56 ☖P-85

==== ☗P-76, ☗P-66 ====
Ranging Rook or
Double Static Rook
☖ pieces in hand: –

| 9 | 8 | 7 | 6 | 5 | 4 | 3 | 2 | 1 |
| 香 | 桂 | 銀 | 金 | 王 | 金 | 銀 | 桂 | 香 | 1 |
| | 飛 | | | | | | 角 | | 2 |
| 歩 | | 歩 | 歩 | 歩 | 歩 | | 歩 | 歩 | 3 |
| | 歩 | | | | | 歩 | | | 4 |
| | | | | | | | | | 5 |
| | | 歩 | 歩 | | | | | | 6 |
| 歩 | 歩 | | | 歩 | 歩 | 歩 | 歩 | 歩 | 7 |
| | 角 | | | | | | 飛 | | 8 |
| 香 | 桂 | 銀 | 金 | 玉 | 金 | 銀 | 桂 | 香 | 9 |

☗ pieces in hand: –
1. ☗P-76 ☖P-34
2. ☗P-66 ☖P-84
Ranging Rook or
Double Static Rook
☖ pieces in hand: –

| 9 | 8 | 7 | 6 | 5 | 4 | 3 | 2 | 1 |
| 香 | 桂 | | 金 | 王 | 金 | 銀 | 桂 | 香 | 1 |
| | 飛 | | 銀 | | | | 角 | | 2 |
| 歩 | 歩 | 歩 | 歩 | 歩 | 歩 | | 歩 | 歩 | 3 |
| | | | | | | 歩 | | | 4 |
| | | | | | | | | | 5 |
| | | 歩 | 歩 | | | | | | 6 |
| 歩 | 歩 | | | 歩 | 歩 | 歩 | 歩 | 歩 | 7 |
| | 角 | | | | | | 飛 | | 8 |
| 香 | 桂 | 銀 | 金 | 玉 | 金 | 銀 | 桂 | 香 | 9 |

☗ pieces in hand: –
1. ☗P-76 ☖P-34
2. ☗P-66 ☖S-62

Double Ranging Rook or Ranging Rook
☖ pieces in hand: –

| 9 | 8 | 7 | 6 | 5 | 4 | 3 | 2 | 1 |
| 香 | 桂 | 銀 | 金 | 王 | 金 | 銀 | 桂 | 香 | 1 |
| | | | | | | 飛 | 角 | | 2 |
| 歩 | 歩 | 歩 | 歩 | 歩 | 歩 | | 歩 | 歩 | 3 |
| | | | | | | 歩 | | | 4 |
| | | | | | | | | | 5 |
| | | 歩 | 歩 | | | | | | 6 |
| 歩 | 歩 | | | 歩 | 歩 | 歩 | 歩 | 歩 | 7 |
| | 角 | | | | | | 飛 | | 8 |
| 香 | 桂 | 銀 | 金 | 玉 | 金 | 銀 | 桂 | 香 | 9 |

☗ pieces in hand: –
1. ☗P-76 ☖P-34
2. ☗P-66 ☖R-32
Double Ranging Rook or Ranging Rook
☖ pieces in hand: –

| 9 | 8 | 7 | 6 | 5 | 4 | 3 | 2 | 1 |
| 香 | 桂 | 銀 | 金 | 王 | 金 | 銀 | 桂 | 香 | 1 |
| | 飛 | | | | | | | | 2 |
| 歩 | 歩 | 歩 | 歩 | 歩 | 歩 | 角 | 歩 | 歩 | 3 |
| | | | | | | 歩 | | | 4 |
| | | | | | | | | | 5 |
| | | 歩 | 歩 | | | | | | 6 |
| 歩 | 歩 | | | 歩 | 歩 | 歩 | 歩 | 歩 | 7 |
| | 角 | | | | | | 飛 | | 8 |
| 香 | 桂 | 銀 | 金 | 玉 | 金 | 銀 | 桂 | 香 | 9 |

☗ pieces in hand: –
1. ☗P-76 ☖P-34
2. ☗P-66 ☖B-33

Double Ranging Rook or Ranging Rook
☖ pieces in hand: –

| 9 | 8 | 7 | 6 | 5 | 4 | 3 | 2 | 1 |
| 香 | 桂 | 銀 | 金 | 王 | 金 | 銀 | 桂 | 香 | 1 |
| | 飛 | | | | | | 角 | | 2 |
| 歩 | 歩 | 歩 | 歩 | | 歩 | | 歩 | 歩 | 3 |
| | | | | 歩 | | 歩 | | | 4 |
| | | | | | | | | | 5 |
| | | 歩 | 歩 | | | | | | 6 |
| 歩 | 歩 | | | 歩 | 歩 | 歩 | 歩 | 歩 | 7 |
| | 角 | | | | | | 飛 | | 8 |
| 香 | 桂 | 銀 | 金 | 玉 | 金 | 銀 | 桂 | 香 | 9 |

☗ pieces in hand: –
1. ☗P-76 ☖P-34
2. ☗P-66 ☖P-54
Double Ranging Rook or Ranging Rook
☖ pieces in hand: –

| 9 | 8 | 7 | 6 | 5 | 4 | 3 | 2 | 1 |
| 香 | 桂 | 銀 | 金 | 王 | 金 | | 桂 | 香 | 1 |
| | 飛 | | | | | 銀 | 角 | | 2 |
| 歩 | 歩 | 歩 | 歩 | 歩 | 歩 | | 歩 | 歩 | 3 |
| | | | | | | 歩 | | | 4 |
| | | | | | | | | | 5 |
| | | 歩 | 歩 | | | | | | 6 |
| 歩 | 歩 | | | 歩 | 歩 | 歩 | 歩 | 歩 | 7 |
| | 角 | | | | | | 飛 | | 8 |
| 香 | 桂 | 銀 | 金 | 玉 | 金 | 銀 | 桂 | 香 | 9 |

☗ pieces in hand: –
1. ☗P-76 ☖P-34
2. ☗P-66 ☖S-32

==== ☗P-76, ☗P-75 ====
Quick Ishida
☖ pieces in hand: –

| 9 | 8 | 7 | 6 | 5 | 4 | 3 | 2 | 1 |
| 香 | 桂 | 銀 | 金 | 王 | 金 | 銀 | 桂 | 香 | 1 |
| | 飛 | | | | | | 角 | | 2 |
| 歩 | | 歩 | 歩 | 歩 | 歩 | | 歩 | 歩 | 3 |
| | 歩 | | | | | 歩 | | | 4 |
| | | 歩 | | | | | | | 5 |
| | | | | | | | | | 6 |
| 歩 | 歩 | | 歩 | 歩 | 歩 | 歩 | 歩 | 歩 | 7 |
| | 角 | | | | | | 飛 | | 8 |
| 香 | 桂 | 銀 | 金 | 玉 | 金 | 銀 | 桂 | 香 | 9 |

☗ pieces in hand: –
1. ☗P-76 ☖P-34
2. ☗P-75 ☖P-84

==== ☗P-76, ☗P-16 ====
===== ☗1. P-76 ☖P-34 2. ☗P-16 ☖P-84 =====
Noncommittal
☖ pieces in hand: –

| 9 | 8 | 7 | 6 | 5 | 4 | 3 | 2 | 1 |
| 香 | 桂 | 銀 | 金 | 王 | 金 | 銀 | 桂 | 香 | 1 |
| | 飛 | | | | | | 角 | | 2 |
| 歩 | | 歩 | 歩 | 歩 | 歩 | | 歩 | 歩 | 3 |
| | 歩 | | | | | 歩 | | | 4 |
| | | | | | | | | | 5 |
| | | 歩 | | | | | | 歩 | 6 |
| 歩 | 歩 | | 歩 | 歩 | 歩 | 歩 | 歩 | | 7 |
| | 角 | | | | | | 飛 | | 8 |
| 香 | 桂 | 銀 | 金 | 玉 | 金 | 銀 | 桂 | 香 | 9 |

☗ pieces in hand: –
1. ☗P-76 ☖P-34
2. ☗P-16 ☖P-84

After opening both bishop diagonals (1. P-76 P-34), White has not revealed to Black what their strategy will be. If Black wishes to play a Ranging Rook opening (like Fourth File Rook), Black may only choose a particular Ranging Rook opening if White chooses a Static Rook opening while they may want to choose a different set of openings if White chooses a Ranging Rook opening. Therefore, pushing an edge pawn (2. P-16) in the first two moves is a noncommittal move by Black aiming to wait and see what their opponent's opening will be. This edge pawn push also fits well the common Mino castle construction on the right side regardless of whether playing against a Ranging Rook or Static Rook opponent. If White pushes their rook pawn indicating Static Rook (2...P-84), then Black can choose a Fourth File position. This is often seen in the Fujii System strategies, which can develop with 3. P-66 S-62 4. R-68 K-42 5. S-38.

Of course, White can sidestep the issue by playing a noncommittal edge pawn as well with 2...P-14.

=== Frequency of initial move sequences ===
Out of the 64,046 recorded (mostly) professional games on Kyokumenpedia (局面ペヂィア) as of 2018 Mar 17, 77.2% started with a bishop pawn opening (P-76) and 20.8% started with a rook pawn opening (P-26).

A less-common first move (1.6% of Kyokumenpedia games) is the king's pawn (P-56).

Other first moves are relatively rare.

== Handicap openings ==
6-Piece Handicap
☖ pieces in hand: –

| 9 | 8 | 7 | 6 | 5 | 4 | 3 | 2 | 1 |
| | | 銀 | 金 | 王 | 金 | 銀 | | | 1 |
| | | | | | | | | | 2 |
| 歩 | 歩 | 歩 | 歩 | 歩 | 歩 | 歩 | 歩 | 歩 | 3 |
| | | | | | | | | | 4 |
| | | | | | | | | | 5 |
| | | | | | | | | | 6 |
| 歩 | 歩 | 歩 | 歩 | 歩 | 歩 | 歩 | 歩 | 歩 | 7 |
| | 角 | | | | | | 飛 | | 8 |
| 香 | 桂 | 銀 | 金 | 玉 | 金 | 銀 | 桂 | 香 | 9 |

☗ pieces in hand: –

Games between players of different strengths are often played with pieces removed from the stronger player's side.

Many of these handicap games have their own jōsekis.

== See also ==
- Shogi opening sequences
- Shogi strategy
- Castle (shogi)
- Chess opening

== Bibliography ==
- Fairbairn, John (1984). Shogi for Beginners. Ishi Press. ISBN 978-4-8718-720-10.
- Grimbergen, Reijer; Rollason, Jeff (2003). "Board Maps and Hill-Climbing for Opening and Middle-Game Play for Shogi". In Schaeffer, Jonathan; Müller, Martin; Björnsson, Yngvi (eds.). Computers and Games: Third International Conference, CG 2002, Edmonton, Canada, July 25–27, 2002, Revised Papers. Lecture Notes in Computer Science. Vol. 2883. Springer-Verlag. pp. 171–187. doi:10.1007/978-3-540-40031-8_12. ISBN 978-3-540-20545-6. ISSN 0302-9743 – via Google Books.
- Hodges, George, ed. (1977). "Shogi openings". Shogi (10): 9, 12–13.
- Hosking, Tony (1997). The art of shogi. The Shogi Foundation. ISBN 978-0-95310-890-9.
- "Kyokumenpedia" 局面ペディア [Kyokumenpedia]. Kyokumenpedia (in Japanese). Team ISCube.: Many shogi games (professional, online, AI) put into a decision tree structure with user-generated commentary and references and some opening classifications.
- "kieta senpō no nazo" 消えた戦法の謎 [Quest of the Lost Systems]. Shogi.Net. Mainichi Communications Co. 1995.
- "Tanigawa Kōji no Honsuji wo Mikiwame" 谷川浩司の本筋を見極め [Finding the Main Line by Koji Tanigawa]. NHK将棋講座 (NHK Shōgi Kōza). Episode 1 (in Japanese). 2006. NHK-E.
- 加藤, 治郎 [Katō, Jirō] (1992) [1970]. 将棋は歩から: 上巻. 東京書店. ISBN 4-88574-409-1.
