= Pull back (disambiguation) =

Pull back or pullback may refer to:

== In mathematics ==
- Pullback, a name given to two different mathematical processes
- Pullback (cohomology), a term in topology
- Pullback (differential geometry), a term in differential geometry
- Pullback (category theory), a term in category theory
- Pullback attractor, an aspect of a random dynamical system
- Pullback bundle, the fiber bundle induced by a map of its base space

== Other ==
- Pull-back (finance), a term in financial trading
- Pullback motor, a clockwork motor often used in toy cars
- Euscirrhopterus poeyi, known as the pullback moth
- Iijima Bishop Pullback, an opening in the game of shogi
- The opposite of a pushback (migration)
