= Ryūma =

- Gender: Male

Origin
- Origin: Japanese
- Meaning: Different meanings depending on the kanji used

Ryūma, Ryuma or Ryuuma (written: 龍磨 or 竜馬) is a masculine Japanese given name. Notable people with the name include:

- Ryuma Kidokoro (城所 龍磨; born 1985), Japanese baseball player
- Ryuuma Tonari (都成 竜馬; born 1990), Japanese shogi player
