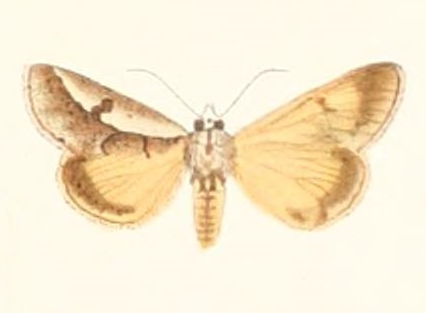
- Euscirrhopterus poeyi

Scientific classification
- Kingdom: Animalia
- Phylum: Arthropoda
- Class: Insecta
- Order: Lepidoptera
- Superfamily: Noctuoidea
- Family: Noctuidae
- Subfamily: Agaristinae
- Genus: Euscirrhopterus; Grote, 1866

Synonyms
- Heterandra Herrich-Schäffer, 1866; Copidryas Grote, 1876; Laquea Jordan, 1896; Hortonius Dyar, 1926

= Euscirrhopterus =

Genus of moths

Euscirrhopterus is a genus of moths of the family Noctuidae.

== Species ==
- Euscirrhopterus cosyra Druce, 1896
- Euscirrhopterus discifera Hampson, 1901
- Euscirrhopterus gloveri Grote & Robinson, 1868
- Euscirrhopterus klagesi Jordan, 1908
- Euscirrhopterus poeyi Grote, 1866
- Euscirrhopterus valkeri Hampson, 1901
