= First File Rook =

First File Rook
☖ pieces in hand: –

9	8	7	6	5	4	3	2	1
香	桂	銀	金	王	金	銀	桂	香	1
	飛						角		2
歩		歩	歩	歩	歩		歩	歩	3
						歩			4
	歩							歩	5
								飛	6
歩	歩	歩	歩	歩	歩	歩	歩		7
	角								8
香	桂	銀	金	玉	金	銀	桂	香	9

☗ pieces in hand: –

In shogi, First File Rook (一間飛車 ikkenbisha or ichigenbisha) is a Static Rook surprise opening in which the player's rook supports an attack on the player's rightmost edge file. The player may also attempt to move the lance first and set the rook behind it to attack via the first file, but this is rarely to never used in professional play, since white can counterattack by pushing their rook pawn.

== See also ==
- Static Rook
