= Demon Slayer (shogi) =

Trap opening in shogi

Demon Slayer
☖ pieces in hand: 角

9	8	7	6	5	4	3	2	1
香	桂		金	王	金		桂	香	1
	飛		銀				銀		2
歩		歩		歩	歩		歩	歩	3
	歩		歩			歩			4
		歩	桂	角					5
									6
歩	歩		歩	歩	歩	歩	歩	歩	7
							飛		8
香		銀	金	玉	金	銀	桂	香	9

☗ pieces in hand: –

In shogi, Demon Slayer or Demon Killer (鬼殺し onigoroshi) is a trap opening initiated by Black that characteristically advances their left knight blocking their bishop's diagonal.

Later moves attempt an attack using a further advanced knight and also possibly against White's left silver.

If defended against properly by White, then it puts Black in an unfavorable position. Therefore, it is designed to trap novice players.

== Development ==
Demon Slayer: Initial moves
☖ pieces in hand: –

9	8	7	6	5	4	3	2	1
香	桂	銀	金	王	金	銀	桂	香	1
	飛						角		2
歩	歩	歩	歩	歩	歩		歩	歩	3
						歩			4
									5
		歩							6
歩	歩	桂	歩	歩	歩	歩	歩	歩	7
	角						飛		8
香		銀	金	玉	金	銀	桂	香	9

☗ pieces in hand: –
continued...
☖ pieces in hand: –

9	8	7	6	5	4	3	2	1
香	桂	銀	金	王	金	銀	桂	香	1
	飛						角		2
歩		歩	歩	歩	歩		歩	歩	3
	歩					歩			4
			桂						5
		歩							6
歩	歩		歩	歩	歩	歩	歩	歩	7
	角						飛		8
香		銀	金	玉	金	銀	桂	香	9

☗ pieces in hand: –

continued...
☖ pieces in hand: –

9	8	7	6	5	4	3	2	1
香	桂		金	王	金	銀	桂	香	1
	飛		銀				角		2
歩		歩	歩	歩	歩		歩	歩	3
	歩					歩			4
		歩	桂						5
									6
歩	歩		歩	歩	歩	歩	歩	歩	7
	角						飛		8
香		銀	金	玉	金	銀	桂	香	9

☗ pieces in hand: –
continued...
☖ pieces in hand: 角

9	8	7	6	5	4	3	2	1
香	桂		金	王	金		桂	香	1
	飛		銀				銀		2
歩		歩		歩	歩		歩	歩	3
	歩		歩			歩			4
		歩	桂	角					5
									6
歩	歩		歩	歩	歩	歩	歩	歩	7
							飛		8
香		銀	金	玉	金	銀	桂	香	9

☗ pieces in hand: –

position aimed for
☖ pieces in hand: 角

9	8	7	6	5	4	3	2	1
香	桂			王	金		桂	香	1
	飛		銀						2
歩		歩	金	歩	歩	銀	歩	歩	3
	歩	歩	角			歩			4
			桂						5
									6
歩	歩		歩	歩	歩	歩	歩	歩	7
		飛							8
香		銀	金	玉	金	銀	桂	香	9

☗ pieces in hand: 歩
continued...
☖ pieces in hand: 角角

9	8	7	6	5	4	3	2	1
香	桂			王	金		桂	香	1
	飛		銀						2
歩		と		歩	歩	銀	歩	歩	3
	歩		金			歩			4
			桂						5
									6
歩	歩		歩	歩	歩	歩	歩	歩	7
		飛							8
香		銀	金	玉	金	銀	桂	香	9

☗ pieces in hand: 歩歩

Demon Slayer: The goal
☖ pieces in hand: 角角 桂 歩

9	8	7	6	5	4	3	2	1
香				王	金		桂	香	1
	飛								2
歩		龍		歩	歩	銀	歩	歩	3
	歩		金			歩			4
									5
									6
歩	歩		歩	歩	歩	歩	歩	歩	7
									8
香		銀	金	玉	金	銀	桂	香	9

☗ pieces in hand: 銀 桂 歩歩

=== Defending against Demon Slayer ===
Demon Slayer: Proper defense
☖ pieces in hand: 角

9	8	7	6	5	4	3	2	1
香	桂	銀		王	金		桂	香	1
	飛						銀		2
歩		歩	金	歩	歩		歩	歩	3
	歩		歩			歩			4
		歩	桂	角					5
									6
歩	歩		歩	歩	歩	歩	歩	歩	7
							飛		8
香		銀	金	玉	金	銀	桂	香	9

☗ pieces in hand: –

Demon Slayer can be defended against by moving White's right gold to 63.

== New Demon Slayer ==
New Demon Slayer
☖ pieces in hand: –

9	8	7	6	5	4	3	2	1
香	桂	銀	金	王	金	銀	桂	香	1
	飛						角		2
歩		歩	歩	歩	歩		歩	歩	3
						歩			4
	歩	歩							5
									6
歩	歩	角	歩	歩	歩	歩	歩	歩	7
		飛							8
香	桂	銀	金	玉	金	銀	桂	香	9

☗ pieces in hand: –
New Demon Slayer
☖ pieces in hand: 角

9	8	7	6	5	4	3	2	1
香	桂	銀	金	王	金	銀	桂	香	1
	飛								2
歩		歩	歩	歩	歩		歩	歩	3
						歩			4
	歩	歩							5
									6
歩	歩	桂	歩	歩	歩	歩	歩	歩	7
		飛							8
香		銀	金	玉	金	銀	桂	香	9

☗ pieces in hand: 角

New Demon Slayer (新鬼殺し shin oni koroshi) is a variation of the Demon Slayer opening.

== See also ==
- Ranging Rook
- Shogi opening

== Bibliography ==
- Hosking, Tony (1996). The art of shogi. The Shogi Foundation. ISBN 978-0-95310-890-9.
- Kitao, Madoka (2011). Joseki at a glance. Translated by Kawasaki, Tomohide. Nekomado. ISBN 978-4-9052-2501-0.
