= Eiji Iijima =

Japanese professional shogi player

- Native name: 飯島栄治
- Born: September 16, 1979 (age 46)
- Hometown: Nakano, Tokyo
- Nationality: Japanese

Career
- Achieved professional status: April 1, 2000 (aged 20)
- Badge Number: 240
- Rank: 8-dan
- Teacher: Noboru Sakurai (8-dan)
- Meijin class: C1
- Ryūō class: 4

Websites
- JSA profile page

Eiji Iijima (飯島 栄治, Iijima Eiji; born September 16, 1979) is a Japanese professional shogi player ranked 8-dan.

== Shogi professional ==
=== Theoretical contributions ===
Iijima invented the Iijima Bishop Pullback strategy which is named after him. He received the 16th Masuda Award (April 2009 – March 2010) for developing the strategy.

=== Promotion history ===
Iijima's promotion history is as follows:

- 6-kyū: 1991
- 1-dan: 1995
- 4-dan: April 1, 2000
- 5-dan: September 7, 2004
- 6-dan: September 11, 2008
- 7-dan: October 22, 2010
- 8-dan: February 2, 2021
