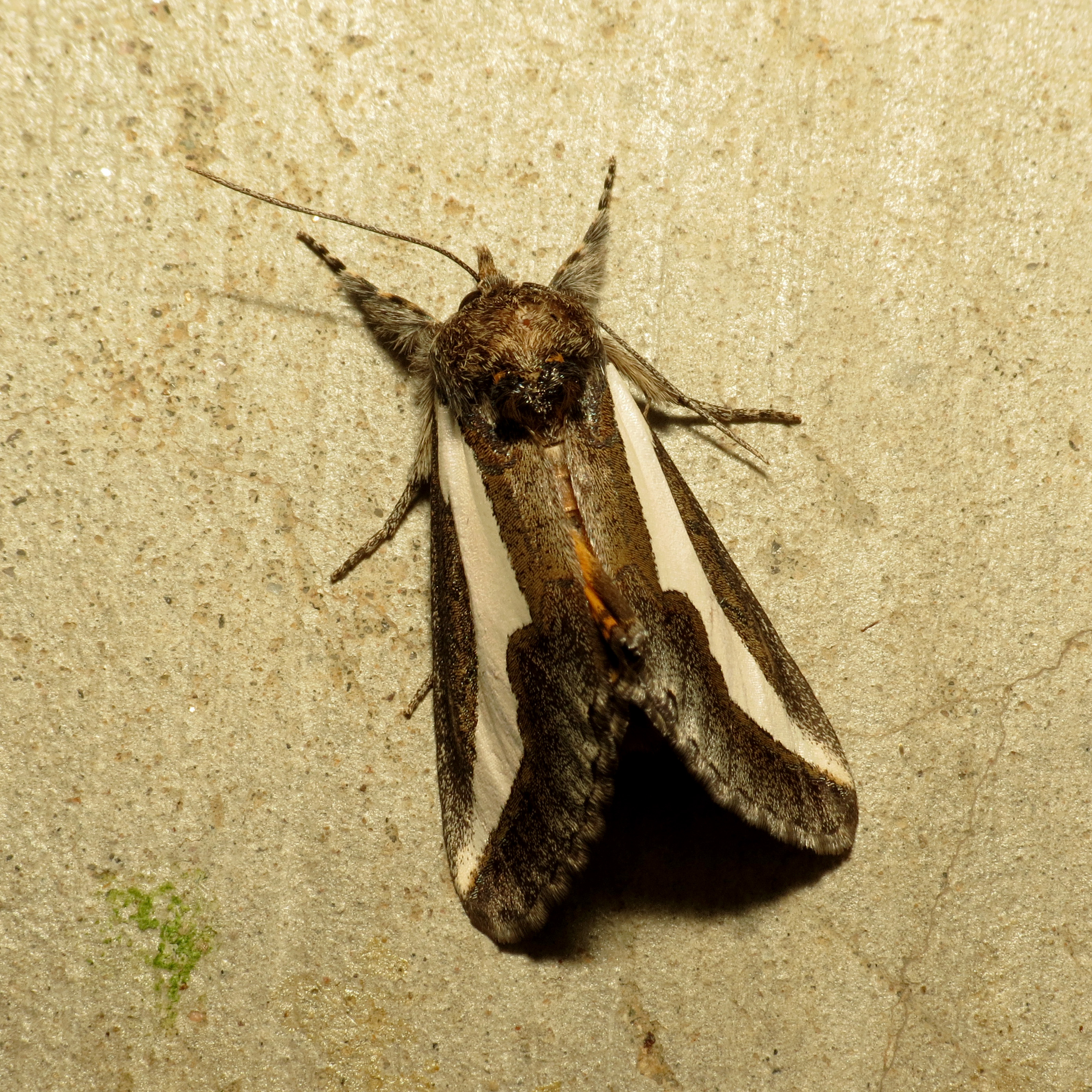

Scientific classification
- Domain: Eukaryota
- Kingdom: Animalia
- Phylum: Arthropoda
- Class: Insecta
- Order: Lepidoptera
- Superfamily: Noctuoidea
- Family: Noctuidae
- Genus: Euscirrhopterus
- Species: E. cosyra

Binomial name
- Euscirrhopterus cosyra (H. Druce, 1896)

= Euscirrhopterus cosyra =

Species of moth

Euscirrhopterus cosyra, the staghorn cholla moth, is a moth in the family Noctuidae (the owlet moths). The species was first described by Herbert Druce in 1896.

The MONA or Hodges number for Euscirrhopterus cosyra is 9308.
