= Tonari opening =

In shogi, the Tonari opening (都成流 tonari-ryū) is a Ranging Rook surprise opening that was invented by professional Ryūma Tonari.

It was presented on the 囲碁・将棋チャンネル (Go/Shogi Channel) by professional player Tetsurō Itodani.
