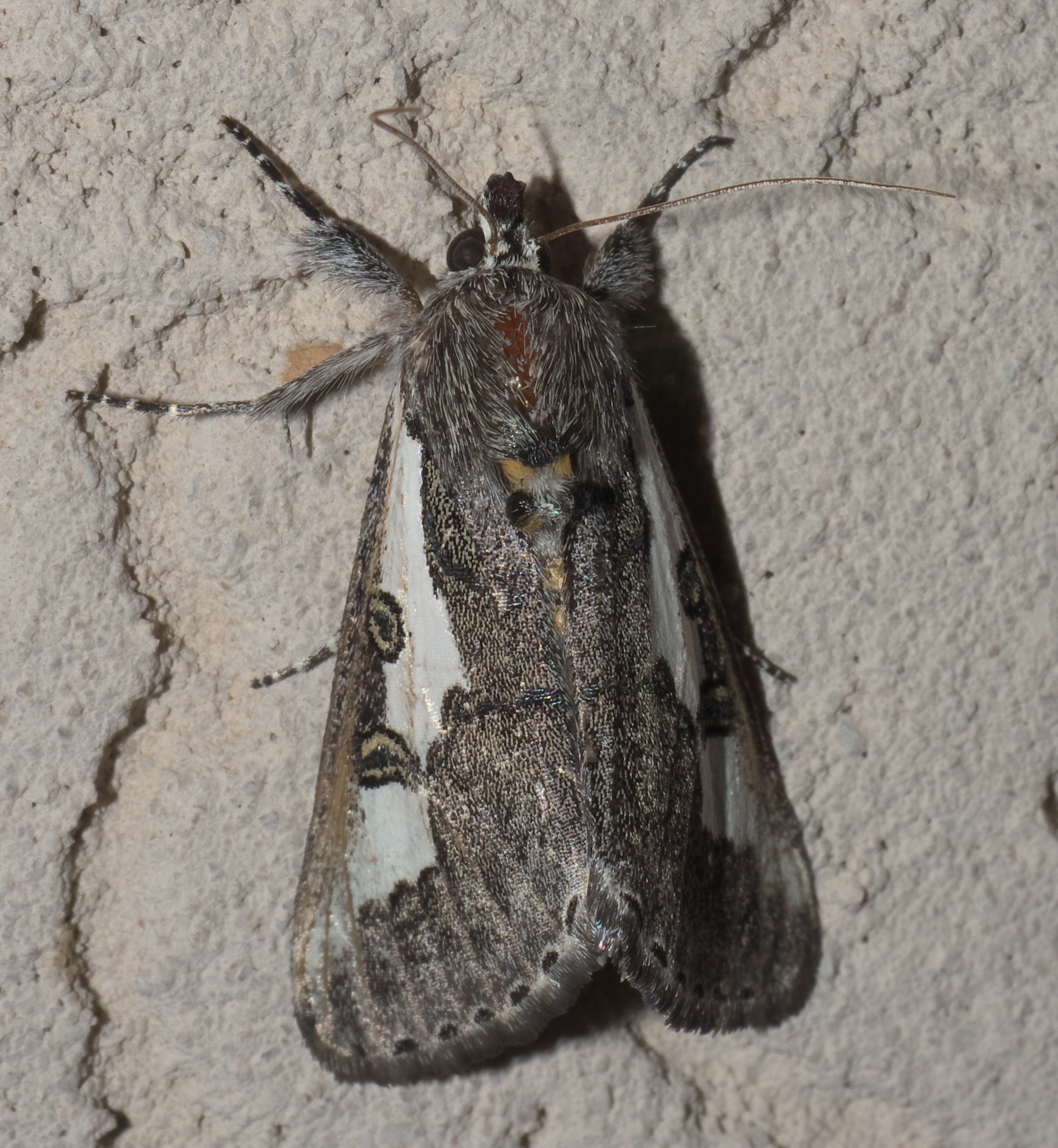

Scientific classification
- Kingdom: Animalia
- Phylum: Arthropoda
- Clade: Pancrustacea
- Class: Insecta
- Order: Lepidoptera
- Superfamily: Noctuoidea
- Family: Noctuidae
- Genus: Euscirrhopterus
- Species: E. gloveri

Binomial name
- Euscirrhopterus gloveri Grote & Robinson, 1868

= Euscirrhopterus gloveri =

Species of moth

Euscirrhopterus gloveri, the purslane moth, is an owlet moth (family Noctuidae). The species was first described by Augustus Radcliffe Grote and Coleman Townsend Robinson in 1868. It is found in North America.

The MONA or Hodges number for Euscirrhopterus gloveri is 9307.
