= Iijima Bishop Pullback =

Shogi opening

White's Iijima Bishop Pullback vs
Black's Fourth File Rook
☖ pieces in hand: –

9	8	7	6	5	4	3	2	1
香	桂		金	王	金	角	桂	香	1
	飛		銀			銀			2
歩		歩	歩		歩	歩	歩	歩	3
	歩			歩					4
									5
		歩	歩						6
歩	歩			歩	歩	歩	歩	歩	7
	角	銀	飛		玉				8
香	桂		金		金	銀	桂	香	9

☗ pieces in hand: –
Black's Iijima Bishop Pullback vs
White's Fourth File Rook
☖ pieces in hand: –

9	8	7	6	5	4	3	2	1
香	桂	銀	金		金	銀	桂	香	1
		王			飛		角		2
歩	歩	歩	歩	歩	歩		歩	歩	3
						歩			4
									5
				歩			歩		6
歩	歩	歩	歩		歩	歩		歩	7
		銀			銀		飛		8
香	桂	角	金	玉	金		桂	香	9

☗ pieces in hand: –

In shogi, Iijima Bishop Pullback or Iijima's Back Bishop (飯島流引き角 Iijima-ryuu hiki kaku) is a less common defensive Static Rook opening used against a Ranging Rook opponent. It has been used in both Black and White positions by professional players.

It is characterized by not opening the bishop's diagonal with a pawn push (P-34 or P-76) and instead moving the bishop back (to 31 if played by White or 79 if played by Black) so that it can then exit one's camp via the central (5th) file, which has been opened by advancing the central pawn. With the bishop out of way, it possible to castle the king into a Left Mino castle.

The opening is named after professional player Eiji Iijima who has won the Masuda Award in 2009 for developing the strategy.

== vs Central Rook ==
White plays Static Rook
☖ pieces in hand: –

9	8	7	6	5	4	3	2	1
香	桂	銀	金	王	金	銀	桂	香	1
	飛						角		2
歩		歩	歩	歩	歩	歩	歩	歩	3
	歩								4
									5
		歩							6
歩	歩		歩	歩	歩	歩	歩	歩	7
	角						飛		8
香	桂	銀	金	玉	金	銀	桂	香	9

☗ pieces in hand: –
Black suggests Central Rook
☖ pieces in hand: –

9	8	7	6	5	4	3	2	1
香	桂	銀	金	王	金	銀	桂	香	1
	飛						角		2
歩		歩	歩	歩	歩	歩	歩	歩	3
	歩								4
									5
		歩		歩					6
歩	歩		歩		歩	歩	歩	歩	7
	角						飛		8
香	桂	銀	金	玉	金	銀	桂	香	9

☗ pieces in hand: –

The example here is an Iijima Bishop Pullback position played by White against a Central Rook position played by Black.

White first suggests their intention to play a Static Rook position while Black hints at a Central Rook position.

Pawn push & defense
☖ pieces in hand: –

9	8	7	6	5	4	3	2	1
香	桂	銀	金	王	金	銀	桂	香	1
	飛						角		2
歩		歩	歩	歩	歩	歩	歩	歩	3
									4
	歩								5
		歩		歩					6
歩	歩	角	歩		歩	歩	歩	歩	7
							飛		8
香	桂	銀	金	玉	金	銀	桂	香	9

☗ pieces in hand: –
Black plays Central Rook
☖ pieces in hand: –

9	8	7	6	5	4	3	2	1
香	桂	銀	金	王	金	銀	桂	香	1
	飛						角		2
歩		歩	歩		歩	歩	歩	歩	3
				歩					4
	歩								5
		歩		歩					6
歩	歩	角	歩		歩	歩	歩	歩	7
				飛					8
香	桂	銀	金	玉	金	銀	桂	香	9

☗ pieces in hand: –

After Black pushes their rook pawn to the mid rank, Black shows their clear intention for Central Rook.

Bishop Pullback
☖ pieces in hand: –

9	8	7	6	5	4	3	2	1
香	桂	銀	金	王	金		桂	香	1
	飛					銀	角		2
歩		歩	歩		歩	歩	歩	歩	3
				歩					4
	歩								5
		歩		歩					6
歩	歩	角	歩		歩	歩	歩	歩	7
				飛					8
香	桂	銀	金	玉	金	銀	桂	香	9

☗ pieces in hand: –
Bishop Pullback
☖ pieces in hand: –

9	8	7	6	5	4	3	2	1
香	桂	銀	金	王	金	角	桂	香	1
	飛					銀			2
歩		歩	歩		歩	歩	歩	歩	3
				歩					4
	歩								5
		歩		歩					6
歩	歩	角	歩		歩	歩	歩	歩	7
				飛	玉				8
香	桂	銀	金		金	銀	桂	香	9

☗ pieces in hand: –

From this point, White starts the Iijima Bishop Pullback development by moving their left silver straight up to make way for a space in which to pull back their bishop. Black starts castling their king rightward, and White pulls their bishop back to rank 1, which allows for a possible pawn and bishop exchange on the eighth file at the 86 square focal point.

White's Iijima Bishop Pullback
☖ pieces in hand: –

9	8	7	6	5	4	3	2	1
香	桂	銀		王	金	角	桂	香	1
	飛			金		銀			2
歩		歩	歩		歩	歩	歩	歩	3
				歩					4
	歩								5
		歩		歩					6
歩	歩	角	歩		歩	歩	歩	歩	7
				飛		玉			8
香	桂	銀	金		金	銀	桂	香	9

☗ pieces in hand: –
Left Mino castle
☖ pieces in hand: –

9	8	7	6	5	4	3	2	1
					金		桂	香	1
				金		銀	王		2
				歩	歩	歩	歩		3
								歩	4
									5
									6
									7
									8
									9

☗ pieces in hand: –

In later development, White's left silver and right gold have been moved to construct a Left Mino castle.

White's Iijima Bishop Pullback
☖ pieces in hand: 歩

9	8	7	6	5	4	3	2	1
香	桂				金		桂	香	1
	飛			金		銀	王		2
歩		歩	銀	角	歩	歩	歩	歩	3
			歩						4
	歩								5
		歩		銀					6
歩	歩	角	歩		歩	歩	歩	歩	7
				飛		銀	玉		8
香	桂	銀	金		金		桂	香	9

☗ pieces in hand: 歩

In the last diagram, both players have (a) finished moving their kings into their castles, (b) developed their attacking silvers further, and (c) exchanged their central file pawns.

== vs Fourth File Rook ==
Fujii System vs Bishop Pullback
☖ pieces in hand: –

9	8	7	6	5	4	3	2	1
香	桂		金	王	金		桂	香	1
	飛		銀			銀	角		2
歩		歩	歩		歩	歩	歩		3
	歩			歩				歩	4
									5
		歩	歩					歩	6
歩	歩			歩	歩	歩	歩		7
	角		飛			銀			8
香	桂	銀	金	玉	金		桂	香	9

☗ pieces in hand: –

1. P-76 P-84, 2. P-16 P-14, 3. P-66 S-62, 4. R-68 P-54, 5. S-38 S-32

== See also ==
- Static Rook

== Bibliography ==
- 勝又, 清和 [in Japanese] (2014). 新手ポカ妙手選: 居飛車編. マイナビ出版. ISBN 978-4-83995-058-3.
