= Kōji Tanigawa =

Japanese professional shogi player

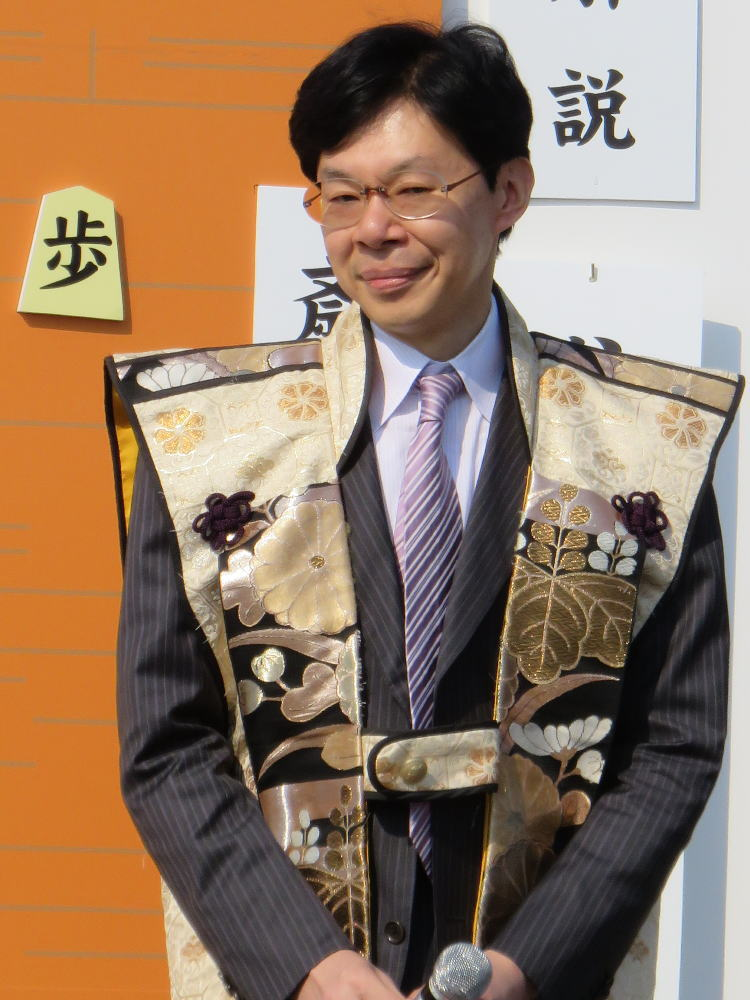
- Tanigawa at a human shogi event in November 2017.
- Native name: 谷川浩司
- Born: April 6, 1962 (age 64)
- Hometown: Kobe

Career
- Achieved professional status: December 20, 1976 (aged 14)
- Badge number: 131
- Rank: 9-dan
- Teacher: Masakazu Wakamatsu (8-dan)
- Lifetime titles: Lifetime Meijin
- Major titles won: 27
- Tournaments won: 22
- Meijin class: B2
- Ryūō class: 4
- Notable students: Ryūma Tonari

Websites
- JSA profile page

Kōji Tanigawa (谷川 浩司, Tanigawa Kōji; born April 6, 1962) is a Japanese professional shogi player ranked 9-dan. He is the 17th Lifetime Meijin and also a former president of the Japan Shogi Association (JSA).

== Early life ==
Kōji Tanigawa was born in Kobe on April 6, 1962. He entered the Japan Shogi Association's apprentice school at the rank of 5-kyū in 1973 under the tutelage of shogi professional Masakazu Wakamatsu, was promoted to the rank of 1-dan in 1975, and was officially awarded professional status and the rank of 4-dan in 1976 at the age of fourteen, thus becoming the second person to obtain professional status while still a junior high school student.

== Shogi professional ==
In February 1979, Tanigawa won the 2nd Young Lions Tournament (1978) for his first championship as a professional.

Tanigawa's first major title match appearance came in 1983 when he challenged Hifumi Katō for the 41st Meijin title. Tanigawa won the match 4 games to 2 to not only win his first major title, but also to become the youngest player to ever win the Meijin title at the age of 21. The following year, he successfully defended his title by defeating Hidemitsu Moriyasu 4 games to 1 in the 42nd Meijin title match; he was however, unable to defend his title once again title in 1985, losing the 43rd Meijin title match to Makoto Nakahara 4 games to 2.

On March 10, 2011, Tanigawa became the 4th shogi professional to win 1200 official games when he defeated Daisuke Nakagawa.Tanigawa's age of 48 years and 11 months made him at that time the youngest player to achieve such a result.

On October 1, 2018, Tanigawa became the fifth shogi professional to win 1300 official games, and on January 15, 2025, he became the third player to win 1400 official games.

=== Promotion history ===
The promotion history of Tanigawa is as follows:

- 5-kyū: 1973
- 1-dan: 1975
- 4-dan: December 20, 1976
- 5-dan: April 1, 1979
- 6-dan: April 1, 1980
- 7-dan: April 1, 1981
- 8-dan: April 1, 1982
- 9-dan: April 1, 1984

=== Titles and other championships ===
Tanigawa has appeared in major title matches a total of 57 times and has won 27 major titles. He has won the Meijin title 5 times, thus qualifying for the Lifetime Meijin title. In addition to major titles, Tanigawa has won 22 other shogi championships during his career.

==== Major titles ====
| Title | Years | Number of times |
|---|---|---|
| Ryūō | 1990–91, 1996–97 | 4 |
| Meijin | 1983–84, 1988–89, 1997 | 5 |
| Ōi | 1987, 1989–91, 2002–03 | 6 |
| Kiō | 1985, 1987, 2003 | 3 |
| Ōshō | 1991–94 | 4 |
| Ōza | 1990 | 1 |
| Kisei | 1991–92, (Note: The Kisei title was contested twice yearly up to 1994. Tanigawa won the title once in 1991 and twice in 1992.) 1999 | 4 |

==== Other championships ====
| Tournament | Years | Number of times |
|---|---|---|
| ^{*}All Nihon Pro | 1983–85, 1987, 1994, 1996, 1999 | 7 |
| Nihon Series | 1989–90, 1992, 1996–97, 2009 | 6 |
| ^{*}All Star Kachinuki-sen | 1982, 1984, 1986 | 3 |
| ^{*}Tennō-sen | 1989, 1991 | 2 |
| Ginga Tournament | 2002 | 1 |
| NHK Cup | 1985 | 1 |
| ^{*}Meiki-sen | 1979 | 1 |
| ^{*}Young Lions | 1978 | 1 |

Note: Tournaments marked with an asterisk (*) are no longer held.

=== Awards and honors ===
Tanigawa has received a number of awards and honors throughout his career for his accomplishments both on an off the shogi board. These include the Annual Shogi Awards given out by the JSA for performance in official games as well as other JSA awards for career accomplishments, and awards received from governmental organizations, etc. for contributions made to Japanese society.

==== Annual Shogi Awards ====
- 6th Annual Awards (April 1978 – March 1979): Best New Player
- 7th Annual Awards (April 1979 – March 1980): Technique Award
- 9th Annual Awards (April 1981 – March 1982): Technique Award
- 10th Annual Awards (April 1982 – March 1983): Distinguished Service Award
- 11th Annual Awards (April 1983 – March 1984): Special Award
- 13th Annual Awards (April 1985 – March 1986): Player of the Year, Most Games Won, Most Games Played
- 14th Annual Awards (April 1986 – March 1987): Most Games Won, Most Games Played
- 15th Annual Awards (April 1987 – March 1988): Player of the Year
- 18th Annual Awards (April 1990 – March 1991): Player of the Year
- 19th Annual Awards (April 1991 – March 1992): Player of the Year
- 22nd Annual Awards (April 1994 – March 1995): Special Award
- 24th Annual Awards (April 1996 – March 1997): Most Games Played
- 25th Annual Awards (April 1997 – March 1998): Player of the Year
- 26th Annual Awards (April 1998 – March 1999): Most Games Played
- 27th Annual Awards (April 1999 – March 2000): Most Games Played
- 30th Annual Awards (April 2002 – March 2003): Special Award
- 31st Annual Awards (April 2003 – March 2004): Masuda Award
- 34th Annual Awards (April 2006 – March 2007): Game of the Year

==== Other awards ====
- 1983, September: Kobe City Culture Special Award
- 1988: Kobe City Special Award
- 1989: Kobe City Government Meritorius Citizen Award
- 1991: Shogi Honor Fighting-spirit Award (Awarded by JSA in recognition of winning 600 official games as a professional)
- 1992: Kobe City Special Award
- 1997, June: Hyōgo Prefecture Honor Award, Kobe City Culture Honor Award
- 2001: 25 Years Service Award (Awarded by the JSA in recognition of being an active professional for twenty-five years)
- 2002: Kobe City Special Award, Special Shogi Honor Award (Awarded by JSA in recognition of winning 1000 official games as a professional)
- 2007: Hyogo Prefecture Culture Award
- 2014: Japanese Government's Medal of Honor with Purple Ribbons

=== Year-end prize money and game fee ranking ===
Tanigawa has finished in the "Top 10" of the JSA's year-end prize money and game fee rankings each year from 1993 to 2007, and then again in 2013. He also has finished in the "Top 3" eight times, and was the top money winner in 1997.

| Year | Amount | Rank |
|---|---|---|
| 1993 | ¥56,500,000 | 2nd |
| 1994 | ¥43,590,000 | 4th |
| 1995 | ¥54,020,000 | 2nd |
| 1996 | ¥50,690,000 | 2nd |
| 1997 | ¥117,620,000 | 1st |
| 1998 | ¥95,390,000 | 2nd |
| 1999 | ¥67,690,000 | 2nd |
| 2000 | ¥67,390,000 | 2nd |
| 2001 | ¥48,460,000 | 4th |
| 2002 | ¥42,310,000 | 5th |
| 2003 | ¥42,910,000 | 4th |
| 2004 | ¥46,730,000 | 3rd |
| 2005 | ¥28,440,000 | 5th |
| 2006 | ¥32,050,000 | 5th |
| 2007 | ¥23,500,000 | 9th |
| 2013 | ¥18,180,000 | 8th |

- Note: All amounts are given in Japanese yen and include prize money and fees earned from official tournaments and games held from January 1 to December 31.

== JSA executive ==
Tanigawa was selected to be a senior managing director of Japan Shogi Association for a two-year term at the association's 62nd General Meeting on May 26, 2011. On December 18, 2012, JSA president Kunio Yonenaga died, and Tanigawa was subsequently selected to be his replacement at a special JSA members meeting held on December 25, 2012. This made him the first JSA president from the Kansai region.

Tanigawa was re-elected as president at the 64th (June 7, 2013) and 66th (June 4, 2015) General Meetings; however, he announced on January 18, 2017, that he had decided to resign in order to accept responsibility for the JSA's handling of the 29th Ryūō challenger controversy. Tanigawa continued to serve as president until his successor was chosen at a special meeting of the JSA membership on February 6, 2017.

== Video games ==
In the late 1980s, Pony Canyon released a line of Shogi video games for the MSX and Famicom featuring Tanigawa. The series was titled 谷川浩司の将棋指南 (Tanigawa Kōji no Shōgi Shinan, Kōji Tanigawa's Shogi Lessons).
