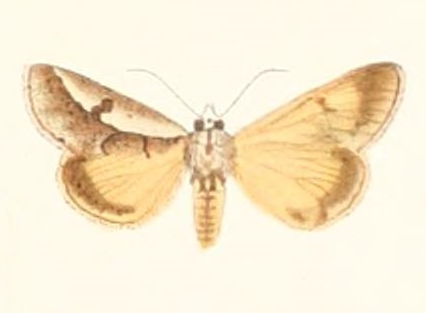

Scientific classification
- Kingdom: Animalia
- Phylum: Arthropoda
- Class: Insecta
- Order: Lepidoptera
- Superfamily: Noctuoidea
- Family: Noctuidae
- Genus: Euscirrhopterus
- Species: E. poeyi

Binomial name
- Euscirrhopterus poeyi Grote, 1866

Synonyms
- Heterandra disparilis Herrich-Schäffer, 1866; Euscirrhopterus disparilis; Euthisanotia argentata Druce, 1894

= Euscirrhopterus poeyi =

Species of moth

Euscirrhopterus poeyi, the pullback moth, is a moth of the family Noctuidae. The species was first described by Augustus Radcliffe Grote in 1866. It is found from southern Florida and Mexico, through Central America to Brazil. It is also found in the Caribbean, including Cuba.

The wingspan is about 34 mm for females and 38 mm for males. Adults are sexually dimorphic.

The larvae feed on Pisonia aculeata.
