= Ryūma Tonari =

Japanese shogi player (born 1990)

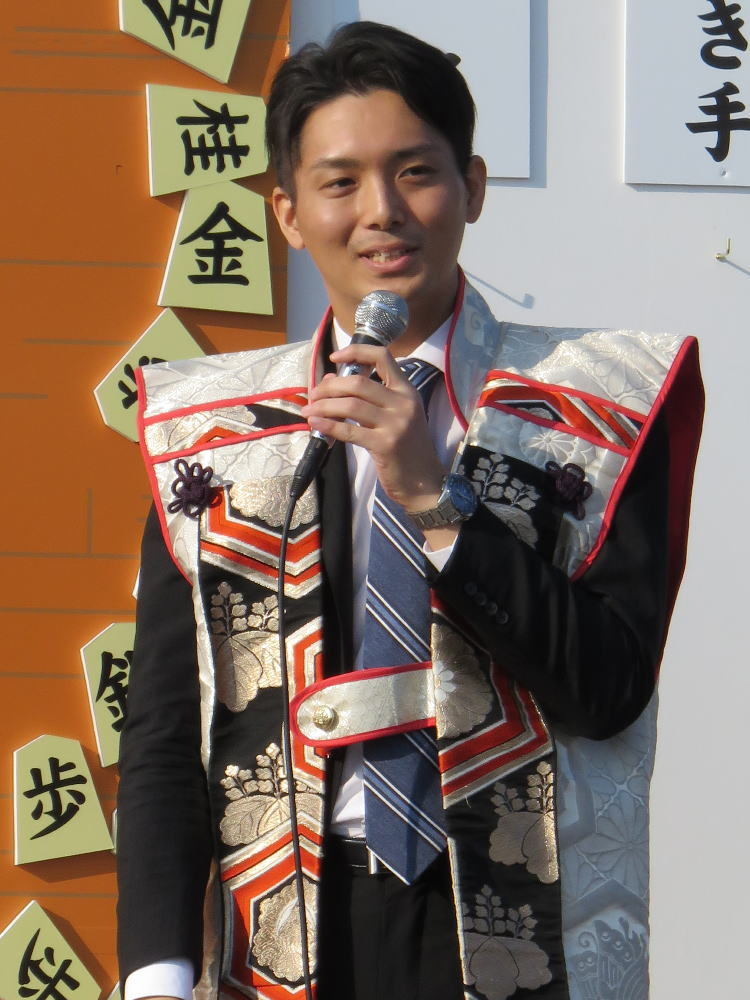
- Tonari at a human shogi event in November 2017.
- Native name: 都成竜馬
- Born: January 17, 1990 (age 36)
- Hometown: Miyazaki, Miyazaki

Career
- Achieved professional status: April 1, 2016 (aged 26)
- Badge number: 304
- Rank: 7-dan
- Teacher: Kōji Tanigawa (9-dan)
- Tournaments won: 1
- Meijin class: B2
- Ryūō class: 2

Websites
- JSA profile page

Ryūma Tonari (都成 竜馬, Tonari Ryūma; born January 17, 1990) is a Japanese professional shogi player ranked 7-dan.

== Early life, amateur shogi and apprentice professional ==
Tonari was born on January 17, 1990, in Miyazaki, Miyazaki. As a young boy, he learned how to play shogi from watching his father and older brother playing each other. In 2000, Tonari defeated fellow future professional Taichi Nakamura to win the 25th Elementary School Student Meijin Tournament as a fifth-grade student at Miyazaki Ehira Elementary School.

Tonari entered the Japan Shogi Association's apprentice school at the rank of 6-kyū as a student of shogi professional Kōji Tanigawa in September 2000. He was promoted to the rank of 3-dan in October 2007, and he became the only apprentice professional 3-dan to win the Shinjin-Ō tournament when he defeated shogi professional Tetsuya Fujimori 2 games to 1 for the 44th Shinjin-Ō title in October 2013. Tonari obtained professional status and the rank of 4-dan in April 2016 after winning the 58th 3-dan League with a record of 14 wins and 4 losses.

== Shogi professional ==
Tonari invented the Tonari opening, which is named after him.

=== Promotion history ===
Tonari's promotion history is as follows:

- 6-kyū: September 2000
- 3-dan: October 2007
- 4-dan: April 1, 2016
- 5-dan: March 15, 2018
- 6-dan: November 13, 2019
- 7-dan: March 25, 2021

=== Titles and other championships ===
Tonari has yet to appear in a major title match, but he has won one non-major title championship.

=== Awards and honors ===
Tonari received the Japan Shogi Association Annual Shogi Award for "Special Game of the Year" for the 2014 Shogi Year for his game against Mitsunori Makino in the Round 2 of the 46th {Shinjin-Ō tournament.
