= Side Pawn Capture, Rapid Attack Bishop*33 =

Shogi opening

△ B*33
up to move 18
☖ pieces in hand: 歩歩

9	8	7	6	5	4	3	2	1
香	桂	銀	金	王		銀	桂	香	1
						金			2
歩		歩	歩	歩	歩	角		歩	3
						飛			4
									5
	飛	歩							6
歩			歩	歩	歩	歩		歩	7
	銀	金							8
香	桂			玉	金	銀	桂	香	9

☗ pieces in hand: 角 歩歩歩

Side Pawn Capture Rapid Attack Bishop*33 (横歩取り急戦3三角 yokofudori kyūsen san-san kaku) is a variation stemming from the Side Pawn Capture opening, in which White drops their bishop to 33 after they first trade pawns on the eighth file and then trade the bishops after Black takes White's side pawn.

== Development ==
Side Pawn Capture
up to move 15
☖ pieces in hand: 歩歩

9	8	7	6	5	4	3	2	1
香	桂	銀	金	王		銀	桂	香	1
						金	角		2
歩		歩	歩	歩	歩			歩	3
						飛			4
									5
	飛	歩							6
歩			歩	歩	歩	歩		歩	7
	角	金							8
香	桂	銀		玉	金	銀	桂	香	9

☗ pieces in hand: 歩歩歩
Bishop trade
up to move 16
☖ pieces in hand: 角 歩歩

9	8	7	6	5	4	3	2	1
香	桂	銀	金	王		銀	桂	香	1
						金			2
歩		歩	歩	歩	歩			歩	3
						飛			4
									5
	飛	歩							6
歩			歩	歩	歩	歩		歩	7
	馬	金							8
香	桂	銀		玉	金	銀	桂	香	9

☗ pieces in hand: 歩歩歩

Bishop Trade
up to move 17
☖ pieces in hand: 角 歩歩

9	8	7	6	5	4	3	2	1
香	桂	銀	金	王		銀	桂	香	1
						金			2
歩		歩	歩	歩	歩			歩	3
						飛			4
									5
	飛	歩							6
歩			歩	歩	歩	歩		歩	7
	銀	金							8
香	桂			玉	金	銀	桂	香	9

☗ pieces in hand: 角 歩歩歩

After Black takes the side pawn (see Side Pawn Capture for details), the Rapid Attack Bishop *33 variation starts with White making the bishop trade (8...Bx88+ 9.Sx88) like other rapid attack-style variations (such as the Double Side Pawn and Side Pawn B*45 variations). (Note: This bishop trade is one of the necessary moves to prevent a trap caused by Black trading the bishops first.)

Bishop drop to 33
up to move 18
☖ pieces in hand: 歩歩

9	8	7	6	5	4	3	2	1
香	桂	銀	金	王		銀	桂	香	1
						金			2
歩		歩	歩	歩	歩	角		歩	3
						飛			4
									5
	飛	歩							6
歩			歩	歩	歩	歩		歩	7
	銀	金							8
香	桂			玉	金	銀	桂	香	9

☗ pieces in hand: 角 歩歩歩

9...B*33. Then, the B*33 variation proper begins with a bishop drop on the 33 square.

White is now threatening to capture Black's silver on 88, which is what would happen if Black moves 10.R-36 as in the usual Side Pawn Capture variations.

Iijima considers four possible responses for Black.

10.B*77 and 10.N-77 block White's bishop, while 10.P*87 and 10.S-87 counterattack White's rook.

Iijima finds 10.N-77 to be the superior response, resulting in a position that ultimately greatly favors Black.

The 10. P*87 response is the only one found in professional games: Gohei Ono in 1872, Mitsuharu Mizorogi in 1913, Yūji Sase in 1957, and Terutaka Yasue in 1981.

B*77
☖ pieces in hand: 歩歩

9	8	7	6	5	4	3	2	1
香	桂	銀	金	王		銀	桂	香	1
						金			2
歩		歩	歩	歩	歩	角		歩	3
						飛			4
									5
	飛	歩							6
歩		角	歩	歩	歩	歩		歩	7
	銀	金							8
香	桂			玉	金	銀	桂	香	9

☗ pieces in hand: 歩歩歩
N-77
☖ pieces in hand: 歩歩

9	8	7	6	5	4	3	2	1
香	桂	銀	金	王		銀	桂	香	1
						金			2
歩		歩	歩	歩	歩	角		歩	3
						飛			4
									5
	飛	歩							6
歩		桂	歩	歩	歩	歩		歩	7
	銀	金							8
香				玉	金	銀	桂	香	9

☗ pieces in hand: 角 歩歩歩
P*87
☖ pieces in hand: 歩歩

9	8	7	6	5	4	3	2	1
香	桂	銀	金	王		銀	桂	香	1
						金			2
歩		歩	歩	歩	歩	角		歩	3
						飛			4
									5
	飛	歩							6
歩	歩		歩	歩	歩	歩		歩	7
	銀	金							8
香	桂			玉	金	銀	桂	香	9

☗ pieces in hand: 角 歩歩
S-87
☖ pieces in hand: 歩歩

9	8	7	6	5	4	3	2	1
香	桂	銀	金	王		銀	桂	香	1
						金			2
歩		歩	歩	歩	歩	角		歩	3
						飛			4
									5
	飛	歩							6
歩	銀		歩	歩	歩	歩		歩	7
		金							8
香	桂			玉	金	銀	桂	香	9

☗ pieces in hand: 角 歩歩歩

== ☗10.B*77 ==
Bishop drop
up to move 20
☖ pieces in hand: 歩歩

9	8	7	6	5	4	3	2	1
香	桂	銀	金	王		銀	桂	香	1
						金			2
歩		歩	歩	歩	歩	角		歩	3
						飛			4
									5
	飛	歩							6
歩		角	歩	歩	歩	歩		歩	7
	銀	金							8
香	桂			玉	金	銀	桂	香	9

☗ pieces in hand: 歩歩歩
10.B*77

10.B*77. Black can respond by dropping a bishop to 77 simultaneously blocking White's dual attack on Black's silver on 88 and attacking White's rook on 86.

Bishop trade
up to move 21
☖ pieces in hand: 角 歩歩

9	8	7	6	5	4	3	2	1
香	桂	銀	金	王		銀	桂	香	1
						金			2
歩		歩	歩	歩	歩			歩	3
						飛			4
									5
	飛	歩							6
歩		馬	歩	歩	歩	歩		歩	7
	銀	金							8
香	桂			玉	金	銀	桂	香	9

☗ pieces in hand: 歩歩歩
10...Bx77
Knight recapture
up to move 22
☖ pieces in hand: 角 歩歩

9	8	7	6	5	4	3	2	1
香	桂	銀	金	王		銀	桂	香	1
						金			2
歩		歩	歩	歩	歩			歩	3
						飛			4
									5
	飛	歩							6
歩		桂	歩	歩	歩	歩		歩	7
	銀	金							8
香				玉	金	銀	桂	香	9

☗ pieces in hand: 角 歩歩歩
11.Nx77

10...Bx77. However, White can simply trade bishops again checking Black's king.

From this position, the other options of either retreating the rook back to White's camp (10...R-82) or taking Black's side pawn (10...Rx76) aiming for deployment to the second file (...R-26) are less effective (although safer).

11.Nx77. Black is forced to capture the bishop with their knight.

Recapturing with their silver (11.Sx77) would allow White to capture their knight, promote their rook as well as checking their king (11...Rx89+), and the even worse option of recapturing with their gold (11.Gx77) would allow White to capture their silver on 88 with White's rook which would promote to a dragon (11...Rx88+) as well having the gold on 77 where it cannot effectively defend the king.

Note that this position after 11.Nx77 is similar to the Black's 10.Nx77 response (shown in the following section) except that White's bishop is now in hand where it can be utilized more effectively.

Bishop Drop
up to move 22
☖ pieces in hand: 歩歩

9	8	7	6	5	4	3	2	1
香	桂	銀	金	王		銀	桂	香	1
						金			2
歩		歩	歩	歩	歩			歩	3
						飛			4
									5
	飛	歩							6
歩		桂	歩	歩	歩	歩		歩	7
	銀	金							8
香	角			玉	金	銀	桂	香	9

☗ pieces in hand: 角 歩歩歩
11...B*89

11...B*89. White then drops their bishop threatening to capture Black's gold on 78 which is defending the 88-silver and promoting to a horse.

=== ☗12.K-68 ===
King-68
up to move 23
☖ pieces in hand: 歩歩

9	8	7	6	5	4	3	2	1
香	桂	銀	金	王		銀	桂	香	1
						金			2
歩		歩	歩	歩	歩			歩	3
						飛			4
									5
	飛	歩							6
歩		桂	歩	歩	歩	歩		歩	7
	銀	金	玉						8
香	角				金	銀	桂	香	9

☗ pieces in hand: 角 歩歩歩
12.K-68

Gold Sacrifice
up to move 26
☖ pieces in hand: 歩歩

9	8	7	6	5	4	3	2	1
香	桂	銀	金	王		銀	桂	香	1
						金			2
歩		歩	歩	歩	歩			歩	3
						飛			4
									5
	飛	歩							6
歩		桂	歩	歩	歩	歩		歩	7
	銀	玉	金						8
香					金	銀	桂	香	9

☗ pieces in hand: 角角 歩歩歩
12...Bx78+
13. Kx78 G*68

12.K-68. Black's king moves to 68 in order to protect their gold.

This is the move that White is hoping for. From here, White can continue to attack forcefully. A safer alternative is for Black to attack White's rook with 12.S-78. (See §☗12.S-87 below.)

12...Bx78+ 13.Kx78. White trades their bishop for the gold forcing White's king to move to 78.

13...G*68. White drops their newly obtained gold in hand to 68 in a sacrifice attack.

==== ☗14.Kx68 ====
Rook Promotion
up to move 28
☖ pieces in hand: 歩歩

9	8	7	6	5	4	3	2	1
香	桂	銀	金	王		銀	桂	香	1
						金			2
歩		歩	歩	歩	歩			歩	3
						飛			4
									5
		歩							6
歩		桂	歩	歩	歩	歩		歩	7
	龍		玉						8
香					金	銀	桂	香	9

☗ pieces in hand: 角角 金 歩歩歩
14.Kx68 Rx88+

14.Kx68. King is forced to take the gold.

14...Rx88+. White's rook captures the silver and promotes checking the king.

===== ☗15.K-59 =====
up to move 29
☖ pieces in hand: 銀 歩歩

9	8	7	6	5	4	3	2	1
香	桂	銀	金	王		銀	桂	香	1
						金			2
歩		歩	歩	歩	歩			歩	3
						飛			4
									5
		歩							6
歩		桂	歩	歩	歩	歩		歩	7
	龍								8
香				玉	金	銀	桂	香	9

☗ pieces in hand: 角角 金 歩歩歩
15.K-59

up to move 31
☖ pieces in hand: 歩歩

9	8	7	6	5	4	3	2	1
香	桂	銀	金	王		銀	桂	香	1
						金			2
歩		歩	歩	歩	歩			歩	3
						飛			4
									5
		歩							6
歩		桂	歩	歩	歩	歩		歩	7
	龍		銀		玉				8
香					金	銀	桂	香	9

☗ pieces in hand: 角角 金 歩歩歩
15...S*68
16.K-48

up to move 34
☖ pieces in hand: 桂 歩歩

9	8	7	6	5	4	3	2	1
香	桂	銀	金	王		銀	桂	香	1
						金			2
歩		歩	歩	歩	歩			歩	3
						飛			4
									5
		歩							6
歩			全	歩	歩	歩		歩	7
	龍			金	玉				8
香					金	銀	桂	香	9

☗ pieces in hand: 角角 歩歩歩
16...Sx77+
17.G*58 +Sx67
up to move 35
☖ pieces in hand: 桂 歩歩

9	8	7	6	5	4	3	2	1
香	桂	銀	金	王		銀	桂	香	1
						金			2
歩		歩	歩	歩	歩			歩	3
						飛			4
				角					5
		歩							6
歩			全	歩	歩	歩		歩	7
	龍			金	玉				8
香					金	銀	桂	香	9

☗ pieces in hand: 角 歩歩歩
18.B*55

up to move 36
☖ pieces in hand: 歩歩

9	8	7	6	5	4	3	2	1
香	桂	銀	金	王		銀	桂	香	1
						金			2
歩		歩	歩	歩	歩			歩	3
						飛			4
				角					5
		歩	桂						6
歩			全	歩	歩	歩		歩	7
	龍			金	玉				8
香					金	銀	桂	香	9

☗ pieces in hand: 角 歩歩歩
18...N*66
up to move 37
☖ pieces in hand: 歩歩

9	8	7	6	5	4	3	2	1
香	桂	銀	金	王		銀	桂	香	1
						金			2
歩		歩	歩	歩	歩			歩	3
						飛			4
				角					5
		歩	桂						6
歩			全	歩	歩	歩		歩	7
	龍		歩	金	玉				8
香					金	銀	桂	香	9

☗ pieces in hand: 角 歩歩
19.P*68

up to move 40
☖ pieces in hand: 金 香 歩歩

9	8	7	6	5	4	3	2	1
香	桂	銀	金	王		銀	桂	香	1
						金			2
歩		歩	歩	歩	歩			歩	3
						飛			4
				角					5
		歩	桂						6
歩				歩	歩	歩		歩	7
			歩	金	玉				8
龍						銀	桂	香	9

☗ pieces in hand: 角 銀 歩歩
19...+Sx58
20. Gx58 +Rx99
up to move 44
☖ pieces in hand: 金金 香 歩歩

9	8	7	6	5	4	3	2	1
香	桂	銀	金	王		銀	桂	香	1
						金			2
歩		歩	歩	歩	歩			歩	3
						飛			4
				角					5
		歩							6
歩				歩	歩	歩		歩	7
			歩	銀	玉				8
	龍					銀	桂	香	9

☗ pieces in hand: 角 桂 歩歩
21.S*49 Nx58+
22.Sx58 +R-89

15.K-59. King runs out of the line of White's promoted rook to 59.

K-59 is a poor choice since White will continue an even stronger attack.

After 15...S*68 16.K-48 Sx77+ 17.G*58 +Sx67 18.B*55 N*66 19.P*68 +Sx58 20.Gx58 +Rx99 21.S*49 Nx58+ 22.Sx58 +R-89, Black is in a better position.

If Black attacks White's rook with 23.B*67, White can remain on the Black's back rank with 23...+R-79. If 23.Bx11+ or P*22, White can attack Black's knight with 23...P*28. If Black attack's White's gold with 23.N*24, then White can still defend with 23...G*33.

===== ☗15.G*78 =====
Gold Blocks
up to move 29
☖ pieces in hand: 銀 歩歩

9	8	7	6	5	4	3	2	1
香	桂	銀	金	王		銀	桂	香	1
						金			2
歩		歩	歩	歩	歩			歩	3
						飛			4
									5
		歩							6
歩		桂	歩	歩	歩	歩		歩	7
	龍	金	玉						8
香					金	銀	桂	香	9

☗ pieces in hand: 角角 歩歩歩
15.G*78

Gold Blocks
up to move 29
☖ pieces in hand: 銀 香 歩歩

9	8	7	6	5	4	3	2	1
香	桂	銀	金	王		銀	桂	香	1
						金			2
歩		歩	歩	歩	歩			歩	3
						飛			4
									5
		歩							6
歩		桂	歩	歩	歩	歩		歩	7
		金	玉						8
龍					金	銀	桂	香	9

☗ pieces in hand: 角角 歩歩歩
15...+Rx99

15.G*78. Black drops a gold to 78 blocking the promoted rook's attack. This is a better choice than 15.K-59.

15...+Rx99. White will capture the lance also attacking Black's gold on 49.

=== ☗12.S-87 ===
Silver Attacks Rook
up to move 23
☖ pieces in hand: 歩歩

9	8	7	6	5	4	3	2	1
香	桂	銀	金	王		銀	桂	香	1
						金			2
歩		歩	歩	歩	歩			歩	3
						飛			4
									5
	飛	歩							6
歩	銀	桂	歩	歩	歩	歩		歩	7
		金							8
香	角			玉	金	銀	桂	香	9

☗ pieces in hand: 角 歩歩歩
12.S-87

== ☗10.N-77 ==
Knight block
up to move 20
☖ pieces in hand: 歩歩

9	8	7	6	5	4	3	2	1
香	桂	銀	金	王		銀	桂	香	1
						金			2
歩		歩	歩	歩	歩	角		歩	3
						飛			4
									5
	飛	歩							6
歩		桂	歩	歩	歩	歩		歩	7
	銀	金							8
香				玉	金	銀	桂	香	9

☗ pieces in hand: 角 歩歩歩
10.N-77

This is viewed as the Black's best response to White's attack by professional player 飯島栄治.

== ☗10.P*87 ==
Pawn drop
up to move 20
☖ pieces in hand: 歩歩

9	8	7	6	5	4	3	2	1
香	桂	銀	金	王		銀	桂	香	1
						金			2
歩		歩	歩	歩	歩	角		歩	3
						飛			4
									5
	飛	歩							6
歩	歩		歩	歩	歩	歩		歩	7
	銀	金							8
香	桂			玉	金	銀	桂	香	9

☗ pieces in hand: 角 歩歩
10.P*87

== ☗10.S-87 ==
Silver attacks rook
up to move 20
☖ pieces in hand: 歩歩

9	8	7	6	5	4	3	2	1
香	桂	銀	金	王		銀	桂	香	1
						金			2
歩		歩	歩	歩	歩	角		歩	3
						飛			4
									5
	飛	歩							6
歩	銀		歩	歩	歩	歩		歩	7
		金							8
香	桂			玉	金	銀	桂	香	9

☗ pieces in hand: 角 歩歩歩
10.S-87

== Comparison with Bishop-33 variation position ==
B*33 board position
☖ pieces in hand: 歩歩

9	8	7	6	5	4	3	2	1
香	桂	銀	金	王		銀	桂	香	1
						金			2
歩		歩	歩	歩	歩	角		歩	3
						飛			4
									5
	飛	歩							6
歩			歩	歩	歩	歩		歩	7
	銀	金							8
香	桂			玉	金	銀	桂	香	9

☗ pieces in hand: 角 歩歩歩
B-33 board position
☖ pieces in hand: 歩歩

9	8	7	6	5	4	3	2	1
香	桂	銀	金	王		銀	桂	香	1
						金			2
歩		歩	歩	歩	歩	角		歩	3
						飛			4
									5
	飛	歩							6
歩			歩	歩	歩	歩		歩	7
	角	金							8
香	桂	銀		玉	金	銀	桂	香	9

☗ pieces in hand: 歩歩歩

This Rapid Attack B*33 variation is not to be confused with the more common B-33 slow game variation that does not trade the bishops first.

Once White drops the bishop to 33, White's position is identical to the White's position in the B-33 variation. However, Black's formation differs in that Black has a bishop in hand and their left silver is on the 88 square instead of 79 as in the B-33 variation.

== See also ==
- Side Pawn Capture
- Static Rook

== Bibliography ==
- 飯島, 栄治. 2014. 横歩取り超急戦のすべて. マイナビ
- "横歩取り急戦のすべて: 横歩取り裏定跡の入り口". 飯島栄治の将棋講座. Episode 1. 2015. 銀河将棋チャンネル – via Niconico. (in Japanese)
- "横歩取り急戦のすべて: △3三角戦法 後手の狙い". 飯島栄治の将棋講座. Episode 2. 2015. 銀河将棋チャンネル – via Niconico. (in Japanese)
- "横歩取り急戦のすべて: △3三角戦法 先手の対応 (1)". 飯島栄治の将棋講座. Episode 3. 2015. 銀河将棋チャンネル – via Niconico. (in Japanese)
- "横歩取り急戦のすべて: △3三角戦法 先手の対応 (2)". 飯島栄治の将棋講座. Episode 4. 2015. 銀河将棋チャンネル – via Niconico. (in Japanese)
- "横歩取り急戦のすべて: △3三角戦法 先手の最善策". 飯島栄治の将棋講座. Episode 5. 2015. 銀河将棋チャンネル – via Niconico. (in Japanese)
