= Side Pawn Capture, Bishop*45 =

B*45 variation
☖ pieces in hand: 歩

9	8	7	6	5	4	3	2	1
香	桂	銀	金	王		銀	桂	香	1
						金			2
歩		歩	歩	歩	歩			歩	3
						飛			4
					角				5
	飛	歩							6
歩			歩	歩	歩	歩		歩	7
	銀	金					銀		8
香	桂			玉	金		桂	香	9

☗ pieces in hand: 角 歩歩歩歩

In shogi, Side Pawn Capture, Bishop*45 variation or Side Pawn B*4e (横歩取り☖4五角 yokofudori yon-go kaku) is a Rapid Attack Side Pawn Capture variation in which White drops their bishop on the 45 square after the bishops are traded attacking Black's rook.

== Rapid Attack development ==
Rapid Attack Variation
up to move 17
☖ pieces in hand: 角 歩歩

9	8	7	6	5	4	3	2	1
香	桂	銀	金	王		銀	桂	香	1
						金			2
歩		歩	歩	歩	歩			歩	3
						飛			4
									5
	飛	歩							6
歩			歩	歩	歩	歩		歩	7
	銀	金							8
香	桂			玉	金	銀	桂	香	9

☗ pieces in hand: 角 歩歩歩

The ☖Bishop*45 Side Pawn variation is one of the Rapid Attack (急戦 kyūsen) subvariations of Side Pawn Capture that starts with bishop trade initiated by White (that is, 8...Bx88+ 9.Sx88). It is named after the bishop drop position – the 45 square – that White makes three moves after the bishop trade. This Side Pawn Capture substrategy was popular in the early 1980s. Much of the theory was advanced from the games (in 1978–1979) and analysis of Koji Tanigawa. After much research, this variation is thought to be unsound at the professional level since perfect play by Black leads to an unfavorable position for White. However, at the amateur level, the complex variation may be difficult for both sides to navigate giving winning chances for either player.

The position is reached by the following the Side Pawn Capture opening with 1.P-76 P-34 2.P-26 P-84 3.P-25 P-85 4.G-78 G-34 5.P-24 Px24 6.Rx24 P-86 7.Px86 Rx86 8.Rx34 and, subsequently, veering into the Rapid Attack lines with 8...Bx88+ 9.Sx88 to reach the position shown in the adjacent digram. (See: Side Pawn Capture for discussion of these preceding moves, especially §White's bishop trade variations.)

☖B*45
up to move 18
☖ pieces in hand: 角 歩

9	8	7	6	5	4	3	2	1
香	桂	銀	金	王		銀	桂	香	1
						金			2
歩		歩	歩	歩	歩			歩	3
						飛			4
									5
	飛	歩							6
歩			歩	歩	歩	歩		歩	7
	銀	金					歩		8
香	桂			玉	金	銀	桂	香	9

☗ pieces in hand: 角 歩歩歩
9...P*28

9...P*28. The variation starts with this move.

== Main line: ☗10.Sx28 ==
☖B*45
up to move 19
☖ pieces in hand: 角 歩

9	8	7	6	5	4	3	2	1
香	桂	銀	金	王		銀	桂	香	1
						金			2
歩		歩	歩	歩	歩			歩	3
						飛			4
									5
	飛	歩							6
歩			歩	歩	歩	歩		歩	7
	銀	金					銀		8
香	桂			玉	金		桂	香	9

☗ pieces in hand: 角 歩歩歩歩

10.Sx28.

☖B*45
up to move 20
☖ pieces in hand: 歩

9	8	7	6	5	4	3	2	1
香	桂	銀	金	王		銀	桂	香	1
						金			2
歩		歩	歩	歩	歩			歩	3
						飛			4
					角				5
	飛	歩							6
歩			歩	歩	歩	歩		歩	7
	銀	金					銀		8
香	桂			玉	金		桂	香	9

☗ pieces in hand: 角 歩歩歩歩

10...B*45.

=== ☗11.R-24 ===
☖B*45
up to move 21
☖ pieces in hand: 歩

9	8	7	6	5	4	3	2	1
香	桂	銀	金	王		銀	桂	香	1
						金			2
歩		歩	歩	歩	歩			歩	3
							飛		4
					角				5
	飛	歩							6
歩			歩	歩	歩	歩		歩	7
	銀	金					銀		8
香	桂			玉	金		桂	香	9

☗ pieces in hand: 角 歩歩歩歩
11.R-24

11.R-24. Considered the best reply for Black.

==== ☖11...P*23 ====
☖B*45
up to move 22
☖ pieces in hand: –

9	8	7	6	5	4	3	2	1
香	桂	銀	金	王		銀	桂	香	1
						金			2
歩		歩	歩	歩	歩		歩	歩	3
							飛		4
					角				5
	飛	歩							6
歩			歩	歩	歩	歩		歩	7
	銀	金					銀		8
香	桂			玉	金		桂	香	9

☗ pieces in hand: 角 歩歩歩歩
11...P*23

===== ☗12.B*77 =====
☖B*45
up to move 23
☖ pieces in hand: –

9	8	7	6	5	4	3	2	1
香	桂	銀	金	王		銀	桂	香	1
						金			2
歩		歩	歩	歩	歩		歩	歩	3
							飛		4
					角				5
	飛	歩							6
歩		角	歩	歩	歩	歩		歩	7
	銀	金					銀		8
香	桂			玉	金		桂	香	9

☗ pieces in hand: 歩歩歩歩
12.B*77
☖B*45
up to move 27
☖ pieces in hand: 飛 銀

9	8	7	6	5	4	3	2	1
香	桂	銀	金	王		銀	桂	馬	1
						金			2
歩		歩	歩	歩	歩			歩	3
							歩		4
					角				5
		歩							6
歩			歩	歩	歩	歩		歩	7
		金					銀		8
香	桂			玉	金		桂	香	9

☗ pieces in hand: 角 香 歩歩歩歩
12...Rx88+ 13.Bx88 Px24 14.Bx11+

====== ☖14...N-33 ======
☖B*45
up to move 28
☖ pieces in hand: 飛 銀

9	8	7	6	5	4	3	2	1
香	桂	銀	金	王		銀		馬	1
						金			2
歩		歩	歩	歩	歩	桂		歩	3
							歩		4
					角				5
		歩							6
歩			歩	歩	歩	歩		歩	7
		金					銀		8
香	桂			玉	金		桂	香	9

☗ pieces in hand: 角 香 歩歩歩歩
14...N-33

=== ☗11.B*77 ===
☖B*45
up to move 21
☖ pieces in hand: 歩

9	8	7	6	5	4	3	2	1
香	桂	銀	金	王		銀	桂	香	1
						金			2
歩		歩	歩	歩	歩			歩	3
						飛			4
					角				5
	飛	歩							6
歩		角	歩	歩	歩	歩		歩	7
	銀	金					銀		8
香	桂			玉	金		桂	香	9

☗ pieces in hand: 歩歩歩歩
11.B*77

11.B*77. The old joseki move but now considered not as strong as 11.R-24.

=== ☗11.R-35 ===
☖B*45
up to move 21
☖ pieces in hand: 歩

9	8	7	6	5	4	3	2	1
香	桂	銀	金	王		銀	桂	香	1
						金			2
歩		歩	歩	歩	歩			歩	3
									4
					角	飛			5
	飛	歩							6
歩			歩	歩	歩	歩		歩	7
	銀	金					銀		8
香	桂			玉	金		桂	香	9

☗ pieces in hand: 角 歩歩歩歩
11.R-35

=== ☗11.P*87 ===
☖B*45
up to move 21
☖ pieces in hand: 歩

9	8	7	6	5	4	3	2	1
香	桂	銀	金	王		銀	桂	香	1
						金			2
歩		歩	歩	歩	歩			歩	3
						飛			4
					角				5
	飛	歩							6
歩	歩		歩	歩	歩	歩		歩	7
	銀	金					銀		8
香	桂			玉	金		桂	香	9

☗ pieces in hand: 角 歩歩歩
11.P*87

== ☗10.B*77 ==
☖B*45
up to move 19
☖ pieces in hand: 角 歩

9	8	7	6	5	4	3	2	1
香	桂	銀	金	王		銀	桂	香	1
						金			2
歩		歩	歩	歩	歩			歩	3
						飛			4
									5
	飛	歩							6
歩		角	歩	歩	歩	歩		歩	7
	銀	金					歩		8
香	桂			玉	金	銀	桂	香	9

☗ pieces in hand: 歩歩歩
10.B*77

=== ☖10...Rx88+ ===
☖B*45
up to move 20
☖ pieces in hand: 飛 角 歩

9	8	7	6	5	4	3	2	1
香	桂	銀	金	王		銀	桂	香	1
						金			2
歩		歩	歩	歩	歩			歩	3
						飛			4
									5
		歩							6
歩		角	歩	歩	歩	歩		歩	7
	龍	金					歩		8
香	桂			玉	金	銀	桂	香	9

☗ pieces in hand: 歩歩歩
10...Rx88+

=== ☖10...Rx76 ===
☖B*45
up to move 20
☖ pieces in hand: 角 歩

9	8	7	6	5	4	3	2	1
香	桂	銀	金	王		銀	桂	香	1
						金			2
歩		歩	歩	歩	歩			歩	3
						飛			4
									5
		飛							6
歩		角	歩	歩	歩	歩		歩	7
	銀	金					歩		8
香	桂			玉	金	銀	桂	香	9

☗ pieces in hand: 歩歩歩
10...Rx76

== Without ☖9...P*28 ==
☖B*45
up to move 18
☖ pieces in hand: 歩

9	8	7	6	5	4	3	2	1
香	桂	銀	金	王		銀	桂	香	1
						金			2
歩		歩	歩	歩	歩			歩	3
						飛			4
					角				5
	飛	歩							6
歩			歩	歩	歩	歩		歩	7
	銀	金							8
香	桂			玉	金	銀	桂	香	9

☗ pieces in hand: 角 歩歩歩
9...B*45

9...B*45. Dropping the bishop to 45 without playing 9...P*28 10.Sx28 first is considered a blunder for White.

== See also ==
- Side Pawn Capture
- Double Side Pawn Capture
- Side Pawn Capture Bishop-33
