= Bishop Exchange, Wrong Diagonal Bishop =

Wrong Diagonal Bishop
☖ pieces in hand: 角

9	8	7	6	5	4	3	2	1
香	桂	銀	金	王			桂	香	1
	飛					金	銀		2
歩		歩	歩	歩	歩		歩	歩	3
						歩			4
	歩				角		歩		5
		歩							6
歩	歩	銀	歩	歩	歩	歩		歩	7
							飛		8
香	桂		金	玉	金	銀	桂	香	9

☗ pieces in hand: –

Bishop Exchange Wrong Diagonal Bishop (角換わり筋違い角 kakugawari suji chigai kaku) is a variation of the Bishop Exchange (Double Static Rook) opening that has an early bishop drop on the 45 square.

This variation is not to be confused with the Primitive Wrong Diagonal Bishop opening, which is characterized by dropping the bishop to 45 (or 65 for White) even earlier.

== Development ==
Bishop Exchange variant 1
☖ pieces in hand: 角

9	8	7	6	5	4	3	2	1
香	桂	銀	金	王			桂	香	1
	飛					金	銀		2
歩		歩	歩	歩	歩		歩	歩	3
						歩			4
	歩				角		歩		5
		歩							6
歩	歩	銀	歩	歩	歩	歩		歩	7
							飛		8
香	桂		金	玉	金	銀	桂	香	9

☗ pieces in hand: –
Classic Bishop Exchange form with rook pawn advanced to 25
Bishop Exchange variant 2
☖ pieces in hand: 角

9	8	7	6	5	4	3	2	1
香	桂	銀	金	王	金		桂	香	1
	飛						銀		2
歩		歩	歩	歩	歩		歩	歩	3
						歩			4
	歩				角				5
		歩					歩		6
歩	歩	銀	歩	歩	歩	歩		歩	7
							飛		8
香	桂		金	玉	金	銀	桂	香	9

☗ pieces in hand: –
Modern Bishop Exchange with delayed rook pawn push, early bishop trade
Bishop Exchange variant 3
☖ pieces in hand: 角

9	8	7	6	5	4	3	2	1
香	桂	銀	金	王			桂	香	1
	飛				銀	金			2
歩		歩	歩	歩	歩		歩	歩	3
						歩			4
	歩				角				5
		歩					歩		6
歩	歩	銀	歩	歩	歩	歩		歩	7
		金					飛		8
香	桂			玉	金	銀	桂	香	9

☗ pieces in hand: –
Modern Bishop Exchange with delayed rook pawn push and gold development

The Wrong Diagonal Bishop variation of the Bishop Exchange opening was most popular during the 1950s and was often played by Yasuharu Ōyama and Masao Tsukada.

=== Classic Bishop Exchange ===
Classic Bishop Exchange
☖ pieces in hand: 角

9	8	7	6	5	4	3	2	1
香	桂	銀	金	王		銀	桂	香	1
	飛					金	角		2
歩		歩	歩	歩	歩		歩	歩	3
						歩			4
	歩						歩		5
		歩							6
歩	歩	角	歩	歩	歩	歩		歩	7
	銀						飛		8
香	桂		金	玉	金	銀	桂	香	9

☗ pieces in hand: –
Classic Bishop Exchange
☖ pieces in hand: 角

9	8	7	6	5	4	3	2	1
香	桂	銀	金	王		銀	桂	香	1
	飛					金			2
歩		歩	歩	歩	歩		歩	歩	3
						歩			4
	歩						歩		5
		歩							6
歩	歩	馬	歩	歩	歩	歩		歩	7
	銀						飛		8
香	桂		金	玉	金	銀	桂	香	9

☗ pieces in hand: –

The Classic Bishop Exchange has Black's rook pawn advanced all the way to the middle rank 5 and White has defended the second file with a gold development. White initiates the standard bishop trade, and then, after Black captures the promoted bishop and White moves their silver up to defend the second file is when the Wrong Diagonal Bishop variation starts.

Classic Bishop Exchange
☖ pieces in hand: 角

9	8	7	6	5	4	3	2	1
香	桂	銀	金	王			桂	香	1
	飛					金	銀		2
歩		歩	歩	歩	歩		歩	歩	3
						歩			4
	歩						歩		5
		歩							6
歩	歩	銀	歩	歩	歩	歩		歩	7
							飛		8
香	桂		金	玉	金	銀	桂	香	9

☗ pieces in hand: 角
Wrong Diagonal
☖ pieces in hand: 角

9	8	7	6	5	4	3	2	1
香	桂	銀	金	王			桂	香	1
	飛					金	銀		2
歩		歩	歩	歩	歩		歩	歩	3
						歩			4
	歩				角		歩		5
		歩							6
歩	歩	銀	歩	歩	歩	歩		歩	7
							飛		8
香	桂		金	玉	金	銀	桂	香	9

☗ pieces in hand: –

Black drops the bishop forking White's two pawns.

Thus, the initial moves of the variation are actually the same as the other Bishop Exchange variations up until the moment of the player's bishop drop on the wrong diagonal.

Wrong Diagonal
☖ pieces in hand: 角

9	8	7	6	5	4	3	2	1
香	桂		金	王			桂	香	1
	飛		銀			金	銀		2
歩		歩	歩	歩	歩		歩	歩	3
						角			4
	歩						歩		5
		歩							6
歩	歩	銀	歩	歩	歩	歩		歩	7
							飛		8
香	桂		金	玉	金	銀	桂	香	9

☗ pieces in hand: –
Wrong Diagonal
☖ pieces in hand: 角

9	8	7	6	5	4	3	2	1
香	桂		金	王			桂	香	1
	飛		銀			金			2
歩		歩	歩	歩	歩	銀	歩	歩	3
									4
	歩						歩		5
		歩		角					6
歩	歩	銀	歩	歩	歩	歩		歩	7
							飛		8
香	桂		金	玉	金	銀	桂	香	9

☗ pieces in hand: –

White defends the sixth and fifth file pawns. Black captures White's third file pawn. Since White's right gold has already by developed so that it protects the fourth and second file pawns, White can use their silver now to attack Black's bishop and push it back to the central file.

At this point, Black has two options of either left side bishop development or right side bishop development.

== See also ==
- Bishop Exchange
- Wrong Diagonal Bishop
- Static Rook

== Bibliography ==
- Fairbairn, John (1980). "The wrong-diagonal bishop". Shogi (23): 18.
- Hodges, George (ed.). "The wrong diagonal 角 part one". Shogi (57): 6–8.
- Hodges, George, ed. (1986). "The wrong diagonal 角 part six". Shogi (62). Translated by Murphy, David: 13–14, 16.
- Hosking, Tony (1996). The art of shogi. The Shogi Foundation. ISBN 978-0-95310-890-9.
- Kimura, Yoshio (1986). "The wrong diagonal 角 part seven". Shogi (63): 6–7.
- Kimura, Yoshio (1986). "The wrong diagonal 角 part eight". Shogi (64). Translated by Murphy, David: 13–14.
- Kimura, Yoshio (1987). "The wrong diagonal 角 part nine". Shogi (65). Translated by Murphy, David: 13–15.
- Kimura, Yoshio (1987). "The wrong diagonal 角 part ten". Shogi (66). Translated by Murphy, David: 14–16.
- Kimura, Yoshio (1987). "The wrong diagonal 角 part eleven". Shogi (67). Translated by Murphy, David: 7–9.
- Kimura, Yoshio (1987). "The wrong diagonal 角 part twelve". Shogi (68). Translated by Murphy, David: 7–9.
- Kimura, Yoshio (1987). "The wrong diagonal 角 part thirteen". Shogi (69). Translated by Murphy, David: 7–9.
- Kimura, Yoshio (1987). "The wrong diagonal 角 part fourteen". Shogi (70). Translated by Murphy, David: 7–9.
- Naito, Kunio (1985). "The wrong diagonal 角 part two". Shogi (58). Translated by Fairbairn, John: 7–9.
- Naito, Kunio (1986). "The wrong diagonal 角 part three". Shogi (59). Translated by Murphy, David: 15–17.
