= Shin'ichirō Hattori =

Japanese shogi player (born 1999)

- Native name: 服部慎一郎
- Born: August 2, 1999 (age 26)
- Hometown: Toyama, Japan

Career
- Achieved professional status: April 1, 2020 (aged 20)
- Badge number: 322
- Rank: 7-dan
- Teacher: Shōdo Nakada (7-dan)
- Tournaments won: 4
- Meijin class: B1
- Ryūō class: 3

Websites
- JSA profile page

Shin'ichirō Hattori (服部 慎一郎, Hattori Shin'ichirō; August 2, 1999) is a Japanese professional shogi player ranked 7-dan.

== Early life and apprenticeship ==
Hattori was born on August 2, 1999, in Toyama, Japan. He became interested in shogi when he was a third-grade elementary school student after hearing his homeroom teacher talk about a shogi tournament for elementary school students; Hattori entered the tournament and lost, but losing made him want to study to become better. He was accepted into the Japan Shogi Association's (JSA) apprentice school at the rank of 6-kyū as a student of shogi professional Shōdo Nakada in April 2013, was promoted to the rank of apprentice professional 3-dan in October 2017 and obtained full professional status and the corresponding rank of 4-dan in April 2020 after finishing first in the 66th 3-dan League (October 2019 – March 2020) with a record of 14 wins and 4 losses. (Note: Hattori, Hiroki Taniai and women's professional Tomoka Nishiyama all finished with the same record of 14 wins and 4 losses, but Hattori and Taniai were promoted to 4-dan due to their higher initial league rankings. Hattori was awarded first place due to being the highest ranked (second) of the three, while Hattori was awarded second place due to being the next highest ranked (fourth). Nishiyama was ranked twenty-first.)

== Shogi professional ==
Hattori the 11th Kakogawa Seiryū Tournament in September 2021 by defeating Akihiro Ida 2 games to 1.

In October–November 2022, Hattori defeated Takayuki Kuroda 2 games to 1 to win the 53rd Shinjin-Ō tournament. Hattori won the tournament for a second time in October 2024 when he defeated Akihiro Takada 2 games to none to win the 55th Shinjin-Ō tournament. He became the fourth person to win the tournament three times when he defeated Asuto Saitō 2 games to 1 in the finals of the 56th Shinjin-Ō tournament in October 2025. (Note: The other three players are Hidemitsu Moriyasu, Toshiyuki Moriuchi, and Takeshi Fujii.)

Hattori's first appearance in a major title match came in June–July 2026 when he challenged Sōta Fujii for the 97th Kisei Title; Hattori lost the match 3 games to none.

=== Promotion history ===
The promotion history for Hattori is as follows.

- 6-kyū: April 2013
- 3-dan: October 2017
- 4-dan: April 1, 2020
- 5-dan: September 30, 2022
- 6-dan: April 20, 2023
- 7-dan: February 5, 2025

=== Titles and other championships ===
Hattori has appeared in one major title match but has yet to win a major title; he has, however, won four non-title tournaments.

=== Awards and honors ===
Hattori won the Japan Shogi Association's Annual Shogi Awards for "Best New Player" and "Most Games Played" for the April 2022 – March 2023 shogi year, and "Best Winning Percentage" for the April 2024 – March 2025 shogi year.
