= Asuto Saitō =

Japanese shogi player

- Native name: 斎藤明日斗
- Born: July 17, 1998 (age 27)
- Hometown: Kawasaki, Kanagawa

Career
- Achieved professional status: October 1, 2017 (aged 19)
- Badge Number: 311
- Rank: 6-dan
- Teacher: Toshio Miyata (8-dan)
- Meijin class: B2
- Ryūō class: 5

Websites
- JSA profile page

Asuto Saitō (斎藤 明日斗, Saitō Asuto; July 17, 1998) is a Japanese professional shogi player ranked 6-dan.

== Early life and apprenticeship ==
Saitō was born in Kawasaki, Kanagawa, on July 17, 1998. He learned how to play shogi from his father as a young boy before entering elementary school.

In September 2010, Saitō was accepted into the Japan Shogi Association (JSA) apprentice school as a pupil of shogi professional Toshio Miyata at the rank of 6-kyū. He was promoted to the rank of apprentice professional 3-dan in 2015, and obtained full professional status and the corresponding rank of 4-dan in October 2017 after winning the 61st 3-dan League (April 2017 – September 2017) with a record of 14 wins and 4 losses.

== Shogi professional ==
Saitō advanced to the finals of the 56th Shinjin-Ō tournament in October 2025 against Shin'ichirō Hattori but lost the best-of-three match 2 games to 1.

=== Promotion history ===
The promotion history for Saitō is as follows.

- 6-kyū: September 2010
- 3-dan: October 2015
- 4-dan: October 1, 2017
- 5-dan: January 14, 2021
- 6-dan: January 14, 2025
