= Hiroki Taniai =

Japanese shogi player (born 1994)

- Native name: 谷合廣紀
- Born: January 6, 1994 (age 32)
- Hometown: Chūō, Tokyo, Japan

Career
- Achieved professional status: April 1, 2020 (aged 26)
- Badge number: 323
- Rank: 5-dan
- Teacher: Makoto Chūza (7-dan)
- Meijin class: C2
- Ryūō class: 6

Websites
- JSA profile page

Hiroki Taniai (谷合 廣紀, Taniai Hiroki; January 6, 1994) is a Japanese professional shogi player ranked 5-dan.

== Early life and apprenticeship ==
Taniai was born on January 6, 1994, in Chūō, Tokyo. He learned how to play shogi from his grandfather and was accepted into the Japan Shogi Association's (JSA) apprentice school at the rank of 6-kyū as a student of shogi professional Makoto Chūza in September 2006. He was promoted to the rank of apprentice professional 3-dan in 2011 and obtained full professional status and the corresponding rank of 4-dan in April 2020 after finishing second to Shin'ichirō Hattori in the 66th 3-dan League (October 2019 – March 2020) with a record of 14 wins and 4 losses. (Note: Hattori, Taniai and women's professional Tomoka Nishiyama all finished with the same record of 14 wins and 4 losses, but Hattori and Taniai were promoted to 4-dan due to their higher initial league rankings. Hattori was awarded first place due to being the highest ranked (second) of the three, while Hattori was awarded second place due to being the next highest ranked (fourth). Nishiyama was ranked twenty-first.)

== Shogi professional ==
=== Promotion history ===
The promotion history for Taniai is as follows.

- 6-kyū: September 2006
- 3-dan: October 2011
- 4-dan: April 1, 2020
- 5-dan: July 10, 2025

== Yoshimoto Kyogo ==
In August 2022, Taniai entered into a talent management agreement with the Japanese entertainment conglomerate Yoshimoto Kogyo.

== Personal life ==
Taniai is a graduate of the School of Engineering, University of Tokyo. After completeing his undergraduate studies, he enrolled in the university's Graduate School of Information Science and Technology to pursue a Ph.D in information science and engineering. He is the second alumunus and the first graduate student of the university to become a professional shogi player.
