= Tatsuya Sanmaidō =

Japanese shogi player

- Native name: 三枚堂達也
- Born: July 14, 1993 (age 32)
- Hometown: Urayasu

Career
- Achieved professional status: October 1, 2013 (aged 20)
- Badge number: 294
- Rank: 7-dan
- Teacher: Kunio Naitō (9-dan)
- Tournaments won: 1
- Meijin class: C1
- Ryūō class: 3

Websites
- JSA profile page

Tatsuya Sanmaidō (三枚堂 達也, Sanmaidō Tatsuya; born July 14, 1993) is a Japanese professional shogi player ranked 7-dan.

== Early life and apprenticeship ==
Sanmaidō was born in Urayasu, Chiba, on July 14, 1993. His grandfather was an acquaintance of shogi professional Kunio Naitō, who recommended Sanmaidō learn shogi. Sanmaidō often went to practice at the Kashiwa Shogi Center to improve, and entered the Japan Shogi Association's apprentice school at the rank of 6-kyū under the guidance of Naitō in September 2004. Promoted to the rank of 3-dan in April 2013, Sanmaidō finished second in the 53rd 3-dan League with a record of 14 wins and 4 losses to obtain full professional status and the rank of 4-dan in October 2013.

== Shogi professional ==
Sanmaido defeated Taichi Takami to win the 2nd Jōshū Yamada Challenge Cup in 2017.

=== Promotion history ===
Sanmaidō's promotion history is as follows:

- 6-kyū: September 6, 2004
- 3-dan: April 2013
- 4-dan: October 1, 2013
- 5-dan: July 27, 2017
- 6-dan: November 24, 2017
- 7-dan: September 4, 2019

=== Titles and other championships ===
Sanmaidō has yet to appear in a major title match, but has won one non-title shogi tournament.
