= Makoto Chūza =

Japanese shogi player

- Native name: 中座真
- Born: February 3, 1970 (age 55)
- Hometown: Wakkanai, Hokkaido

Career
- Achieved professional status: April 1, 1996 (aged 26)
- Badge Number: 219
- Rank: 8-dan
- Retired: June 19, 2024 (aged 54)
- Teacher: Yūji Sase (Honorary 9-dan)
- Career record: 413–427 (.492)
- Notable students: Hiroki Taniai

Websites
- JSA profile page

Makoto Chūza (中座 真, Chūza Makoto; born February 3, 1970) is a Japanese retired professional shogi player who achieved the rank of 8-dan.

== Early life and apprenticeship ==
Chūza was born in Wakkanai, Hokkaido on February 3, 1970. He was accepted into the Japan Shogi Association's apprentice school at the rank of 6-kyū in November 1981 under the tutelage of shogi professional Yūji Sase, was promoted to the rank of 1-dan in 1988, and obtained full professional status and the rank of 4-dan in April 1996.

== Shogi professional ==
In May 2024, the JSA posted on its official website that Chūza had submitted his retirement papers and would be retiring from professional shogi for personal reasons upon completion his last official game for the 2024-2025 shogi season. Chūza's retirement became official on June 19, 2024, after he lost his 37th Ryūō Group 4 game to Hirotaka Nozuki. Chūza finished his career with a record of 413 wins and 427 losses for a winning percentage of 0.492.

=== Theoretical contributions ===
The Side Pawn Capture variation Chūza's Rook (中座飛車 Chūza hisha, also known the R-85 variation 横歩取り8五飛), which became a very popular strategy, is named after him.

Matsumoto vs Chūza 1997
☖ pieces in hand: 歩歩

9	8	7	6	5	4	3	2	1
香	桂	銀	金	王			桂	香	1
						金	銀		2
歩		歩	歩	歩	歩	角		歩	3
									4
	飛								5
		歩				飛			6
歩	歩		歩	歩	歩	歩		歩	7
	角	金							8
香	桂	銀		玉	金	銀	桂	香	9

☗ pieces in hand: 歩歩歩
position of Chūza's Rook

=== Promotion history ===
The promotion history for Chūza is as follows:

- 6-kyū: 1981
- 1-dan: 1988
- 4-dan: April 1, 1996
- 5-dan: August 17, 2001
- 6-dan: April 11, 2007
- 7-dan: September 20, 2007
- 8-dan: April 1, 2024
- Retired: June 19, 2024

=== Awards and honors ===
Chūza received the Japan Shogi Association's Masuda Award for his "Chūza's Rook" opening variation in 1998.

== Personal life ==
Chuza is married to retired female shogi professional Akiko Nakakura. The couple married in November 2003, and have three children.
