= Side Pawn Capture =

Side Pawn Capture
☖ pieces in hand: 歩歩

9	8	7	6	5	4	3	2	1
香	桂	銀	金	王		銀	桂	香	1
						金	角		2
歩		歩	歩	歩	歩			歩	3
						飛			4
									5
	飛	歩							6
歩			歩	歩	歩	歩		歩	7
	角	金							8
香	桂	銀		玉	金	銀	桂	香	9

☗ pieces in hand: 歩歩歩
Black's rook moves sideways from the second file to capture White's side pawn previously positioned on the 34 square.

In shogi, Side Pawn Capture (横歩取り yokofudori, also translated as Side Pawn Picker, Side Pawn Piker (Note: Side Pawn Picker is a mistranslation of the verb 取る toru "(to) capture, take, grab" whereas Piker is a typographical error of Picker found on the Shogi Wars application.) or simply 横歩 yokofu Side Pawn) is a Double Static Rook opening.

The side pawns referred to are the pawns that are advanced in order to open both players' bishop diagonal. (P34 is White's side pawn, P76 is Black's.) In this opening, this pawn is captured by an opponent's rook in a gambit move – typically, made by Black with Rx34. This is one of the few gambits in shogi. The move has the typical characteristics of gambits: Black gains material with the extra pawn but now has lost tempo as their rook is now off its original file and requires a few moves to maneuver the rook back to the second file safely, White has lost material but now has faster development including the possibility of dropping a pawn to attack on the third file later (and Black has no comparable extra pawn drop possibilities).

Additionally, while White has offered the P34 gambit pawn for capture, Black has also offered their own P76 for capture as well making this a countergambit. Usually, Black accepts the side pawn gambit while White may or may not also capture Black's side pawn depending upon the variation.

Side Pawn Capture is known for having several very sharp variations.

The term Side Pawn Capture (横歩取り) can also refer to an older unrelated joseki for a Static Rook position played against Central Rook. (See: Central Rook vs Side Pawn.)

== History ==
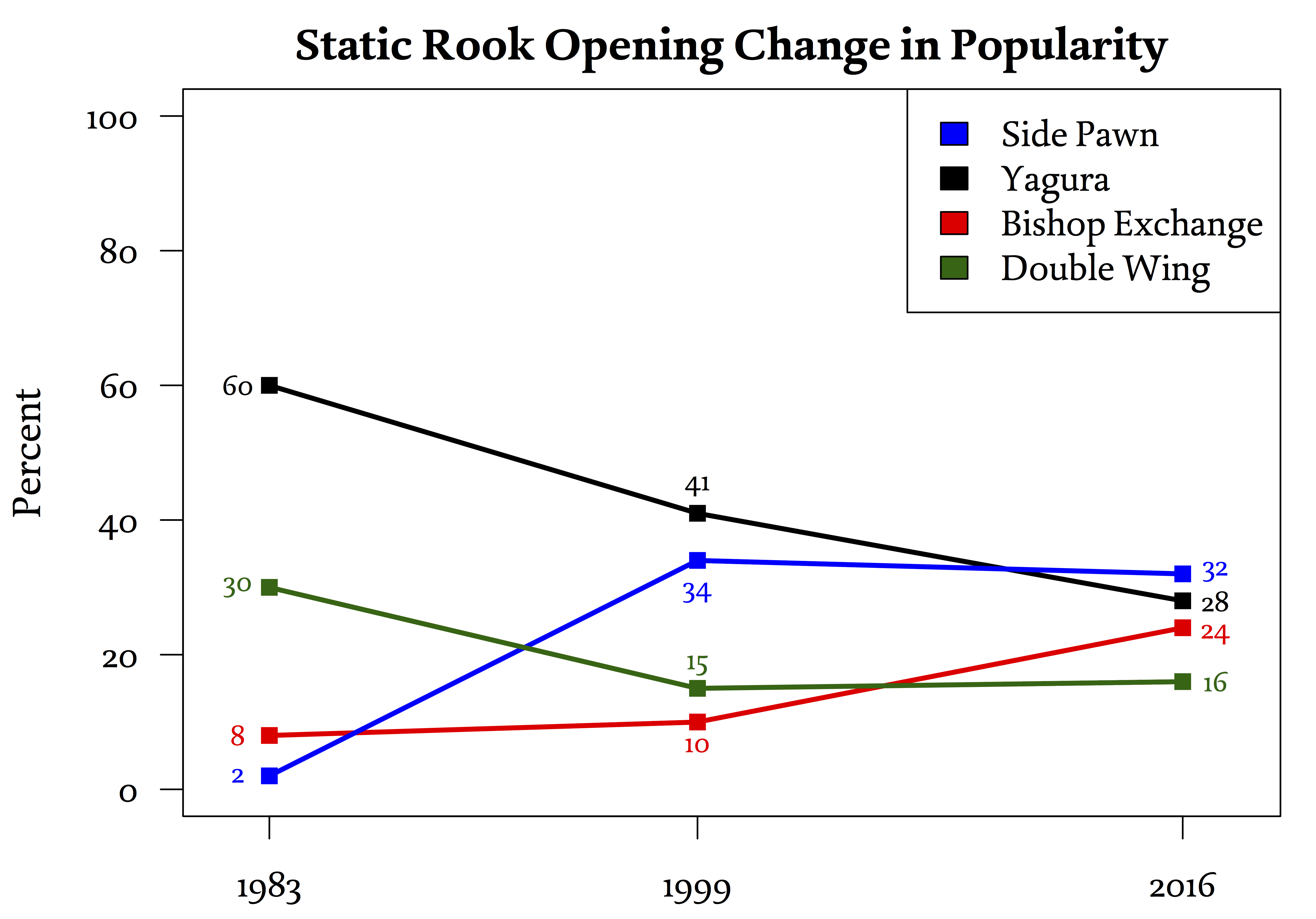
Change in popularity of Static Rook openings in professional games at three points in a 34-year period (NHK Shogi Focus: April 16, 2016)

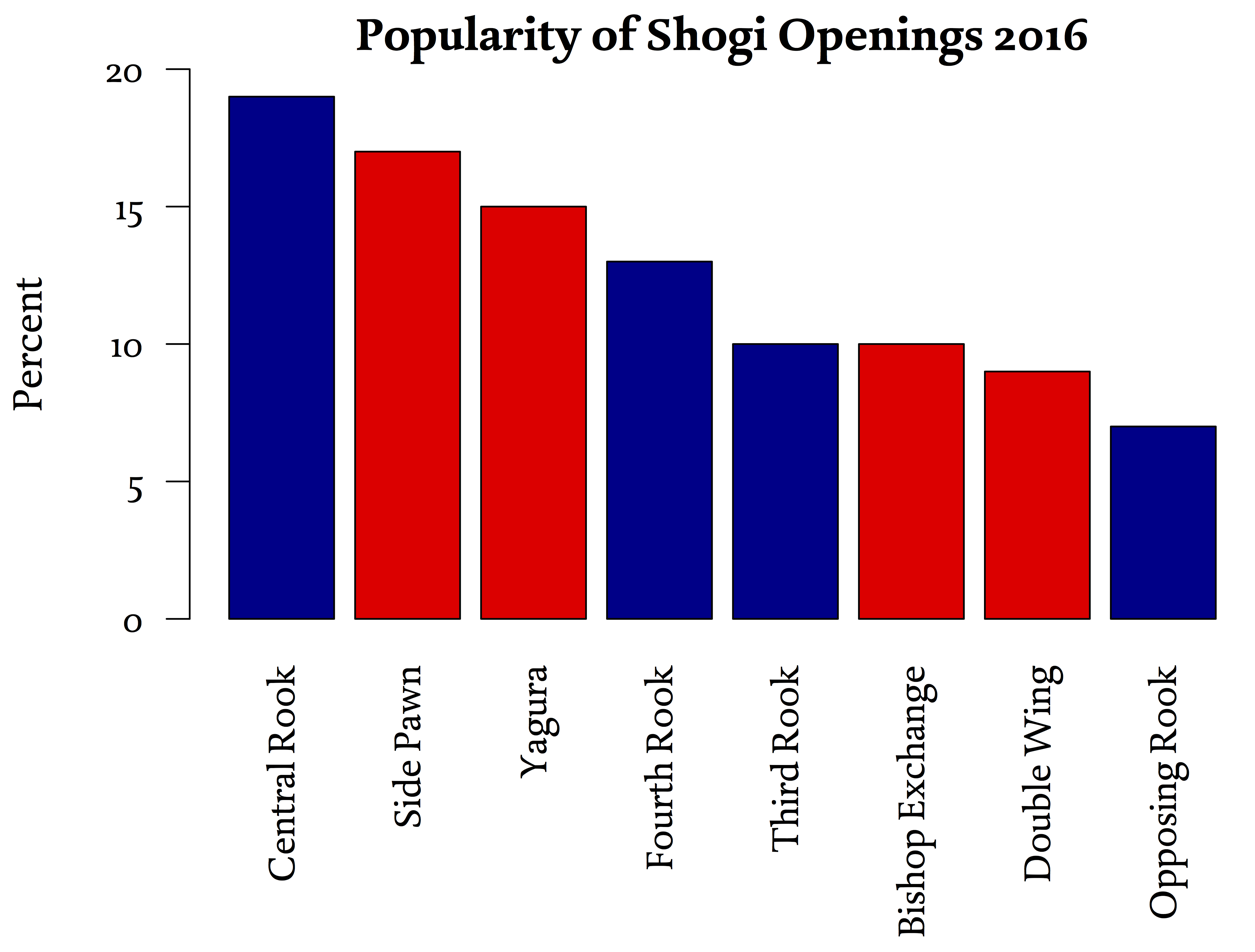
Openings used in 2016 (NHK Shogi Focus: April 16, 2016)

Although the Side Pawn opening was not very common decades ago, it has become one of the most popular Double Static Rook openings with professional players and was the second most common opening used in 2016 and the most popular Double Static Rook opening of that year.

The Side Pawn Capture idea is very old with records showing it was played already during the Edo period. Edo-period shogi master Ryūsetsu Ōhashi is thought to be the first person to write about it. Nevertheless, in between the Meiji period and the beginning of the Shōwa period (1868–1930), capturing the pawn on 34 was considered a bad move for Black, and hence the old shogi proverb "Side pawn capture means three years of trouble." In particular, it was thought at the time that although the capture was profitable in that a pawn was acquired, for Black it meant that the buildup of the formation would be slowed down, making it a bad idea.

Yoshio Kimura vs Yasujirō Kon 1930
☖ pieces in hand: 飛

9	8	7	6	5	4	3	2	1
香	桂	銀	金	王			桂	香	1
	飛								2
歩		歩	歩	歩	歩	銀		歩	3
						角			4
	歩								5
		歩							6
歩	歩	銀	歩	歩	歩	歩		歩	7
		金				銀			8
香	桂			玉	金		桂	香	9

☗ pieces in hand: 角 金 歩歩
up to move 22

This would start gradually changing in the post-war years. Shogi master (and eventual Lifetime Meijin) Yoshio Kimura would challenge this prevailing view by obtaining a very high winning record playing Side Pawn Capture, and soon the strategy became popular for Black. (The adjacent diagram shows an early Side Pawn game, which Kimura won as Black, using the ☖6...P*23 variation with a bishop trade by White and Black playing an early S-77.) Simultaneously, strategies for White began to be developed as well. Kunio Naitō actively adopted Side Pawn Capture (particularly the B-33 variation), and thanks to his superb command of the opening this variation is called Naitō's Aerial Fight. Other top shogi players to adopt Side Pawn Capture were Kunio Yonenaga, Makoto Nakahara, and Kōji Tanigawa. At the other extreme, other players disliked Side Pawn Capture. In the 1990 Ōshō game against then title holder Yoshikazu Minami, who did not usually capture the side pawn, challenger Yonenaga commented to the press "No way I'll lose against a man who doesn't capture the side pawn." Minami responded by playing Side Pawn Capture in the game.

Exceptional developments in the Side Pawn Capture opening occurred by the end of the 1980s. With the appearance in the shogi world of top players like Yoshiharu Habu, Toshiyuki Moriuchi, and Yasumitsu Satō (often called the Habu generation), investigation into the opening and subsequent middlegame strategies rapidly developed. As a result, many variations of Side Pawn Capture for Black became established.

In 1997, Makoto Chūza first demonstrated the R-85 variation, which brought a novel interruption in Side Pawn Capture theory. Since pulling White's rook back to the fifth rank (R-85) countered the up-to-then conventional strategy, professional shogi players had a lot of trouble accommodating it due to the shogi sense they had accumulated since they were children, and for a while the winning rate for White went unusually up to almost 70%. With further research into this strategy, Tadahisa Maruyama adopted successfully Side Pawn Capture when playing White in his A-class ranking matches to become a Meijin challenger in 1999 and 2000, even using the same strategy when playing White in his Meijin match.

Research has continued throughout the 21st century, and new variations have been introduced like Teruichi Aono's K-58 variation (Aono's Variation), and Yūki Sasaki's K-68 variation (Yūki's Variation).

== Initial development ==
Side Pawn Capture
up to move 1
☖ pieces in hand: –

9	8	7	6	5	4	3	2	1
香	桂	銀	金	王	金	銀	桂	香	1
	飛						角		2
歩	歩	歩	歩	歩	歩	歩	歩	歩	3
									4
									5
		歩							6
歩	歩		歩	歩	歩	歩	歩	歩	7
	角						飛		8
香	桂	銀	金	玉	金	銀	桂	香	9

☗ pieces in hand: –
Side Pawn Capture
up to move 2
☖ pieces in hand: –

9	8	7	6	5	4	3	2	1
香	桂	銀	金	王	金	銀	桂	香	1
	飛						角		2
歩	歩	歩	歩	歩	歩		歩	歩	3
						歩			4
									5
		歩							6
歩	歩		歩	歩	歩	歩	歩	歩	7
	角						飛		8
香	桂	銀	金	玉	金	銀	桂	香	9

☗ pieces in hand: –

1. P-76. Black opens their bishop diagonal

This pawn that was put forward is Black's so-called side pawn (横の歩 yoko no fu). It is termed side since White's rook may capture this pawn from the eighth file (when positioned on the 86 square) by moving sideways to the seventh file (that is, R86x76).

1... P-34. White responds by opening their bishop diagonal as well.

This is White's side pawn.

The Side Pawn opening is typically started with both players attacking each other's bishop (although transpositions with later moves are possible).

Side Pawn Capture
up to move 4
☖ pieces in hand: –

9	8	7	6	5	4	3	2	1
香	桂	銀	金	王	金	銀	桂	香	1
	飛						角		2
歩		歩	歩	歩	歩		歩	歩	3
	歩					歩			4
									5
		歩					歩		6
歩	歩		歩	歩	歩	歩		歩	7
	角						飛		8
香	桂	銀	金	玉	金	銀	桂	香	9

☗ pieces in hand: –
Side Pawn Capture
up to move 6
☖ pieces in hand: –

9	8	7	6	5	4	3	2	1
香	桂	銀	金	王	金	銀	桂	香	1
	飛						角		2
歩		歩	歩	歩	歩		歩	歩	3
						歩			4
	歩						歩		5
		歩							6
歩	歩		歩	歩	歩	歩		歩	7
	角						飛		8
香	桂	銀	金	玉	金	銀	桂	香	9

☗ pieces in hand: –

2. P-26 P-84. Both players give an early indication of choosing a Static Rook opening by advancing their rook pawns. Thus, the game will likely be a Double Static Rook opening.

3. P-25 P-85. Both continue their rook pawn advances to rank 5. Thus, the likelihood of a Double Static Rook game increases.

Furthermore, this board configuration gives a strong indication of the Side Pawn opening.

Side Pawn Capture
up to move 8
☖ pieces in hand: –

9	8	7	6	5	4	3	2	1
香	桂	銀	金	王		銀	桂	香	1
	飛					金	角		2
歩		歩	歩	歩	歩		歩	歩	3
						歩			4
	歩						歩		5
		歩							6
歩	歩		歩	歩	歩	歩		歩	7
	角	金					飛		8
香	桂	銀		玉	金	銀	桂	香	9

☗ pieces in hand: –
Side Pawn Capture
up to move 9
☖ pieces in hand: –

9	8	7	6	5	4	3	2	1
香	桂	銀	金	王		銀	桂	香	1
	飛					金	角		2
歩		歩	歩	歩	歩		歩	歩	3
						歩	歩		4
	歩								5
		歩							6
歩	歩		歩	歩	歩	歩		歩	7
	角	金					飛		8
香	桂	銀		玉	金	銀	桂	香	9

☗ pieces in hand: –

4. G-78. Black moves their left gold to the seventh file protecting the 88 square from a later possible bishop attack and protecting the 87 square in preparation for White pawn exchange on that file.

4... G-32. White mirrors Black's move for the same reasons.

Both players have symmetrical positions.

This board is highly suggestive of Side Pawn Capture. However, a Double Wing Attack opening is still possible depending on whether either player actually takes the side pawn in the subsequent moves. Furthermore, a Tempo Loss Bishop Exchange opening is also possible.

5. P-24. Black initiates a pawn trade on the second file by attacking White's pawn.

Side Pawn Capture
up to move 10
☖ pieces in hand: 歩

9	8	7	6	5	4	3	2	1
香	桂	銀	金	王		銀	桂	香	1
	飛					金	角		2
歩		歩	歩	歩	歩			歩	3
						歩	歩		4
	歩								5
		歩							6
歩	歩		歩	歩	歩	歩		歩	7
	角	金					飛		8
香	桂	銀		玉	金	銀	桂	香	9

☗ pieces in hand: –
Side Pawn Capture
up to move 11
☖ pieces in hand: 歩

9	8	7	6	5	4	3	2	1
香	桂	銀	金	王		銀	桂	香	1
	飛					金	角		2
歩		歩	歩	歩	歩			歩	3
						歩	飛		4
	歩								5
		歩							6
歩	歩		歩	歩	歩	歩		歩	7
	角	金							8
香	桂	銀		玉	金	銀	桂	香	9

☗ pieces in hand: 歩

5... Px24, 6. Rx24. Pawn trade clearing off the pawns on the second file and giving each player a pawn in hand.

Black's rook is positioned on 24 square. From this position, Black may capture White's side pawn on 34 in subsequent moves leading directly into the Side Pawn Capture opening.

=== Transpositions ===
The Side Pawn opening position above can be reached by several different move sequences, some of which are shown below.

	Black	White	Black	White	Black	White	Black	White
1.	P-26	P-84	P-26	P-84	P-76	P-84	P-76	P-34
2.	P-25	P-85	P-25	P-85	P-26	G-32	P-26	G-32
3.	P-76	P-34	P-76	G-32	G-78	P-34	P-25	P-84
4.	G-78	G-32	G-78	P-34	P-25	P-85	G-78	P-85
5.	P-24	Px24	P-24	Px24	P-24	Px24	P-24	Px24
6.	Rx24		Rx24		Rx24		Rx24

The first transposition recalls the Double Wing Attack opening while the third transposition is similar to the beginning of a Bishop Exchange opening. The second transposition has similarities of both Double Wing and Bishop Exchange. The last transposition is yet another possibility.

=== Variation without gold development ===
No Gold Variation
up to move 7
☖ pieces in hand: –

9	8	7	6	5	4	3	2	1
香	桂	銀	金	王	金	銀	桂	香	1
	飛						角		2
歩		歩	歩	歩	歩		歩	歩	3
						歩	歩		4
	歩								5
		歩							6
歩	歩		歩	歩	歩	歩		歩	7
	角						飛		8
香	桂	銀	金	玉	金	銀	桂	香	9

☗ pieces in hand: –

4. P-24. After both players advance their rook pawns to the middle rank 5, there is a variation in which Black immediately attacks on the second file without the usual left gold fortification (4. G-78) shown in the main lines above.

This may still develop into a standard Side Pawn Capture opening. However, there are other possible options which diverge from Side Pawn.

== Subsequent variations ==
White's 2nd File Pawn Drop
move 12
☖ pieces in hand: –

9	8	7	6	5	4	3	2	1
香	桂	銀	金	王		銀	桂	香	1
	飛					金	角		2
歩		歩	歩	歩	歩		歩	歩	3
						歩	飛		4
	歩								5
		歩							6
歩	歩		歩	歩	歩	歩		歩	7
	角	金							8
香	桂	銀		玉	金	銀	桂	香	9

☗ pieces in hand: 歩
6... P*23
White's 8th File Pawn Trade
move 12
☖ pieces in hand: 歩

9	8	7	6	5	4	3	2	1
香	桂	銀	金	王		銀	桂	香	1
	飛					金	角		2
歩		歩	歩	歩	歩			歩	3
						歩	飛		4
									5
	歩	歩							6
歩	歩		歩	歩	歩	歩		歩	7
	角	金							8
香	桂	銀		玉	金	銀	桂	香	9

☗ pieces in hand: 歩
6... P-86

At Black's pawn trade on the second file (move 11), White has two main options. The most common option is for White to initiate a pawn trade on their rook's file. This will most likely lead to the Side Pawn Capture opening. (See § White's eighth file pawn trade below.)

The second option is for White to attack Black's rook with a pawn drop on the second file. This option can still lead to a Side Pawn Capture opening and was the older preferred option. (See following § ☖P-23.) However, White's 23 pawn drop move may also lead to a Double Wing Attack opening.

=== ☖6...P*23 variation ===
☖ P*23
up to move 12
☖ pieces in hand: –

9	8	7	6	5	4	3	2	1
香	桂	銀	金	王		銀	桂	香	1
	飛					金	角		2
歩		歩	歩	歩	歩		歩	歩	3
						歩	飛		4
	歩								5
		歩							6
歩	歩		歩	歩	歩	歩		歩	7
	角	金							8
香	桂	銀		玉	金	銀	桂	香	9

☗ pieces in hand: 歩
Side pawn captured
up to move 13
☖ pieces in hand: –

9	8	7	6	5	4	3	2	1
香	桂	銀	金	王		銀	桂	香	1
	飛					金	角		2
歩		歩	歩	歩	歩		歩	歩	3
						飛			4
	歩								5
		歩							6
歩	歩		歩	歩	歩	歩		歩	7
	角	金							8
香	桂	銀		玉	金	銀	桂	香	9

☗ pieces in hand: 歩歩

6...P*23. White drops their pawn in hand on the 23 square attacking Black's rook – a striking pawn tactic.

Next, Black will capture White's side pawn (7. Rx34) for this Side Pawn Capture variation. However, it is possible that Black could pull their rook back to 26 (Floating Rook) or 28 (Retreating Rook) for a Double Wing Attack variation. In the case of a Double Wing opening, Floating Rook (7. R-26) is the more common position since the rook will defend Black's side pawn on 76, which could otherwise be captured by White if R-28.

=== White's eighth file pawn trade variations (6...P-86 7.Px86 Rx86) ===
Side Pawn Capture
up to move 12
☖ pieces in hand: 歩

9	8	7	6	5	4	3	2	1
香	桂	銀	金	王		銀	桂	香	1
	飛					金	角		2
歩		歩	歩	歩	歩			歩	3
						歩	飛		4
									5
	歩	歩							6
歩	歩		歩	歩	歩	歩		歩	7
	角	金							8
香	桂	銀		玉	金	銀	桂	香	9

☗ pieces in hand: 歩
Side Pawn Capture
up to move 14
☖ pieces in hand: 歩歩

9	8	7	6	5	4	3	2	1
香	桂	銀	金	王		銀	桂	香	1
						金	角		2
歩		歩	歩	歩	歩			歩	3
						歩	飛		4
									5
	飛	歩							6
歩			歩	歩	歩	歩		歩	7
	角	金							8
香	桂	銀		玉	金	銀	桂	香	9

☗ pieces in hand: 歩歩

6... P-86, 7. Px86 Rx86. White trades their rook pawn on the eighth file.

This is the most common move to transition to a typical Side Pawn Capture opening.

After this, both players have two pawns in the hand and their rooks are fully activated.

Side Pawn Capture
up to move 15
☖ pieces in hand: 歩歩

9	8	7	6	5	4	3	2	1
香	桂	銀	金	王		銀	桂	香	1
						金	角		2
歩		歩	歩	歩	歩			歩	3
						飛			4
									5
	飛	歩							6
歩			歩	歩	歩	歩		歩	7
	角	金							8
香	桂	銀		玉	金	銀	桂	香	9

☗ pieces in hand: 歩歩歩

8. Rx34. Black captures White's pawn on the third file ending up with three pawns in hand. This is the defining characteristic of Side Pawn Capture openings.

Following Black's side pawn capture, White has several options that will determine both White and Black's strategies. The most important constraint on these choices is that White must not allow Black to initiate a bishop trade with their gold on 32 undefended. One option is for White to prevent Black from initiating a bishop trade by moving a piece to the 33 square. This includes either the set of ☖ Bishop-33 strategies or a Knight-33 strategy. (See § Variations with White blocking Black's bishop trade below.) Another option is for White to initiate a bishop trade first, which leads to Double Side Pawn Capture and Bishop*45 strategies among others. (See § White's bishop trade variations below.) Another minor option is for White to move their king to the 41 square protecting the gold on 32 (See § ☖8...K-41 below).

Note that a Side Pawn Capture opening is not the only possibility here. Black may also pull their rook back to 26 or 28 for a Double Wing Attack opening with open bishop diagonals. If the rook is pulled back to 26, then the rook will prevent White from playing a reversed Side Pawn position (with Rx76) while pulling the rook back to 28 does give White this option.

==== Blunder: Allowing Black's bishop trade ====
After Black captures White's side pawn, White must prevent Black from initiating a bishop trade. Otherwise, Black will make the bishop trade leading to a trap that puts White in a poor structure.

==== Variations with White blocking Black's bishop trade ====
Blocking with Bishop Option
move 16
☖ pieces in hand: 歩歩

9	8	7	6	5	4	3	2	1
香	桂	銀	金	王		銀	桂	香	1
						金			2
歩		歩	歩	歩	歩	角		歩	3
						飛			4
									5
	飛	歩							6
歩			歩	歩	歩	歩		歩	7
	角	金							8
香	桂	銀		玉	金	銀	桂	香	9

☗ pieces in hand: 歩歩歩
Blocking with Knight Option
move 16
☖ pieces in hand: 歩歩

9	8	7	6	5	4	3	2	1
香	桂	銀	金	王		銀		香	1
						金	角		2
歩		歩	歩	歩	歩	桂		歩	3
						飛			4
									5
	飛	歩							6
歩			歩	歩	歩	歩		歩	7
	角	金							8
香	桂	銀		玉	金	銀	桂	香	9

☗ pieces in hand: 歩歩歩

One of the major options of Side Pawn Capture is to block Black from initiating a bishop trade. Either a bishop or a knight can be used for this purpose. However, blocking with a bishop is most popular variation. These strategies are known simply as Bishop-33 and Knight-33 variations.

===== ☖8...B-33 =====
☖...B-33
up to move 16
☖ pieces in hand: 歩歩

9	8	7	6	5	4	3	2	1
香	桂	銀	金	王		銀	桂	香	1
						金			2
歩		歩	歩	歩	歩	角		歩	3
						飛			4
									5
	飛	歩							6
歩			歩	歩	歩	歩		歩	7
	角	金							8
香	桂	銀		玉	金	銀	桂	香	9

☗ pieces in hand: 歩歩歩

Using the bishop to block Black from trading bishops is the most common main variation of Side Pawn Capture.

===== ☖8...N-33 =====
☖...N-33
up to move 16
☖ pieces in hand: 歩歩

9	8	7	6	5	4	3	2	1
香	桂	銀	金	王		銀		香	1
						金	角		2
歩		歩	歩	歩	歩	桂		歩	3
						飛			4
									5
	飛	歩							6
歩			歩	歩	歩	歩		歩	7
	角	金							8
香	桂	銀		玉	金	銀	桂	香	9

☗ pieces in hand: 歩歩歩

8...N-33.

==== White's bishop trade variations (☖8...Bx88) ====
Side Pawn Capture
up to move 16
☖ pieces in hand: 角 歩歩

9	8	7	6	5	4	3	2	1
香	桂	銀	金	王		銀	桂	香	1
						金			2
歩		歩	歩	歩	歩			歩	3
						飛			4
									5
	飛	歩							6
歩			歩	歩	歩	歩		歩	7
	馬	金							8
香	桂	銀		玉	金	銀	桂	香	9

☗ pieces in hand: 歩歩歩
Side Pawn Capture
up to move 17
☖ pieces in hand: 角 歩歩

9	8	7	6	5	4	3	2	1
香	桂	銀	金	王		銀	桂	香	1
						金			2
歩		歩	歩	歩	歩			歩	3
						飛			4
									5
	飛	歩							6
歩			歩	歩	歩	歩		歩	7
	銀	金							8
香	桂			玉	金	銀	桂	香	9

☗ pieces in hand: 角 歩歩歩

8...Bx88+ 9.Sx88. Rather than preventing Black's bishop trade, White can instead initiate the bishop trade. This move allows White's silver to remain on 31 so that it still defends their gold on 32. (If Black were to make the bishop trade with Bx22+, then White's silver would be forced to recapture with Sx22 leaving the gold on 32 undefending allowing Black to capture the gold for free with Rx32+.)

Following the trade, White can initiate several different options including taking Black's side pawn (Double Side Pawn Capture), dropping their pawn on 28 and bishop on 45 (☖B*45), dropping their pawn on 38 and bishop on 44 (☖B*44), and dropping their bishop to 33 (☖Rapid Attack B*33).

Side Pawn option
move 18
☖ pieces in hand: 角 歩歩歩

9	8	7	6	5	4	3	2	1
香	桂	銀	金	王		銀	桂	香	1
						金			2
歩		歩	歩	歩	歩			歩	3
						飛			4
									5
		飛							6
歩			歩	歩	歩	歩		歩	7
	銀	金							8
香	桂			玉	金	銀	桂	香	9

☗ pieces in hand: 角 歩歩歩
Double Side Pawn Capture
2nd File Pawn Drop Option
move 18
☖ pieces in hand: 角 歩

9	8	7	6	5	4	3	2	1
香	桂	銀	金	王		銀	桂	香	1
						金			2
歩		歩	歩	歩	歩			歩	3
						飛			4
									5
	飛	歩							6
歩			歩	歩	歩	歩		歩	7
	銀	金					歩		8
香	桂			玉	金	銀	桂	香	9

☗ pieces in hand: 角 歩歩歩
☖B*45
3rd File Pawn Drop Option
move 18
☖ pieces in hand: 角 歩

9	8	7	6	5	4	3	2	1
香	桂	銀	金	王		銀	桂	香	1
						金			2
歩		歩	歩	歩	歩			歩	3
						飛			4
									5
	飛	歩							6
歩			歩	歩	歩	歩		歩	7
	銀	金				歩			8
香	桂			玉	金	銀	桂	香	9

☗ pieces in hand: 角 歩歩歩
☖B*44
3rd File Bishop Drop Option
move 18
☖ pieces in hand: 歩歩

9	8	7	6	5	4	3	2	1
香	桂	銀	金	王		銀	桂	香	1
						金			2
歩		歩	歩	歩	歩	角		歩	3
						飛			4
									5
	飛	歩							6
歩			歩	歩	歩	歩		歩	7
	銀	金							8
香	桂			玉	金	銀	桂	香	9

☗ pieces in hand: 角 歩歩歩
☖Rapid Attack B*33

===== Double Side Pawn (☖9...Rx76) =====
Double Side Pawn
up to move 18
☖ pieces in hand: 角 歩歩歩

9	8	7	6	5	4	3	2	1
香	桂	銀	金	王		銀	桂	香	1
						金			2
歩		歩	歩	歩	歩			歩	3
						飛			4
									5
		飛							6
歩			歩	歩	歩	歩		歩	7
	銀	金							8
香	桂			玉	金	銀	桂	香	9

☗ pieces in hand: 角 歩歩歩

This is White's most aggressive move leading to very dynamic play.

Double Side Pawn, Main Line
up to move 23
☖ pieces in hand: 飛 角 歩歩歩

9	8	7	6	5	4	3	2	1
香	桂	銀	金	王		銀	桂	香	1
						金			2
歩			歩	歩	歩			歩	3
		歩							4
									5
					角				6
歩		銀	歩	歩	歩	歩		歩	7
		金							8
香	桂			玉	金	銀	桂	香	9

☗ pieces in hand: 飛 歩歩歩

===== ☖10...B*45 =====
☖B*45
up to move 20
☖ pieces in hand: 歩

9	8	7	6	5	4	3	2	1
香	桂	銀	金	王		銀	桂	香	1
						金			2
歩		歩	歩	歩	歩			歩	3
						飛			4
					角				5
	飛	歩							6
歩			歩	歩	歩	歩		歩	7
	銀	金					銀		8
香	桂			玉	金		桂	香	9

☗ pieces in hand: 角 歩歩歩歩

The ☖Bishop*45 Side Pawn variation is one of the Side Pawn variations that starts with bishop trade initiated by White (that is, 8...Bx88+ 9.Sx88). It is named after the bishop drop position – the 45 square – that White makes three moves after the bishop trade. Before the bishop drop, a pawn drop is made on the second file in order to lure Black's silver to 22 (...P*22 Sx22).

===== ☖10...B*44 =====
☖B*44
up to move 18
☖ pieces in hand: 角 歩

9	8	7	6	5	4	3	2	1
香	桂	銀	金	王		銀	桂	香	1
						金			2
歩		歩	歩	歩	歩			歩	3
						飛			4
									5
	飛	歩							6
歩			歩	歩	歩	歩		歩	7
	銀	金				歩			8
香	桂			玉	金	銀	桂	香	9

☗ pieces in hand: 角 歩歩歩
☖B*44
up to move 19
☖ pieces in hand: 角 歩

9	8	7	6	5	4	3	2	1
香	桂	銀	金	王		銀	桂	香	1
						金			2
歩		歩	歩	歩	歩			歩	3
						飛			4
									5
	飛	歩							6
歩			歩	歩	歩	歩		歩	7
	銀	金				銀			8
香	桂			玉	金		桂	香	9

☗ pieces in hand: 角 歩歩歩歩

9...P*38.

10. Sx38.

☖B*44
up to move 20
☖ pieces in hand: 歩

9	8	7	6	5	4	3	2	1
香	桂	銀	金	王		銀	桂	香	1
						金			2
歩		歩	歩	歩	歩			歩	3
					角	飛			4
									5
	飛	歩							6
歩			歩	歩	歩	歩		歩	7
	銀	金				銀			8
香	桂			玉	金		桂	香	9

☗ pieces in hand: 角 歩歩歩歩

10...B*44.

===== ☖9...B*33 Rapid Attack =====
☖B*33
up to move 18
☖ pieces in hand: 歩歩

9	8	7	6	5	4	3	2	1
香	桂	銀	金	王		銀	桂	香	1
						金			2
歩		歩	歩	歩	歩	角		歩	3
						飛			4
									5
	飛	歩							6
歩			歩	歩	歩	歩		歩	7
	銀	金							8
香	桂			玉	金	銀	桂	香	9

☗ pieces in hand: 角 歩歩歩

The Rapid Attack Bishop*33 variation of Side Pawn Capture (横歩取り急戦☖3三角) has White dropping their bishop to 33 right after making the bishop trade.

This is not to be confused with the more common mainline Bishop-33 variation that does not trade the bishops first. (See: Side Pawn Capture Bishop-33.)

==== ☖8...K-41 variation ====
☖...K-41
☖ pieces in hand: 歩歩

9	8	7	6	5	4	3	2	1
香	桂	銀	金		王	銀	桂	香	1
						金	角		2
歩		歩	歩	歩	歩			歩	3
						飛			4
									5
	飛	歩							6
歩			歩	歩	歩	歩		歩	7
	角	金							8
香	桂	銀		玉	金	銀	桂	香	9

☗ pieces in hand: 歩歩歩

Although the more common Side Pawn strategies prevent White's undefended gold on 32 by either stopping Black from making a bishop trade or by White making the bishop trade first, the K-41 variation moves their king to the fourth file directly protecting the gold on 32. With this positioning, White does not have to prevent Black from making the bishop trade in the first place.

The K-41 variation is an old variation played in the 1800s. However, now it is very uncommon although it was used a few times by professional players as late as 2016 and 2017. The strategy is covered in Iijima's (2014) book on Rapid Attack (超急) variations of the Side Pawn.

==== ☖8...R-82 variation ====
☖...R-82
☖ pieces in hand: 歩歩

9	8	7	6	5	4	3	2	1
香	桂	銀	金	王		銀	桂	香	1
	飛					金	角		2
歩		歩	歩	歩	歩			歩	3
						飛			4
									5
		歩							6
歩			歩	歩	歩	歩		歩	7
	角	金							8
香	桂	銀		玉	金	銀	桂	香	9

☗ pieces in hand: 歩歩歩

Another answer to Black's bishop threat is for White to retreat their rook back to their camp on rank 2 (...R-82). With the rook returned to its starting square, it can protect the silver and/or gold on rank 2 rendering Black's bishop attack pointless.

==== ☖8...K-42 variation ====
☖...K-42
☖ pieces in hand: 歩歩

9	8	7	6	5	4	3	2	1
香	桂	銀	金			銀	桂	香	1
					王	金	角		2
歩		歩	歩	歩	歩			歩	3
						飛			4
									5
	飛	歩							6
歩			歩	歩	歩	歩		歩	7
	角	金							8
香	桂	銀		玉	金	銀	桂	香	9

☗ pieces in hand: 歩歩歩

== Reverse Side Pawn Capture ==
Reverse Side Pawn
Left Edge Pawn
☖ pieces in hand: 歩歩歩

9	8	7	6	5	4	3	2	1
香	桂	銀	金	王		銀	桂	香	1
						金	角		2
歩		歩	歩	歩	歩			歩	3
						歩	飛		4
									5
歩		飛							6
			歩	歩	歩	歩		歩	7
	角	金							8
香	桂	銀		玉	金	銀	桂	香	9

☗ pieces in hand: 歩歩
Reverse Side Pawn
Right Edge Pawn
☖ pieces in hand: 歩歩歩

9	8	7	6	5	4	3	2	1
香	桂	銀	金	王		銀	桂	香	1
						金	角		2
歩		歩	歩	歩	歩			歩	3
						歩	飛		4
									5
		飛						歩	6
歩			歩	歩	歩	歩			7
	角	金							8
香	桂	銀		玉	金	銀	桂	香	9

☗ pieces in hand: 歩歩

Although Black usually takes the side pawn, it is also possible that Black may reject White's side pawn gambit allowing the White the possibility to take Black's side pawn resulting in a Reverse Side Pawn Capture (逆横歩取り gyaku yokofudori or 後手横歩取り gote yokofudori) opening. This is typically done by Black pushing an edge pawn instead of capturing White's side pawn. After the edge pawn push, White may decide to take Black's side pawn leading to a Side Pawn Capture position with Black and White's sides reversed (with the extra edge pawn push by Black).

This may be done if Black prefers the lines usually played by White or if Black plans to exploit the ramifications of playing White with an extra edge pawn push or merely for psychological effect.

In professional games, these positions are uncommon and often lead to Double Wing Attack variations instead.

Reverse Side Pawn
☖ pieces in hand: 歩歩歩

9	8	7	6	5	4	3	2	1
香	桂	銀	金	王		銀	桂	香	1
						金	角		2
歩		歩	歩	歩	歩			歩	3
						歩	飛		4
									5
		飛							6
歩			歩	歩	歩	歩		歩	7
	角	金	玉						8
香	桂	銀			金	銀	桂	香	9

☗ pieces in hand: 歩歩
Reverse Side Pawn
☖ pieces in hand: 歩歩歩

9	8	7	6	5	4	3	2	1
香	桂	銀	金	王		銀	桂	香	1
						金	角		2
歩		歩	歩	歩	歩			歩	3
						歩	飛		4
									5
		飛							6
歩			歩	歩	歩	歩		歩	7
	角	金		玉					8
香	桂	銀			金	銀	桂	香	9

☗ pieces in hand: 歩歩
Reverse Side Pawn
☖ pieces in hand: 歩歩歩

9	8	7	6	5	4	3	2	1
香	桂	銀	金	王		銀	桂	香	1
						金	角		2
歩		歩	歩	歩	歩			歩	3
						歩	飛		4
									5
		飛							6
歩			歩	歩	歩	歩		歩	7
	角	金							8
香	桂	銀	玉		金	銀	桂	香	9

☗ pieces in hand: 歩歩

Reserve Side Pawn positions are also possible if Black moves their king instead.

=== Game example ===
Sugai vs Gōda 2018
☖ pieces in hand: 歩歩歩

9	8	7	6	5	4	3	2	1
香	桂	銀	金			銀	桂	香	1
				王		金	角		2
歩		歩	歩	歩	歩			歩	3
						歩	飛		4
									5
		飛				歩			6
歩			歩	歩	歩			歩	7
	角	金		玉					8
香	桂	銀			金	銀	桂	香	9

☗ pieces in hand: 歩歩
Gōda captures the side pawn on move 18

Tatsuya Sugai vs Masataka Gōda Meijin ranking tournament on January 17, 2018.

== See also ==
- Double Side Pawn Capture
- Static Rook

== Bibliography ==
- Aono, Teruichi (1983). Guide to shogi openings: Unlock the secrets of joseki 将棋定跡のカギ: 和英 定跡問題集. Translated by Fairbairn, John. 山海堂. ISBN 4-381-00598-8.
- Fairbairn, John (1986). Shogi for beginners (2nd ed.). Ishi Press. ISBN 978-4-8718-720-10.
- Hosking, Tony (1997). The art of shogi. The Shogi Foundation. ISBN 978-0-95310-890-9.
- 飯島, 栄治 [in Japanese] (2014). 横歩取り超急戦のすべて. マイナビ出版.
- 飯島, 栄治 [in Japanese] (2016). 横歩取りハメ手裏定跡. マイナビ出版.
- Kitao, Madoka (2011). Joseki at a glance. Translated by Kawasaki, Tomohide. Nekomado. ISBN 978-4-9052-2501-0.
- Kunio, Naito (1979). "Hypermodern shogi: Aerial combat". Shogi (19). Translated by Fairbairn, John: 4–6.
- Segawa, Shoji [in Japanese] (2013). 横歩取りマップ. マイナビ出版. ISBN 978-4-8399-5000-2.
