= Side Pawn Capture, Bishop-33 =

Side Pawn Capture
Bishop-33 Variation
☖ pieces in hand: 歩歩

9	8	7	6	5	4	3	2	1
香	桂	銀	金	王		銀	桂	香	1
						金			2
歩		歩	歩	歩	歩	角		歩	3
						飛			4
									5
	飛	歩							6
歩			歩	歩	歩	歩		歩	7
	角	金							8
香	桂	銀		玉	金	銀	桂	香	9

☗ pieces in hand: 歩歩歩

In shogi, Side Pawn Capture Bishop-33 (横歩取り3三角 or 横歩取り☖3三角 yokofudori san-san kaku) is a set of variations stemming from the Side Pawn Capture opening, in which White first trades pawns on the eighth file and then blocks Black from trading bishops by moving White's bishop to the 33 square.

This is the most common variation of the Side Pawn opening.

== Development ==
Side Pawn Capture
up to move 15
☖ pieces in hand: 歩歩

9	8	7	6	5	4	3	2	1
香	桂	銀	金	王		銀	桂	香	1
						金	角		2
歩		歩	歩	歩	歩			歩	3
						飛			4
									5
	飛	歩							6
歩			歩	歩	歩	歩		歩	7
	角	金							8
香	桂	銀		玉	金	銀	桂	香	9

☗ pieces in hand: 歩歩歩

The moves preceding this variation follow the standard modern Side Pawn opening with White's eighth file pawn trade – namely, for instance, 1. P-77 P-34, 2. P-24 P-84, 3. P-25 P-85, 4. G-78 G-32, 5. P-24 Px24, 6. Rx24 P-86, 7. Px86 Rx86, 8. Rx34. The moves here are the first 15 moves up until Black's capture of White's side pawn by the rook which results in the rook being positioned on the 34 square as shown in the adjacent diagram. (See Side Pawn Capture for explication.)

B-33
up to move 16
☖ pieces in hand: 歩歩

9	8	7	6	5	4	3	2	1
香	桂	銀	金	王		銀	桂	香	1
						金			2
歩		歩	歩	歩	歩	角		歩	3
						飛			4
									5
	飛	歩							6
歩			歩	歩	歩	歩		歩	7
	角	金							8
香	桂	銀		玉	金	銀	桂	香	9

☗ pieces in hand: 歩歩歩

8... B-33. White moves their bishop up to the third file preventing Black from trading the bishops.

White must stop Black's bishop trade to avoid a trap. (This may be done also by blocking with a knight (N-33) or by White initiating the bishop trade from their side.)

From here, starts the Aerial Fight (空中戦 kuuchuusen) opening strategies, which are also known as the Naito opening, which is named after professional player Kunio Naitō. The aerial term refers to the way both players' rooks are positioned above their camps on the middle ranks 4, 5 and 6.

== Castles ==
Common castles include Central House and Nakahara.

== Retreating Black's rook ==
Rook Retreat
up to move 17
☖ pieces in hand: 歩歩

9	8	7	6	5	4	3	2	1
香	桂	銀	金	王		銀	桂	香	1
						金			2
歩		歩	歩	歩	歩	角		歩	3
									4
									5
	飛	歩				飛			6
歩			歩	歩	歩	歩		歩	7
	角	金							8
香	桂	銀		玉	金	銀	桂	香	9

☗ pieces in hand: 歩歩歩
9. R-36

9. R-36. The most common move has been for Black to retreat their rook back to rank 6 protecting their side pawn on 76 from being captured by White's rook.

After this move, there are numerous variations.

=== ☖R-84 ===
☖R-84
up to move 18
☖ pieces in hand: 歩歩

9	8	7	6	5	4	3	2	1
香	桂	銀	金	王		銀	桂	香	1
						金			2
歩		歩	歩	歩	歩	角		歩	3
	飛								4
									5
		歩				飛			6
歩			歩	歩	歩	歩		歩	7
	角	金							8
香	桂	銀		玉	金	銀	桂	香	9

☗ pieces in hand: 歩歩歩
9... R-84

9...R-84. The ☖R-84 opening frequently starts by moving the rook back immediately.

However, it is also possible to postpone this move and instead first move the left silver to the 22 square, which is a needed move anyway. Postponing the rook retreat allows White to wait and see whether Black will next drop a pawn to the 87 square. If Black does do this pawn drop, then White will have the option of playing ☖R-84 but also the ☖R-85 option as well. As a result of this flexibility, 9...S-22 has become the more common move in professional games compared with 9...R-84 and is, thus, less revealing of White's strategy. Nonetheless, 9...R-84, 10. R-26 S-22, 11. P*87 is the older move order and can be transposed as 9...S-22, 10. P*87 R-84, 11. R-26. (The 9...S-22, 10. P*87 sequence is shown below with the middle rank rook position in §☖R-85 variation.)

☖R-84
up to move 19
☖ pieces in hand: 歩歩

9	8	7	6	5	4	3	2	1
香	桂	銀	金	王		銀	桂	香	1
						金			2
歩		歩	歩	歩	歩	角		歩	3
	飛								4
									5
		歩					飛		6
歩			歩	歩	歩	歩		歩	7
	角	金							8
香	桂	銀		玉	金	銀	桂	香	9

☗ pieces in hand: 歩歩歩
10. R-26
☖R-84
up to move 20
☖ pieces in hand: 歩歩

9	8	7	6	5	4	3	2	1
香	桂	銀	金	王			桂	香	1
						金	銀		2
歩		歩	歩	歩	歩	角		歩	3
	飛								4
									5
		歩					飛		6
歩			歩	歩	歩	歩		歩	7
	角	金							8
香	桂	銀		玉	金	銀	桂	香	9

☗ pieces in hand: 歩歩歩
10... S-22

☖R-84
up to move 21
☖ pieces in hand: 歩歩

9	8	7	6	5	4	3	2	1
香	桂	銀	金	王			桂	香	1
						金	銀		2
歩		歩	歩	歩	歩	角		歩	3
	飛								4
									5
		歩					飛		6
歩	歩		歩	歩	歩	歩		歩	7
	角	金							8
香	桂	銀		玉	金	銀	桂	香	9

☗ pieces in hand: 歩歩
11. P*87

==== ☖R-84 ☖K-52 ====
☖K-52
up to move 22
☖ pieces in hand: 歩歩

9	8	7	6	5	4	3	2	1
香	桂	銀	金				桂	香	1
				王		金	銀		2
歩		歩	歩	歩	歩	角		歩	3
	飛								4
									5
		歩					飛		6
歩	歩		歩	歩	歩	歩		歩	7
	角	金							8
香	桂	銀		玉	金	銀	桂	香	9

☗ pieces in hand: 歩歩
11... K-52

===== ☖R-84 ☖K-52 ☗K-58 =====
☗K-58
up to move 23
☖ pieces in hand: 歩歩

9	8	7	6	5	4	3	2	1
香	桂	銀	金				桂	香	1
				王		金	銀		2
歩		歩	歩	歩	歩	角		歩	3
	飛								4
									5
		歩					飛		6
歩	歩		歩	歩	歩	歩		歩	7
	角	金		玉					8
香	桂	銀			金	銀	桂	香	9

☗ pieces in hand: 歩歩
12. K-58
Double Central House
☖ pieces in hand: 歩歩

9	8	7	6	5	4	3	2	1
香	桂						桂	香	1
		金	銀	王		金	銀		2
歩		歩	歩	歩	歩	角		歩	3
	飛								4
									5
		歩					飛		6
歩	歩		歩	歩	歩	歩		歩	7
	角	金		玉	銀	金			8
香	桂	銀					桂	香	9

☗ pieces in hand: 歩歩

===== ☖R-84 ☖K-52 ☗K-68 =====
☗K-68
up to move 23
☖ pieces in hand: 歩歩

9	8	7	6	5	4	3	2	1
香	桂	銀	金				桂	香	1
				王		金	銀		2
歩		歩	歩	歩	歩	角		歩	3
	飛								4
									5
		歩					飛		6
歩	歩		歩	歩	歩	歩		歩	7
	角	金	玉						8
香	桂	銀			金	銀	桂	香	9

☗ pieces in hand: 歩歩
12. K-68

==== ☖R-84 ☖K-41 Nakahara castle ====
☖K-41
up to move 22
☖ pieces in hand: 歩歩

9	8	7	6	5	4	3	2	1
香	桂	銀	金		王		桂	香	1
						金	銀		2
歩		歩	歩	歩	歩	角		歩	3
	飛								4
									5
		歩					飛		6
歩	歩		歩	歩	歩	歩		歩	7
	角	金							8
香	桂	銀		玉	金	銀	桂	香	9

☗ pieces in hand: 歩歩
11... K-41
Central House vs Nakahara
☖ pieces in hand: 歩歩

9	8	7	6	5	4	3	2	1
香	桂			金	王		桂	香	1
			銀			金	銀		2
歩		歩	歩	歩	歩	角		歩	3
	飛								4
									5
		歩					飛		6
歩	歩		歩	歩	歩	歩		歩	7
	角	金		玉	銀	金			8
香	桂	銀					桂	香	9

☗ pieces in hand: 歩歩

=== Chūza's Rook (☖R-85) variation ===
☖R-85
up to move 20
☖ pieces in hand: 歩歩

9	8	7	6	5	4	3	2	1
香	桂	銀	金	王			桂	香	1
						金	銀		2
歩		歩	歩	歩	歩	角		歩	3
									4
	飛								5
		歩				飛			6
歩	歩		歩	歩	歩	歩		歩	7
	角	金							8
香	桂	銀		玉	金	銀	桂	香	9

☗ pieces in hand: 歩歩歩
10... R-85

The Chūza's Rook variation starts with R-85 (instead of the older R-84 move). It is named after Makoto Chūza.

==== ☖ K-41 variation ====
☖R-85 ☖K-41
up to move 22
☖ pieces in hand: 歩歩

9	8	7	6	5	4	3	2	1
香	桂	銀	金		王		桂	香	1
						金	銀		2
歩		歩	歩	歩	歩	角		歩	3
									4
	飛								5
		歩					飛		6
歩	歩		歩	歩	歩	歩		歩	7
	角	金							8
香	桂	銀		玉	金	銀	桂	香	9

☗ pieces in hand: 歩歩歩
11... K-41

This move gives an indication that White will form a Nakahara castle.

☖R-85 ☖K-41
up to move 23
☖ pieces in hand: 歩歩

9	8	7	6	5	4	3	2	1
香	桂	銀	金		王		桂	香	1
						金	銀		2
歩		歩	歩	歩	歩	角		歩	3
									4
	飛								5
		歩					飛		6
歩	歩		歩	歩	歩	歩		歩	7
	角	金	玉						8
香	桂	銀			金	銀	桂	香	9

☗ pieces in hand: 歩歩歩
☖R-85 ☖K-41
up to move 23
☖ pieces in hand: 歩歩

9	8	7	6	5	4	3	2	1
香	桂	銀	金		王		桂	香	1
						金	銀		2
歩		歩	歩	歩	歩	角		歩	3
									4
	飛								5
		歩					飛		6
歩	歩		歩	歩	歩	歩		歩	7
	角	金		玉					8
香	桂	銀			金	銀	桂	香	9

☗ pieces in hand: 歩歩歩

Black has a choice of moving their king straight up to defend the line of pawns broadly as well as moving their king off of the 95–59 diagonal which is susceptible to bishop drop attacks on 95, or moving their king up and leftwards to protect their left gold in case White initiates a bishop trade.

== Aono variation ==
Aono
up to move 17
☖ pieces in hand: 歩歩

9	8	7	6	5	4	3	2	1
香	桂	銀	金	王		銀	桂	香	1
						金			2
歩		歩	歩	歩	歩	角		歩	3
						飛			4
									5
	飛	歩							6
歩			歩	歩	歩	歩		歩	7
	角	金		玉					8
香	桂	銀			金	銀	桂	香	9

☗ pieces in hand: 歩歩歩
9. K-58

Aono Side Pawn (青野流 aono-ryū) is one of the Side Pawn Capture variants. It is named after professional Teruichi Aono. (This not to be confused with Aono's Fortress and Bishop Exchange variations.)

9. K-58. Instead of retreating their rook to rank 6 (see § Retreating Black's rook above), Black keeps their rook positioned on the 34 square and moves their king straight up to rank 8 protecting the line of pawns above it.

By not moving their rook to the 36 square as in the most common variations, Black's third file pawn can be advanced allowing for their right knight to develop early to the 37 square.

Aono
up to move 18
☖ pieces in hand: 歩歩

9	8	7	6	5	4	3	2	1
香	桂	銀	金	王			桂	香	1
						金	銀		2
歩		歩	歩	歩	歩	角		歩	3
						飛			4
									5
	飛	歩							6
歩			歩	歩	歩	歩		歩	7
	角	金		玉					8
香	桂	銀			金	銀	桂	香	9

☗ pieces in hand: 歩歩歩
9. ...S-22
Aono
up to move 19
☖ pieces in hand: 歩歩

9	8	7	6	5	4	3	2	1
香	桂	銀	金	王			桂	香	1
						金	銀		2
歩		歩	歩	歩	歩	角		歩	3
						飛			4
									5
	飛	歩				歩			6
歩			歩	歩	歩			歩	7
	角	金		玉					8
香	桂	銀			金	銀	桂	香	9

☗ pieces in hand: 歩歩歩
10. P-36

Aono △K-42
up to move 20
☖ pieces in hand: 歩歩

9	8	7	6	5	4	3	2	1
香	桂	銀	金				桂	香	1
					王	金	銀		2
歩		歩	歩	歩	歩	角		歩	3
						飛			4
									5
	飛	歩				歩			6
歩			歩	歩	歩			歩	7
	角	金		玉					8
香	桂	銀			金	銀	桂	香	9

☗ pieces in hand: 歩歩歩
10. ...K-42
Aono △K-42
up to move 21
☖ pieces in hand: 歩歩

9	8	7	6	5	4	3	2	1
香	桂	銀	金				桂	香	1
					王	金	銀		2
歩		歩	歩	歩	歩	角		歩	3
						飛			4
									5
	飛	歩				歩			6
歩			歩	歩	歩	桂		歩	7
	角	金		玉					8
香	桂	銀			金	銀		香	9

☗ pieces in hand: 歩歩歩
11. N-37

One common positioning of White's king is on the 42 square.

== Yūki variation ==
Yūki
up to move 17
☖ pieces in hand: 歩歩

9	8	7	6	5	4	3	2	1
香	桂	銀	金	王		銀	桂	香	1
						金			2
歩		歩	歩	歩	歩	角		歩	3
						飛			4
									5
	飛	歩							6
歩			歩	歩	歩	歩		歩	7
	角	金	玉						8
香	桂	銀			金	銀	桂	香	9

☗ pieces in hand: 歩歩歩
9. K-68

Yūki Side Pawn (勇気流 yūki-ryū) is another Side Pawn Capture variant, developed by professional player Yūki Sasaki. The variation was created by Sasaki as he did his research on his playstyle on the shogi board he inherited from Nobuyuki Ōuchi who died in 2017. Sasaki was awarded the Kōzō Masuda Award for this development in 2018, along with Aono.

9. K-68. This variation is characterized by the 9. K-68 move (instead of 9. K-58 in the Aono variation), which puts the king next to the left gold. Just like in Aono variation, the aim is to attack by moving P-36, and N-37. Unlike the Aono variation, when White captures the side pawn with Rx76, Black can move the knight to N-37 regardless of it. In the Aono variation, following Rx76 White will aim at a bishop exchange with Bx88, which will be followed by Sx88 leaving the left gold unprotected and easily captured by the rook, hence Black needs to play something else before N-37. This is not a problem in the Yūki variation as the king at 68 defends the gold, so White can play N-37 without any problem.

== Takebe ☗Rx33+ variation ==
☗Rx33+
up to move 17
☖ pieces in hand: 歩歩

9	8	7	6	5	4	3	2	1
香	桂	銀	金	王		銀	桂	香	1
						金			2
歩		歩	歩	歩	歩	龍		歩	3
									4
									5
	飛	歩							6
歩			歩	歩	歩	歩		歩	7
	角	金							8
香	桂	銀		玉	金	銀	桂	香	9

☗ pieces in hand: 角 歩歩歩
☗Rx33+
up to move 22
☖ pieces in hand: 角 歩歩

9	8	7	6	5	4	3	2	1
香	桂	銀	金	王		銀		香	1
						金			2
歩		歩	歩	歩	歩	桂		歩	3
									4
									5
		歩							6
歩			歩	歩	歩	歩	飛	歩	7
	角	金							8
香	桂	銀		玉	金	銀	桂	香	9

☗ pieces in hand: 飛 歩歩歩

Professional shogi player, Sayuri Takebe, has played an aggressive variation where instead of pulling back the rook as usual, the rook is traded for a bishop (9. Rx33+). This allows the bishop in hand to be dropped to the 77 square attacking White's rook on 86. White's response is to trade their rook for Black's bishop on 88. This gives White both a rook and bishop in hand while Black has rook in hand (Black's bishop remains on the board). White, then, is able to drop their rook on the second file.

== See also ==
- Side Pawn Capture
- Double Side Pawn Capture
- Static Rook

== Bibliography ==
- Hosking, Tony (1996). The art of shogi. The Shogi Foundation. ISBN 978-0-95310-890-9.
- Kitao, Madoka (2011). Joseki at a glance. Translated by Kawasaki, Tomohide. Nekomado. ISBN 978-4-9052-2501-0.
