= Double Side Pawn Capture =

Side Pawn Capture
☖ pieces in hand: 角 歩歩歩

9	8	7	6	5	4	3	2	1
香	桂	銀	金	王		銀	桂	香	1
						金			2
歩		歩	歩	歩	歩			歩	3
						飛			4
									5
		飛							6
歩			歩	歩	歩	歩		歩	7
	銀	金							8
香	桂			玉	金	銀	桂	香	9

☗ pieces in hand: 角 歩歩歩

In shogi, Double Side Pawn Capture (相横歩取り ai-yokofudori) is a Side Pawn Capture (Double Static Rook) opening in which both players capture each other's side pawn (as opposed to only Black taking White's side pawn) and White has exchanged bishops.

== Development ==
From the typical sequence of regular side pawn capture (1. P-7f, P-3d; 2. P-2f, P-8d; 3. P-2e, P-8e; 4. G-7h, G-3b; 5. P-2d, Px2d; 6. Rx2d, P-8f; 7. Px8f, Rx8f; 8. Rx3d), the basic sequence for double side pawn capture continues with 8. ...Bx8h+; 9. Sx8h, Rx7f, so that White can capture the side pawn in turn (see attached Diagram).

At this point, Black must defend against the white rook capturing the gold in 7h. There are different options: 10. P*7g, 10. N-7g or 10. S-7g, the latter being the favorite among professional players. After 10. S-7g, one option is 10. ...R-7d, after which Black has two options: Exchanging rooks with 11. Rx7d, or rejecting the exchange by retreating to 11. R-3f. In the latter case, the game becomes a slow game.

== See also ==
- Side Pawn Capture
- Side Pawn Capture Bishop-33
- Static Rook

== Bibliography ==
- Hosking, Tony (1996). The art of shogi. The Shogi Foundation. ISBN 978-0-95310-890-9.
- Kitao, Madoka (2011). Joseki at a glance. Translated by Kawasaki, Tomohide. Nekomado. ISBN 978-4-9052-2501-0.
