= Kunio Naitō =

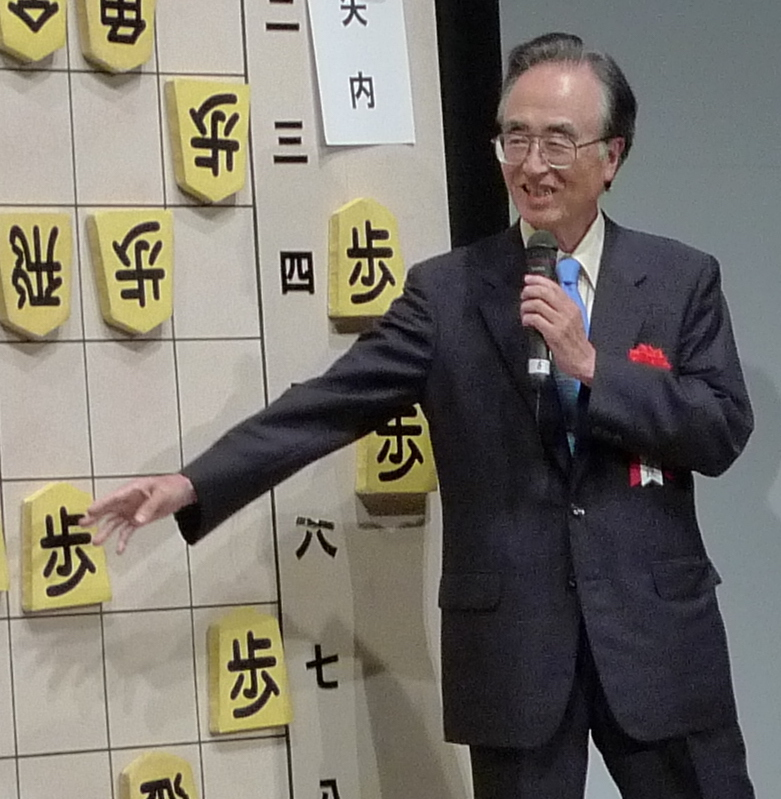
- Native name: 内藤國雄
- Born: November 15, 1939 (age 85)
- Hometown: Kobe
- Nationality: Japanese

Career
- Achieved professional status: October 1, 1958 (aged 18)
- Badge Number: 77
- Rank: 9-dan
- Retired: March 31, 2015 (56 years)
- Teacher: Kingo Fujiuchi (8-dan)
- Major titles won: 4
- Tournaments won: 13
- Career record: 1132–1000 (.531)
- Notable students: Hiromitsu Kanki; Tatsuya Sanmaidō

Websites
- JSA profile page

Kunio Naitō (内藤 國雄, Naitō Kunio; born November 15, 1939) is a Japanese retired professional shogi player who achieved the rank of 9-dan.

== Shogi professional ==
=== Promotion history ===
The promotion history for Naitō is as follows:

- 6-kyū: 1954
- 1-dan: 1956
- 4-dan: October 1, 1958
- 5-Dan: April 1, 1961
- 6-dan: April 1, 1962
- 7-dan: April 1, 1963
- 8-dan: April 1, 1967
- 9-dan: February 4, 1974
- Retired: March 31, 2015

=== Titles and other championships ===
Naitō appeared in major title matches a total of thirteen times and has won four major titles. He has won the Kisei and Ōi titles twice each. In addition to major titles, Naitō won thirteen other shogi championships during his career.

=== Awards and honors ===
Naitō has received a number of awards and honors throughout his career for his accomplishments both on an off the shogi board. These include awards given out annually by the Japan Shogi Association (JSA) for performance in official games as well as other JSA awards for career accomplishments, and awards received from governmental organizations, etc. for contributions made to Japanese society.

==== Annual Shogi Awards ====
- 1st Annual Awards (April 1973 – March 1974): Technique Award
- 10th Annual Awards (April 1982 – March 1983): Technique Award
- 22nd Annual Awards (April 1994 – March 1995): Masuda Award (for the Side Pawn Capture, Bishop-33 variation)

==== Other awards ====
- 1979: Shogi Honor Award (Awarded by the JSA in recognition of winning 600 official games as a professional)
- 1983: 25 Years Service Award (Awarded by the JSA in recognition of being an active professional for twenty-five years)
- 1983, September: Kobe Culture Special Award
- 1987: Shogi Honor Fighting-spirit Award (Awarded by JSA in recognition of winning 800 official games as a professional)
- 1991, November: Nishinomiya Citizen's Culture Award
- 1998: 40 Years Service Award (Awarded by the JSA in recognition of being an active professional for forty years)
- 2000: Special Shogi Honor Award (Awarded by the JSA in recognition of winning 1,000 official games as a professional)
- 2000, November: Hyōgo Prefecture Honor Award
- 2008: 50 Years Service Award (Awarded by the JSA in recognition of being an active professional for fifty years)
- 2010: Order of the Rising Sun with Gold and Silver Rays
