= YaneuraOu =

Open source shogi engine

YaneuraOu (shogi engine)
- Original author: Motohiro Isozaki
- Release: 2014; 12 years ago
- Written in: C++
- Operating system: Unix-like, Windows, Web
- Type: Shogi engine
- License: GNU GPL 3.0
- Website: yaneuraou.yaneu.com
- Repository: github.com/yaneurao/YaneuraOu

YaneuraOu (やねうら王, lit. 'King Yaneura') is a free and open source shogi engine. Being one of the first shogi engines to implement an efficiently updatable neural network, it won the 29th annual World Computer Shogi Championship in 2019. It supports the Universal Shogi Interface communication protocol (a dialect of the Universal Chess Interface used by most chess engines), which gives it compatibility with most shogi programs. Lishogi, an open source online shogi server, primarily uses YaneuraOu for its analysis and AI opponent features.

Former World Chess Champion Garry Kasparov (left) standing next to Motohiro Isozaki. Stemming from his chess matches with IBM's Deep Blue supercomputer, Kasparov has become notorious for his involvement in computer chess, which is deeply intertwined with computer shogi due to the similarity of the two games.

== See also ==
- elmo (shogi engine), which uses YaneuraOu's search functions
- List of shogi software#Engines
