= List of shogi software =

This is a list of shogi software (engines and/or graphical user interfaces):

== GUIs ==
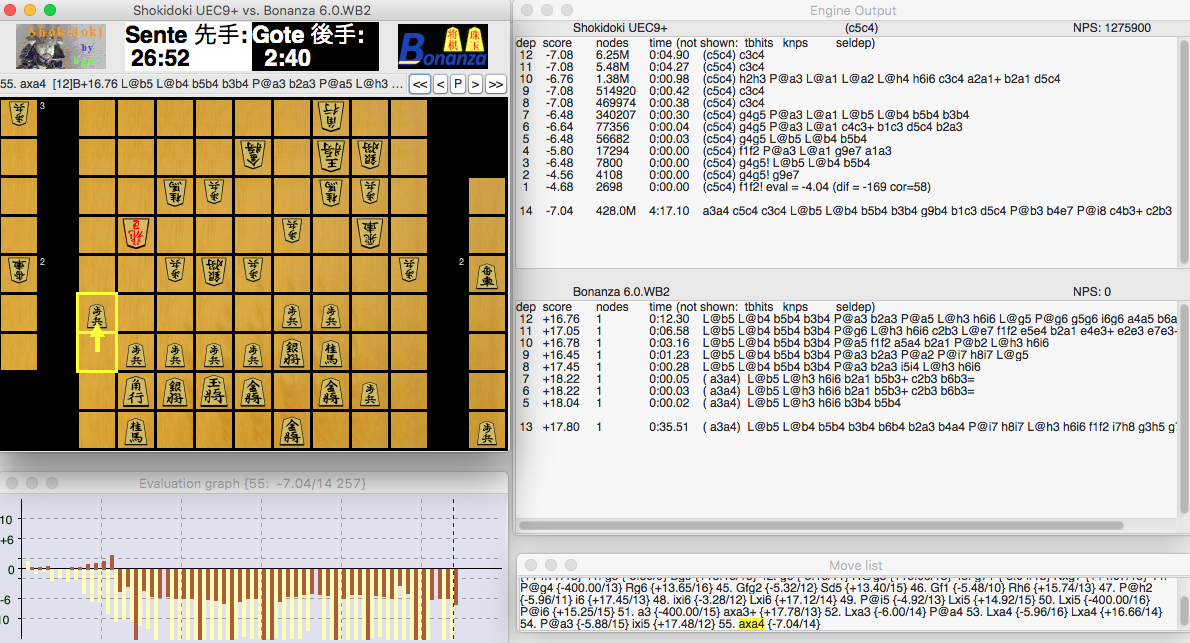
XBoard

- 激指 (Gekisashi)
- 将棋所 (Shogidokoro)
- ShogiGUI
- 将棋ぶらうざQ (Shogi Browser Q)
- XBoard

== Engines ==
- AlphaZero
- Apery
  - Ukamuse (浮かむ瀬 – the 2016 release of Apery)
- BlunderXX
- Bonanza
- elmo
- Fairy Stockfish
- Gikou (技巧)
- GNUShogi
- GPS Shogi
- Honey Waffle
- Laramie
- Lesserkai
- Lightning
- nozomi
- Ponanza
- Ponanza Quartet
- Qhapaq
  - aperypaq (Apery SDT5 with Qhapaq learning)
  - eloqhappa (elmo WCSC27 with Qhapaq learning)
- relmo (elmo WCSC27 + rezero8),
- rezero
- Silent Majority
- Spear
- SSP
- Tanuki (ナイツ・オブ・タヌキ WCSC27, 平成将棋合戦ぽんぽこ SDT5)
- TJshogi
- YaneuraOu (やねうら王)
- Yomita (読み太)

== See also ==
- Computer shogi
- List of chess software
- List of shogi video games
