= Pro Kishi Jinsei Simulation: Shōgi no Hanamichi =

1996 video game

- Cover art
- Developer: Access
- Publisher: Atlus
- Platform: Super Famicom
- Release: JP: February 16, 1996
- Genre: Board
- Modes: Single-player; Multiplayer

Pro Kishi Jinsei Simulation: Shōgi no Hanamichi (プロ棋士人生シミュレーション 将棋の花道) is a shogi (将棋) video game, developed by Access and published by Atlus, which was released exclusively in Japan in 1996.

This was the last game released for the Super Famicom by Atlus.

== See also ==
- Shotest Shogi
- List of shogi video games
