= List of shogi video games =

This is a list of Shogi (将棋) video games. Throughout the years, hundreds of shogi games have been released exclusively in Japan for several consoles. A few have been released outside Japan.

== Sega SG-1000 ==
- Serizawa Yadan no Tsume Shogi - 1983

== Super Cassette Vision ==
- Shogi Nyuumon - 1985

== Sharp X68000 ==
- Morita Shogi II - 1989
- Shogi Seiten - 1992

== MSX ==
- Naitou Kunio no Yume Shogi - 1984
- MSX Shogi - 1985
- Shogi Kyou - 1985
- Shogi Meijin - 1985
- Shogi - 1985
- Gunjin Shogi Gunshin Mars - 1986
- Tanigawa Kouji no Shogi Shinan - 1986
- Shogi - 1986
- Kisei - 1987
- Tanigawa Kouji no Shogi Shinan II - 1988
- Gunjin Shogi - 1988

== Arcade ==
- Shogi (Alpha Denshi)
- Shogi no Tatsujin - 1995
- Tenkaichi Shogi Kai 2 - 2011

== Family Computer ==
- Honshogi: Naitou Kudan Shogi Hiden - 1985
- Morita Shogi - 1987
- Tanigawa Kouji no Shogi Shinan II: Meijin e no Michi - 1988
- Famicom Meijin Sen - 1988
- Tanigawa Kouji no Shogi Shinan III - 1989
- Kaettekita! Gunjin Shogi: Nanya Sore!? - 1989
- Famicom Shogi: Ryuu-Ou-Sen - 1991
- Shogi Meikan '92 - 1992
- Shogi Meikan '93 - 1992

== Famicom Disk System ==
- Tanikawa Koji no Shogi Shinan II - 1987
- Tanigawa Kouji no Shogi Shinan II: Tsume no Shogi - 1988

== Super Famicom ==
- Shodan Morita Shogi - 1991
- Super Shogi - 1992
- Hayazashi Nidan Morita Shogi - 1993
- Shogi Furinkazan - 1993
- BS Super Shogi Problem 1000 - 1994
- Itou Hatasu Mu-Dan no Shogi Dojo - 1994
- Super Shogi 2 - 1994
- Super Gomoku Shogi - 1994 (Nichibutsu)
- Super Tsume Shogi 1000 - 1994
- Honkaku Shogi: Fuuunji Ryuou - 1994
- Shogi Club - 1995
- Kousoku Shikou Shogi-Oh - 1995
- Habu Meijin no Omoshiro Shōgi - 1995 (Tomy Corporation)
- Saikousoku Shikou Shogi Mahjong - 1995
- Hayazashi Nidan Morita Shogi 2 - 1995
- 4 Nin Shōgi - 1995 (Pow)
- Shogi Saikyou - 1995
- Kakinoki Shogi - 1995
- Shin Shogi Club - 1995
- Asahi Shinbun Rensai Katou Hifumi Kudan Shogi Shingiryuu - 1995 (Varie)
- Shogi Sanmai - 1995
- Super Shogi 3: Kitaihei - 1995
- Heisei Gunjin Shogi - 1996
- Shogi Saikyou II: Jissen Taikyoku Hen - 1996
- Pro Kishi Jinsei Simulation: Shōgi no Hanamichi - 1996 (Atlus)
- Table Game Daisyugo!! Shogi Mahjong Hanafuda - 1996 (Varie)
- Katou Hifumi Kudan Shogi Club - 1997

== Panasonic 3DO ==
- Kakinoki Shogi - 1994
- AI Shogi - 1995

== Neo Geo ==
- Shogi no Tatsujin - 1995

== Neo Geo CD ==
- Shogi no Tatsujin - 1995

== NeoGeo Pocket Color ==
- Shogi no Tatsujin - 1998
- Shogi no Tatsujin Color - 1999

== Game Boy ==
- Shogi - 1989
- Tsume Shogi Mondai Teikyou: Shogi Sekai - 1994
- Tsume Shogi Hyakuban Shoubu - 1994
- Hon Shogi - 1994
- Shogi Saikyou - 1994
- Tsume Shogi Kamiki Godan - 1994
- Pocket Shogi - 1998

== Game Boy Color ==
- Shogi Ou - 1998
- Katou Hifumi Kudan no Shogi Kyoushitsu - 1999
- Minna no Shogi: Shokyuuhen - 1999
- Shogi 2 - 1999
- Honkaku Taisen Shogi: Fu - 2000
- Taisen: Tsume Shogi - 2000
- Shogi 3 - 2001

== Game Boy Advance ==
- Morita Shogi Advance - 2001
- Minna no Shogi - 2004

== Turbo CD ==
- Shogi Database Kiyuu - 1995

== PC Engine (TurboGrafx-16) ==
- Shogi Shodan Icchokusen - 1990
- Morita Shogi PC - 1991
- Shogi Shoshinsha Muyou - 1991

== Sega Genesis ==
- Shogi no Hoshi - 1991

== Sega Saturn ==
- Kakinoki Shogi - 1995
- Kanazawa Shogi - 1995
- Senryaku Shogi - 1995
- Shogi Matsuri - 1995
- AI Shogi - 1995
- Kiwamu II - 1996
- AI Shogi 2 - 1998
- Yoshimura Shogi - 1998
- Honkaku Shogi Shinan Wakamatsu Shougi Jyuku / Honkaku Shogi Yubinan - 1998 (SIMS)
- Mario Mushano no Chou-Shogi Juku - 1998

== Nintendo 64 ==
- Saikyō Habu Shōgi - 1996
- Morita Shogi 64 - 1998
- AI Shogi 3 - 1998

== Nintendo DS ==
- Daredemo Asobi Taizen / 42 All-Time Classics / Clubhouse Games - 2005
- Appare! Shogi Jiisan - 2005
- Daredemo Kantan! Watanabe Akira no Tsume Shogi - 2006
- Itsu Demo Doko Demo Dekiru Shogi: AI Shogi DS - 2006
- Sekai no Shogi - 2007
- Saikyou Toudai Shogi DSi - 2007
- 1500DS Spirits Vol. 2: Shogi - 2007
- Asonde Shogi ga Tsuyoku naru!! Ginsei Shogi DS - 2007
- Wi-Fi Taiō: Morita Shogi DS - 2007
- 1500DS Spirits: Shogi V - 2009
- at Shogi: Challenge Spirits - 2009
- Saikyou Gensei Shogi - 2009
- Habu Yoshiharu Shōgi de Kitaeru: Ketsudanryoku DS - 2009
- at Enta! Taisen Shogi 2 - 2010
- Hachi-One Diver DS: Naruzou-kun Hasami Shogi - 2010
- Shogi World Champion: Gekisashi DS - 2010
- Toudai Shogi: Meijinsen Dojo DS - 2011
- Ginsei Tsume Shogi - 2011

== Wii ==
- Saikyou Ginsei Shogi - 2008
- Tsuushin Taikyoku: Hayazashi Shogi Sandan - 2008
- Wi-Fi Taiō: Gensen Table Games Wii - 2008

== Nintendo 3DS ==
- Asonde Shogi Ga Tsuyokunaru! Ginsei Shogi DX - 2015

== Wii U ==
- Ginsei Shogi: Kyoutendo Toufuu Raijin - 2016

== Nintendo Switch ==
- Ginsei Shogi: Kyoutendo Toufuu Raijin - 2017
- Asonde Shogi ga Tsuyoku Naru Ginsei Shogi DX - 2017
- Hifumi Katou-Supervised Hifumin’s Shogi Dojo - 2018
- Kanazawa Shogi ~ Level 300 ~ - 2018
- Dobutsu Shogi World - 2019
- Please Teach Me Onedari Shogi - 2019
- Clubhouse Games: 51 Worldwide Classics - 2020
- Kishi Fujii Souta no Shogi Training - 2020
- Kagawa Manao to Futari de Shogi - 2021

== PlayStation ==
- Kakinoki Shogi - 1994
- Kiwame: Taikyoku Shogi - 1995
- Kanazawa Shogi '95 - 1995
- AI Shogi - 1995
- Senryaku Shogi - 1995
- Shogi Joryuu Meijin Kuraisen - 1995
- Kiwame Daidougi: Tsumuya Tsumazaruya - 1996
- AI Shogi 2 - 1997
- Katou Hifumi Kudan: Shogi Club - 1997
- Mario Mushano no Chou-Shogi-Juku - 1997
- I'Max Shogi II - 1997
- Morita Shogi - 1997
- Honkaku Shogi: Shogi O - 1998
- Yoshimura Shogi - 1998
- Kakinoki Shogi II - 1998
- Shogi Saikyou 2 - 1998
- The Shogi - 1998
- Saikyo Todai Shogi - 1998
- Saikyo Todai Shogi 2 - 1999
- Saikyou no Shogi - 1999
- Shogi Saikyou: Pro ni Manabu - 1999
- Tanaka Torahiko no Uru Tora Ryuu Shogi - 1999
- AI Shogi 2 Deluxe - 1999
- AI Shogi 2000 - 1999
- Shogi II - 1999
- Kanazawa Shogi Tsuki - 1999
- Morita Kazuo no Shogi Dojo - 1999
- The Shogi 2 - 2000
- 0 Kara no Shogi: Shogi Youchien Ayumi Kumi R - 2000
- Kidou Senshi Gundam: The Gunjin Shogi - 2001
- Sekai Saikyou Ginsei Shogi - 2001
- Honkaku Shogi Shinan - 2001
- Family Shogi: Super Strong - 2002
- Minna no Shogi: Chuukyuuhen - 2002
- Minna no Shogi: Jokyuuhen - 2002
- Minna no Shogi: Shokyuuhen - 2002
- AI Shogi Selection - 2002
- Family Gunjin Shogi - 2002
- Saikyou Ginsei Shogi 2 - 2002

== PlayStation 2 ==
- Morita Shogi - 2000
- Kakinoki Shogi IV - 2000
- Toudai Shogi: Shikenbisha Dojo - 2000
- Choukousoku Shogi - 2001
- Kousoku Tanigawa Shogi - 2001
- Saikyou Toudai Shogi 3 - 2001
- Saikyou Toudai Shogi 4 - 2002
- Saikyou Toudai Shogi Special - 2002
- Internet Shogi - 2002
- The Shogi - 2002
- Shogi - 2003
- Saikyou Toudai Shogi 2003 - 2003
- Shogi World Champion Gekihashi 2 - 2003
- AI Shogi 2003 - 2003
- Shogi 4 - 2004
- Taisen(1) Shogi - 2004
- Saikyou Toudai Shogi 2004 - 2004
- Saikyou Toudai Shogi 5 - 2004
- Sekei Saikyou Ginsei Shogi 4 - 2004
- Toudai Shogi: Jouseki Dojo Kanketsuhen - 2004
- Saikyou Toudai Shogi Special II - 2005
- Saikyo Shogi Gekisashi Special - 2006
- Saikyou Toudai Shogi 6 - 2006

== PlayStation 3 ==
- Sekai Saikyou Ginsei Shogi: Fuuum Ryouko Raiden - 2011
- Saikyou Ginsei Shogi 7 - TBA
- Shogi World Champion Gekisashi (working title) - TBA
- Value 2000 Shogi - TBA

== PlayStation Portable ==
- AI Shogi - 2005
- Saikyou Toudai Shogi Portable - 2005
- Isshou Asoberu Todai Shogi: Sakidzume Shogi Dojo - 2007
- Shogi ga Tsuyokunaru: Gekishi - Jouseki Dojo - 2007
- Saikyou Shogi Bonanza - 2008
- Saikyou Toudai Shogi Deluxe - 2009
- Shogi - 2010
- The Shogi - 2010
- Ginsei Shogi Portable - 2010
- Toudai Shogi: Mejinsen Dojo - 2010
- Shogi World Champion: Gekisashi Portable - 2010

== PlayStation Vita ==
- Ginsei Shogi: Kyoutendo Toufuu Raijin - 2012

== Dreamcast ==
- Tanaka Torahiko no Uru Toraryuu Shogi - 1999
- Morita no Saikyou Shogi - 1999
- Net Versus Shogi - 2001

== PC ==
- Buruge Teki Datsui Shogi - 2001
- Shotest Shogi - 2008
- AI Shogi Version 16 for Windows - 2008
- IT Shogi - 2009
- Sekai Saikyou Ginsei Shogi 8 - 2009
- AI Shogi Version 17 for Windows - 2009
- Korekara wa Hajimeru no Tame no Shogi - 2009
- Motto Ue o Mezasu Jin no Tame no Shogi - 2009
- Shin Toudai Shogi Musou 2 - 2009
- Shogi Revolution: Gekisashi 9 - 2009
- AI Shogi Gold 2 - 2009
- AI Shogi Gold 3 - 2010
- Sekai Saikyou Ginsei Shogi 7 New Standard - 2010
- Sekai Saikyou Ginsei Shogi 9: Kazagumo Fuuun Ryuuko - 2010
- Ginsei Shogi Premium - 2010
- Shogi World Champion Gekisashi 10 - 2010
- Sekai Saikyou Ginsei Shogi 8: New Standard - 2011
- AI Shogi Version 18 for Windows - 2011
- GNU Shogi

== NEC PC98 ==
- Morita Kazuro no Shogi - 1985
- Dennou Shogi: Noboru Ryuu 2 - 1991

== Xbox ==
- Yonenaga Kunio no Shogi Seminar - 2002

== Xbox 360 ==
- Shotest Shogi - 2008

== iPhone/iPod ==
- 5x5 Shogi - 2008
- Kakinoki Shogi - 2008
- IT Gunjin Shogi - 2009
- IT Shogi - 2009
- Shogi Z - 2009
- Ginsei Shogi - 2010
- Gunjin shogi: First - 2010
- Hasami Shogi - 2010
- Kakinoki Shogi for iPad - 2010
- Bonanza - 2010
- Bonanza HD - 2010
- Morita Shogi HD - 2010
- Shogi Lv.100 - 2010
- Shogi Lv.100 for iPad (Japanese Chess) - 2010
- Shogi Live - 2010
- Shogi Z XL: Japanese Chess - 2011
- hi Gunjin Shogi - 2011
- i HABU Shogi - 2011

== Mac OS X ==
- Shogi Demon - 2006

== Android ==
- Shogi Lv.100 Lite (JPN Chess) - 2011
- Animal Shogi - 2012
- Kanasawa Shogi
- Shogi Wars

== Bandai Pippin ==
- AI Shogi - 1996

== WonderSwan ==
- Shogi Toryuumon - 1999
- Morita Shogi for WonderSwan - 1999

== See also ==
- List of shogi software
