= Habu Meijin no Omoshiro Shōgi =

1995 video game

- Cover art
- Developer: Access
- Publisher: Tomy Corporation
- Composer: Cube
- Platform: Super Famicom
- Release: JP: March 31, 1995
- Genre: Board
- Modes: Single-player; Multiplayer

Habu Meijin no Omoshiro Shōgi (羽生名人のおもしろ将棋) is a Shogi (将棋) video game, developed by Access and published by Tomy Corporation. It was exclusively released in Japan for the Super Famicom in 1995.

This game is endorsed and supervised by Yoshiharu Habu.

== Reception ==
On release, Famicom Tsūshin scored the game a 25 out of 40.

== See also ==
- Meijin (shogi)
- List of shogi video games
- Saikyō Habu Shōgi, Nintendo 64 video game featuring Yoshiharu Habu
- Habu Yoshiharu Shōgi de Kitaeru: Ketsudanryoku DS, Nintendo DS video game featuring Yoshiharu Habu
- Shotest Shogi
