= Issei Takazaki =

Japanese shogi player (born 1987)

- Native name: 髙﨑一生
- Born: February 12, 1987 (age 38)
- Hometown: Nichinan, Miyazaki

Career
- Achieved professional status: October 1, 2005 (aged 18)
- Badge Number: 257
- Rank: 7-dan
- Teacher: Kunio Yonenaga (9-dan)
- Meijin class: C1
- Ryūō class: 4

Websites
- JSA profile page

Issei Takazaki (高崎 一生, Takazaki Issei; born February 12, 1987) is a Japanese professional shogi player ranked 7-dan.

== Early life, amateur shogi and apprentice professional ==
Issei Takazaki was born in Nichinan, Miyazaki, on February 12, 1987. As a sixth-grade student at Miyazaki Public Omiya Elementary School, he defeated Kōhei Funae to win the 23rd Elementary School Student Meijin Tournament in 1998, and he was accepted into the Japan Shogi Association's apprentice school in September of that same year under the guidance of professional shogi player Kunio Yonenaga. At the beginning of his shogi apprenticeship, Takazaki commuted from his hometown to the Japan Shogi Association's headquarters in Tokyo alone by plane to participate in the regularly scheduled meetings and games, but also stayed at Yonenaga's home as a live-in apprentice for a period of time.

Takazaki was promoted to 1-dan in April 2000 and then to 3-dan in 2002. He obtained full professional status and corresponding rank of 4-dan in October 2005 after finishing tied for first in the 37th 3-dan league with a record of 13 wins and 5 losses, thus becoming the first person from Miyazaki Prefecture to become a professional shogi player.

== Shogi professional ==
=== Promotion history ===
Takazaki's promotion history is as follows:

- 6-kyū: 1998
- 1-dan: 2000
- 4-dan: October 1, 2005
- 5-dan: February 2, 2010
- 6-dan: May 15, 2012
- 7-dan: September 18, 2020
