= Kōhei Funae =

Japanese shogi player

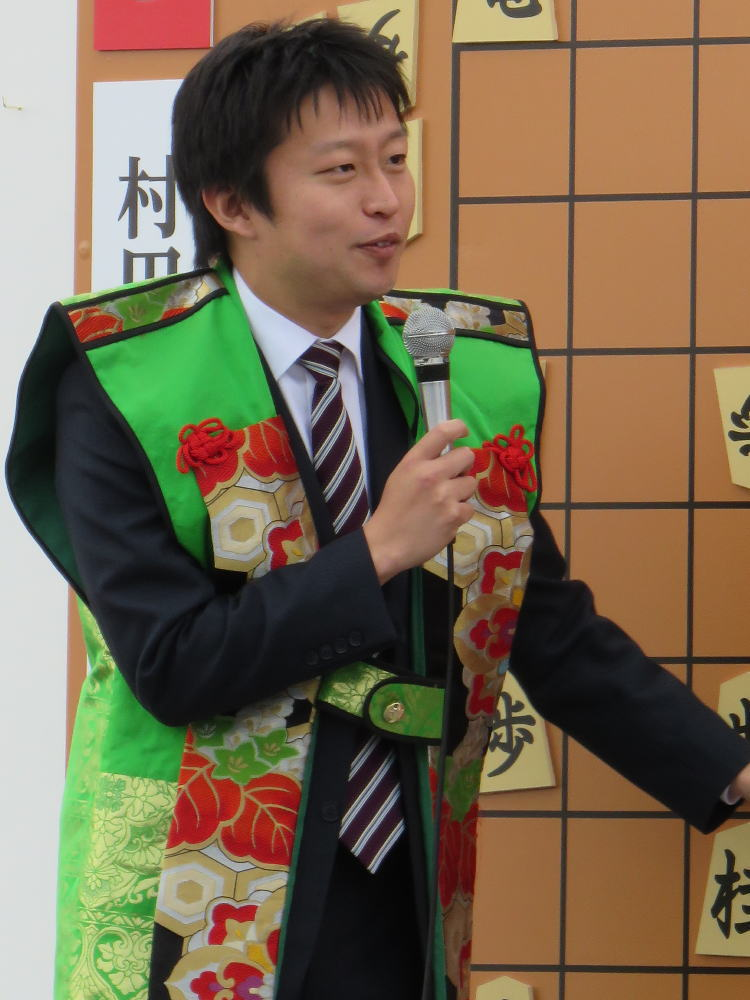
- Funae at a human shogi event in November 2015.
- Native name: 船江恒平
- Born: April 27, 1987 (age 38)
- Hometown: Kakogawa, Hyōgo

Career
- Achieved professional status: October 1, 2010 (aged 23)
- Badge Number: 281
- Rank: 7-dan
- Teacher: Keita Inoue (9-dan)
- Tournaments won: 2
- Meijin class: C1
- Ryūō class: 4

Websites
- JSA profile page

Kōhei Funae (船江 恒平, Funae Kōhei; born April 27, 1987) is a Japanese professional shogi player ranked 7-dan.

== Early life, amateur shogi and apprentice professional ==
Funae was born on April 27, 1987, in Kakogawa, Hyōgo. He learned how to play shogi from his grandfather when he was about five years old. When he was a second-grade student elementary school student, Funae started to regularly go to the Kakogawa Shogi Center where he met shogi professional Keita Inoue for the first time. Funae finished runner-up to fellow future professional Issei Takazaki in the 23rd Elementary School Student Meijin Tournament in 1998. Later that same year, Funae entered the Japan Shogi Association's apprentice school under Inoue's guidance at the rank of 6-kyū.

Funae steadily advanced through the apprentice school ranks and was promoted to 1-kyū in 2001. His progress, however, slowed at that point and he wasn't promoted to 1-dan until March 2003. Funae was promoted to the rank 3-dan in 2006, and entered the 39th 3-dan League in April 2006. Funae's progress, however, once again slowed and he did not obtain full professional status and the corresponding rank of 4-dan until October 2010 after he finished second in the 47th 3-dan League with a record of 13 wins and 5 losses.

== Shogi professional ==
Funae's first tournament victory as a shogi professional came in 2011 when he defeated Hiroshi Miyamoto (still an apprentice professional 3-dan at the time) 2 games to 1 to win the 1st Kakogawa Seiryū Tournament for young professionals.

In March–April 2013, Funae was one of five shogi professionals to play against five computer shogi programs in the 2nd Denō Match. Funae played against the program Tsutsukana and lost in 184 moves. Funae played Tsutsukana once again in a "revenge match" in December 2013 and this time Funae won in 85 moves.

Funae's other tournament victory came in 2016 when he defeated Shōta Chida to win the 1st Jōshū Yamada Challenge Cup sponsored by Japanese electronics retailer Yamada Denki.

=== Promotion history ===
Funae's promotion history is as follows:

- 6-kyū: September 1998
- 3-dan: April 2006
- 4-dan: October 1, 2010
- 5-dan: March 6, 2012
- 6-dan: December 28, 2016
- 7-dan: March 12, 2024

=== Titles and other championships ===
Funae has yet to appear in a major title match, but he has won two non-major title tournaments.

== Tsume Shogi Solving Competition ==
Funae won the 7th Tsume Shogi Solving Competition in 2010 while he was still an apprentice professional 3-dan; he was the only participant to finish with a perfect score of 100.
