= Shin'ichi Satō (shogi) =

Japanese shogi player

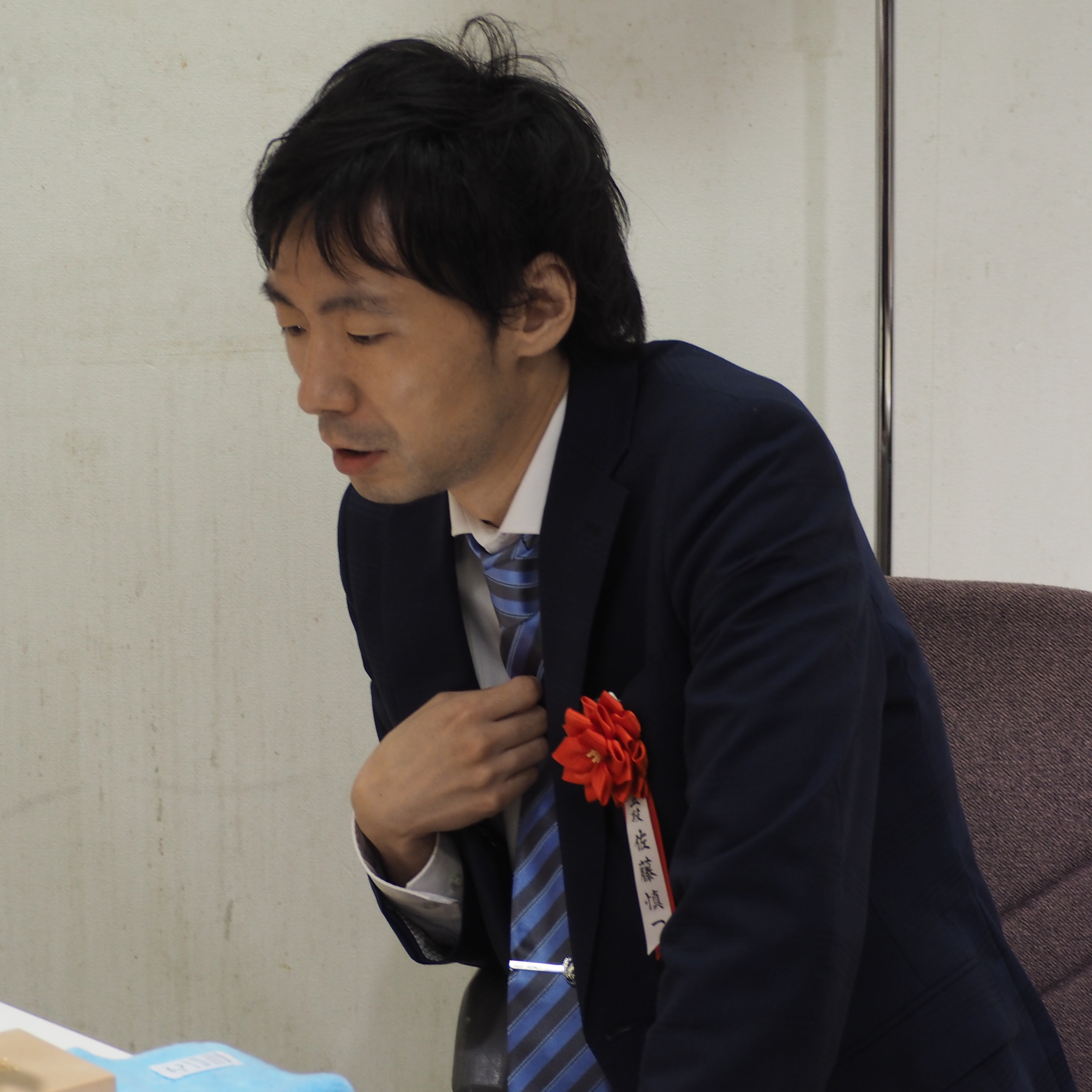
- Native name: 佐藤慎一
- Born: August 16, 1982 (age 43)
- Hometown: Nerima, Japan

Career
- Achieved professional status: October 1, 2008 (aged 26)
- Badge Number: 271
- Rank: 6-dan
- Teacher: Shōji Kenmochi (9-dan)
- Meijin class: C2
- Ryūō class: 6

Websites
- JSA profile page
- Official website

Shin'ichi Satō (佐藤 慎一, Satō Shin'ichi; born August 16, 1982) is a Japanese professional shogi player ranked 6-dan.

== Shogi professional ==
=== Theoretical contributions ===
Satō developed the Extreme Rushing Silver (極限早繰り銀) opening strategy.

=== Promotion history ===
The promotion history for Satō is as follows:

- 6-kyū: September 1994
- 4-dan: October 1, 2008
- 5-dan: January 16, 2015
- 6-dan: July 23, 2024

== Publications ==
Sato has published several books and other articles on the "Extreme Rushing Silver" opening strategy.

- Satō, Shin'ichi (August 2017). "Jōseki no Tsugi no Itte ｢Kyokugen Hayakurigin Senpō｣" 定跡次の一手「極限早繰り銀戦法｣ [Next Move Opening strategy problems: Extreme Rushing Silver strategy]. Shōgi Sekai (in Japanese). Supplemental booklet. Mynavi Publishing.
- Satō, Shin'ichi (2018). Shijō Saisoku no Kōgeki Senpō Kyokugen Hayakurigin 史上最速の攻撃戦法 極限早繰り銀 [Extreme Rushing Silver: The Fastest Attacking Strategy in History] (in Japanese). Mynavi Publishing. ISBN 978-4-8399-6420-7.
