= Elmo (shogi engine) =

Computer shogi evaluation function and book file

elmo (stylized as elmo, a blend of elastic and monkey) is a computer shogi evaluation function and book file (joseki) created by Makoto Takizawa (瀧澤誠). It is designed to be used with a third-party shogi alpha–beta search engine.

Combined with the yaneura ou (やねうら王) search, Elmo became the champion of the 27th annual World Computer Shogi Championship (世界コンピュータ将棋選手権) in May 2017. However, in the Den Ō tournament (将棋電王戦) in November 2017, Elmo was not able to make it to the top five engines losing to 平成将棋合戦ぽんぽこ (1st), shotgun (2nd), ponanza (3rd), 読み太 (4th), and Qhapaq_conflated (5th). It won the World Championship again in 2021.

In October 2017, DeepMind claimed that its program AlphaZero, after two hours of massively parallel training (700,000 steps or 10,300,000 games), began to exceed Elmo's performance. With a full nine hours of training (24 million games), AlphaZero defeated Elmo in a 100-game match, winning 90, losing 8, and drawing two.

Elmo is free software that may be run on shogi engine interface GUIs such as Shogidokoro and ShogiGUI.

== Shogi theory ==
elmo castle
☖ pieces in hand: –

9	8	7	6	5	4	3	2	1
									1
									2
									3
									4
									5
歩		歩							6
	歩		歩						7
	角	玉	銀						8
香	桂	金							9

☗ pieces in hand: –

A new castle has appeared in computer games featuring elmo, which has been named elmo castle (エルモ囲い erumogakoi). Subsequently, the castle has been used by professional shogi players and recently featured in a book on a new Anti–Ranging Rook Rapid Attack strategy.
