= Shotest Shogi =

2008 video game

- Developer(s): AI Factory / Rubicon Development
- Publisher(s): AI Factory / Rubicon Development
- Designer(s): AI Factory / Rubicon Development
- Engine: Shotest
- Platform(s): Windows, Xbox 360 (XBLA)
- Release: June 2008 (Windows); September 10, 2008 (Xbox 360)
- Genre(s): Board game
- Mode(s): Single player, Multiplayer (Xbox 360)

Shotest Shogi is a 2008 shogi AI engine, made by Jeff Rollason, which was made into a video game for Windows and Xbox Live Arcade developed by British studios AI Factory and Rubicon Development. It provides a 3D environment designed to recreate a traditional Japanese room. The Xbox version includes a tutorial system, and all versions include an option to use a Western-style set of playing pieces for players who are unfamiliar with Japanese characters.

Screenshot from the Xbox 360 version

The AI engine has been competing in the Computer Shogi Championships since 1997, and has achieved the highest ranking of any Western entry in all championships. It has competed in 12 World Championships, 2 Invitation ISF tournaments (Tokyo) and 3 Olympiads, winning one of the latter. In all it has beaten 3 different world champions (Gekisashi, IS-Shogi and YSS) on 5 occasions in the year they were world champion. A game running Shotest was released on July 23, 2008, for Xbox Live Arcade in Japan. It was released in the United States on September 10, 2008. Although the game is playable entirely in English, Chinese, Korean and EMEA languages, there is currently no announced release date for other territories, but this will be in the fall period.

The Japanese unannounced release on 28 July 2008 saw Shotest Shogi immediately top of the current Japanese Xbox live chart.

Two PC versions are already on release, one in Japan and one in the UK (see "Shotest Shogi Official Website" below). These do not include the advanced teaching system used by the Xbox version.
