= LC0 =

LC0 may refer to:

== Places ==
- Mid-Atlantic Regional Spaceport Launch Complex 0 (LC-0), a spacelaunch rocket site in Virginia, USA
- Left Coulee Airport (FAA airport code LC0), Winifred, Fergus County, Montana, USA; see List of airports in Montana

== Other uses ==
- Leela Chess Zero (Lc0, lc0), an open-source chess engine computer program
- LC_{0}, the Maximum Tolerable Concentration amount for acute toxicity
- BYD Auto (WMI code LC0) in vehicle identification numbers (VINs)

== See also ==
- LC (disambiguation)
- LCO (disambiguation)
- ICO (disambiguation)
