= ICO =

ICO or Ico may refer to:

== Science and technology ==
- ICO (file format), a file format used for icon images in Microsoft Windows
- Index of Central Obesity, a measurement of abdominal obesity
- Indian Computing Olympiad, an annual computer programming competition
- Initial coin offering, a funding process involving a new cryptocurrency
- Intermediate circular orbit, a type of satellite orbit

== Organizations ==
- ICO Global Communications, a mobile satellite services company based in Reston, Virginia, US
- Catalan Ornithological Institute (Institut Català d'Ornitologia), a non-profit for the study of birds in Catalonia
- Illinois College of Optometry, a private college in Chicago, Illinois, US
- Information Commission's Office, a UK regulator
- Institute of Contemporary Observation, a Chinese non-governmental organization
- International Coffee Organization, a group for enhancing cooperation between nations dealing in coffee
- International Commission for Optics, a commission for knowledge in optics
- International Communist Opposition, a group of critics of the Communist movement
- International Council of Ophthalmology, a body serving associations of ophthalmologists
- Instituto de Crédito Oficial, a Spanish state-owned development bank
- Irish Chamber Orchestra, a chamber orchestra in Ireland
- Irish College of Ophthalmologists, the national body for ophthalmology training in Ireland
- Israel Chamber Orchestra, a chamber orchestra in Israel

== Places ==
- Cocos (Keeling) Islands (ITU code: ICO), an Australian territory in the Indian Ocean
- Icó, a town in Ceará, Brazil

== Other uses ==
- Ico, a 2001 PS2 action-adventure video game
- Ico, the Brave Horse, a 1983 Argentine animated film
- Ico Hitrec (1911–1946), Croatian football player

== See also ==
- IKO (disambiguation)
- LCO (disambiguation)
- LC0 (disambiguation)
- ICOS (disambiguation)
