= Iko =

Iko or IKO may refer to:

- Iko (band), an English rock band
- Iko language, of Nigeria
- IK Oskarshamn, an ice hockey club from Oskarshamn, Sweden
- Nikolski Air Station (IATA code), Alaska, US
- International Karate Organization Kyokushin-kaikan - shortened IKO - one of sports organizations for Kyokushin Karate
- International Kiteboarding Organization, a kiteboarding education and certification body

== People ==
- Iko Carreira (1933–2000), the first Defense Minister of Angola from 1975 to 1980
- Iko Maran (1915–1999), Estonian playwright and children's book author
- Iko Mirković, Montenegrin politician and historian
- Iko Uwais (born 1983), Indonesian actor

== See also ==
- "Iko Iko", a 1953 song by James "Sugar Boy" Crawford
- Ico (disambiguation)
