= Fish stock =

Fish stock or stock fish may also refer to:

- Fish stocks are subpopulations of a particular species of fish.
- Fish stock (food), liquid made by boiling fish bones with vegetables, used as a base for fish soups and sauces
- Fish stocking, the practice of raising fish in a hatchery and releasing them into a river, lake, or ocean
- Stockfish, unsalted fish, especially cod, dried by cold air
- Stockfish (chess), an open source UCI chess engine
