= LCO =

LCO may refer to:

- Lac Courte Oreilles Band of Lake Superior Chippewa Indians
- Lague Airport's IATA airport code, Republic of the Congo
- Las Cachorras Orientales, a Japanese professional wrestling tag team
- Las Campanas Observatory, an astronomical observatory in Chile
- Las Cumbres Observatory, a network of astronomical observatories
- Launch Control Operator/Officer
- Lawn Care Operator
- League of Legends Circuit Oceania
- Legislative Competence Order
- Libraries Connect Ohio
- lipochitin oligosaccharide / lipo-chitin oligosaccharide
- Lithium cobalt oxide, a cathode material for lithium-ion batteries
- Lithuanian Chamber Orchestra
- Local Cable Operator, resell for multiple-system operator
- London Chamber Orchestra
- London Contemporary Orchestra

== See also ==
- LC0 (disambiguation)
- ICO (disambiguation)
- LCOS
