= Stafford Gambit =

Chess opening

Position: a8 black rook, c8 black bishop, d8 black queen, e8 black king, f8 black bishop, h8 black rook, a7 black pawn, b7 black pawn, c7 black pawn, d7 black pawn, f7 black pawn, g7 black pawn, h7 black pawn, c6 black knight, f6 black knight, e5 white knight, e4 white pawn, a2 white pawn, b2 white pawn, c2 white pawn, d2 white pawn, f2 white pawn, g2 white pawn, h2 white pawn, a1 white rook, b1 white knight, c1 white bishop, d1 white queen, e1 white king, f1 white bishop, h1 white rook
- Moves: 1.e4 e5 2.Nf3 Nf6 3.Nxe5 Nc6
- ECO: C42
- Parent: Petrov's Defense
- Synonym: Stafford Variation

The Stafford Gambit is a sharp and irregular chess opening for Black that can arise from Petrov's Defense. It is characterized by the moves:

1. e4 e5
2. Nf3 Nf6
3. Nxe5 Nc6

Black offers a pawn on the third move in exchange for rapid development, open diagonals for the bishops, and immediate tactical pressure against White's kingside. While the gambit has a long historical pedigree, it remained obscure until the early 2020s, when it gained significant popularity in online blitz chess through the games of American International Master Eric Rosen.

== History ==
The opening is named after Joseph Stafford, a correspondence chess player who won a notable six-move game with the line in 1950. The earliest recorded instance of the gambit dates back to a simultaneous exhibition in 1857 by Howard Staunton, who lost the game while playing as Black.

For decades, the Stafford Gambit was rarely seen in tournament play due to its poor theoretical standing. Its heyday began in the 2020s as a "surprise weapon" for online play, where its numerous tactical traps proved effective under fast time controls. In December 2024, Eric Rosen famously used the Stafford Gambit to defeat grandmaster Sergey Erenburg in 14 moves during the FIDE World Blitz Chess Championship.

== Theory and variations ==
The main line proceeds with 4.Nxc6 dxc6. Black accepts a damaged pawn structure (doubled c-pawns) and a material deficit of one pawn. In return, the d-file is opened for the queen and the bishop on c8 gains an active diagonal.

=== Main continuations for White ===
- 5.d3: The most solid and commonly recommended response. White protects the pawn on e4 and prepares for development. Black usually responds with 5...Bc5.
- 5.e5: A more aggressive try that aims to harass the knight on f6, but which can lead to complications after 5...Ne4. This was the line played in the original 1950 Lowens–Stafford game, where White blundered with 6.d3?? and resigned after 6...Bc5!, as 7.dxe4 would be followed by 7...Bxf2+ winning the queen, whereas 7.Be3 would be followed with 7...Bxe3 8.fxe3 Qh4+.
- 5.Nc3: A flexible developing move; if Black plays 5...Bc5, White must be careful to avoid traps involving ...Ng4.

=== Tactical traps ===
The Stafford Gambit is noted for "hope chess" traps where White's most natural-looking moves are often losing. A common theme involves the "Rosen Trap": 5.d3 Bc5 6.Bg5? Nxe4! If White plays 7.Bxd8, Black delivers checkmate with 7...Bxf2+ 8.Ke2 Bg4#.

== Evaluation ==
Modern chess engines such as Stockfish evaluate the starting position of the Stafford Gambit as roughly +1.5 to +2.0 in favor of White. High-level players generally consider it unsound for classical chess because precise play by White (often involving moves like c3 and d4 to neutralize the bishop on c5) leaves Black with no compensation for the missing pawn.
