= ICOS (disambiguation) =

ICOS was an American biotechnology company.

ICOS may also refer to:

- ICOS (gene), a gene which encodes the protein CD278
- Integrated Carbon Observation System, a research infrastructure
- Integrated cavity output spectroscopy, a type of laser absorption spectrometry
- International Council of Onomastic Sciences, an academic organization
- The International Council on Security and Development, an international think tank
- Irish Co-operative Organisation Society, a business association

== See also ==
- ICO (disambiguation)
