= Institute of Contemporary Observation =

Chinese non-governmental organization

The Institute of Contemporary Observation (Simplified Chinese: 深圳当代社会观察研究所), founded on March 18, 2001, is a Chinese NGO committed to labor rights development and Corporate Social Responsibility. It promotes sustainable development in China through research, labor rights advocacy, social responsibility consultation, education and training, legal aid, community service, etc.

ICO monitors workers' living conditions and development and attempts to improve labor rights, promote the development of public policy and law, foster civil power for development, advance commerce, improve labor and capital relations and advance the harmonious development of society and economy. At the same time, ICO works with multinational corporations (MNC), international organizations and local institutions intimately to help MNCs enforce international labor standards within their supply-chain factories.

== Work ==
ICO works mainly in three areas: civil think tank, consultation, and education and training.

=== Civil think tank ===
Since its establishment, ICO has collaborated with many international organizations, such as the World Bank, International Labour Organization and Oxfam International on research about the Corporate Social Responsibility situation in China. Its own publication includes "migrant workers in South China" (边缘人), "Multinational Corporate Social Responsibility and the Chinese Society" (跨国公司社会责任和中国社会), "The Price of One's Body: A study of workplace injury compensation in China" (身体的价格－中国工伤索赔研究), "A Social Structure of Lost Entitlements" (权利失落的社会结构). ICO also has its own labor research newsletter, FORUM.

Besides publications, ICO also tries to influence the decision-makers through public debates. During 2003–2006, ICO has participated in media discussions about "Labor Shortage", "Corporate Social Responsibility", "New Generation Migrant Workers" and "Minimum Wage Standards". Three annual conferences advocating decent work and labor rights were also organized by ICO during 2004 to 2006.

=== Consultation ===
ICO has conducted social risk assessments in the Chinese supply-chain factories of several multi-national corporations.

=== Education and training ===
ICO carries out various training programs both within communities and for corporations. It has provided management capacity building training programs in corporations like NIKE, Dupond, Burberry, Fuji Xerox, Perlos and Stella international.

In 2004, UC Berkeley and ICO co-founded the Migrant Workers' Community College. Although the college was closed down in 2007 due to registration difficulties with the Chinese government, it has been attended by more than 10,000 migrant workers during these years. Today, ICO still provides legal aid, psychological advice and emergency assistance through its "Worker's Hotline" and "Migrant Workers Support Center".

== Honors and awards ==
ICO received the "Best Organization for Public Good" award from the South Window Magazine (南风窗)in 2003. And in 2005, ICO was named as one of the "Top Ten Excellent Cases on Sustainable Development" in China, co-organized by the Economic Observer and Shell Group.
