= Lague Airport =

- IATA: LCO; ICAO: FCBL

Summary
- Serves: Akana, Republic of the Congo
- Elevation AMSL: 2,720 ft (830 m)
- Coordinates: 02°27′S 14°32′E

Map
- Location of airport in the Republic of the Congo

Runways
Direction	Length		Surface
Direction	m	ft	Surface
11/29	1,250	4,101	Grass
- Source: GCM Landings

Lague Airport (IATA: LCO, ICAO: FCBL) is an airstrip serving Akana, Republic of the Congo.
