= Iko Maran =

Estonian playwright and children's writer

Iko Maran (26 February 1915 – 12 November 1999) was an Estonian playwright and children's book author.

== Early life ==
Maran was born in Pskov to ethnic Estonian parents. His father was killed in the First World War. His family left Russia in 1922 for the newly independent nation of Estonia, settling in the town of Härgla in the parish of Juuru. Maran went to high school in Tallinn, and studied at the University of Tartu from 1936 to 1940. During the German occupation, he scraped by on odd jobs.

During the latter half of the 1940s he was an employee of Eesti Raadio, and later worked as a literary director at various Tallinn theaters, including the Estonian Drama Theatre. He joined the Estonian Writers' Union in 1958 and the Estonian Theater Association in 1967.

== Literary career ==
Maran began his literary career in partnership with Bernhard Lülle. Under the collective pseudonym of Lall Kahas, they authored a drama, The Burning Car ('Põlev alus'), which premiered in Valga in 1946. It appeared in printed form in the same year, and the duo went on to write further plays both for children and adults.

In 1949 the pair wrote their first children's book, Friends ('Sõbrad'), which would be followed by three more. Their books were credited with "broadening the horizons of reading for Estonian children", perhaps because they showed pre-Soviet Estonia in a positive light, a rarity in the Stalinist era.

After 1964, Maran wrote independently and published his works under his own name. His greatest success came with the fairy-tale Londiste, Real Name Phant ('Londiste, õige nimega Vant', 1972) and its sequel Hot Ice Cream ('Tuline jäätis', 1976).

In 1974 he was awarded the Juhan Smuul Prize, the State Prize of the Estonian SSR, for his contributions to children's literature.

== Translations ==
Maran's books have been translated into several languages, principally Russian and German. Foreign translations of his works were generally produced in Tallinn without the involvement of foreign publishers, leading some scholars to characterize these translations as pseudoreception, a process whereby state-sponsored Soviet literature was unilaterally translated and exported into target languages without any involvement or interest from the target audience. Hot Ice Cream was translated into English in 1983 by Aino Jõgi, and is the only one of Maran's works to have received an English translation. Maran himself worked as a translator from Russian into Estonian.

== Bibliography ==
- (Lall Kahas) Põlev alus. Draama 5 vaatuses. ('The Burning Car. A Drama in 5 Acts'). Tallinn: Rahvaloomingu Keskmaja 1946. 53 S.
- (Lall Kahas) Sõbrad ('Friends'). Tallinn: Ilukirjandus ja Kunst 1949. 180 S.
- (Lall Kahas) Aknad valla. Näidend kolmes vaatuses. ('Windows Open. A Play in Two Acts'). Tallinn: Ilukirjandus ja Kunst 1946. 112 S.
- (Lall Kahas) Pisilugusid Jalukselt ('Short Stories of Jalukse'). Tallinn: Eesti Riiklik Kirjastus 1956. 138 S.
- (Lall Kahas) Pähklimägi. Komöödia 4 vaatuses ('Walnut Hill. A Comedy in four Acts'). Tallinn: Eesti Riiklik Kirjastus 1957. 71 S.
- (Lall Kahas) Tere jälle! ('Hello Newcomers!'). Tallinn: Eesti Riiklik Kirjastus 1958. 143 S.
- (Lall Kahas) Vabaduskiri ('Freedom Letter'). Tallinn: Eesti Riiklik Kirjastus 1961. 328 S.
- Lauri ja Kairi kummaline matk ('Lauri and Kairi's Strange Journey'). Tallinn: Eesti Riiklik Kirjastus 1964. 148 S.
- Läki metsa! ('Into the Woods!'). Tallinn: Eesti Raamat 1966. 32 S.
- Kirjud lood ('Colorful Tales'). Tallinn: Eesti Raamat 1970. 176 S.
- Londiste, õige nimega Vant ('Londiste, Real Name Phant'). Tallinn: Eesti Raamat 1972. 171 S.
- Jass ('Jass'). Tallinn: Eesti Raamat 1975. 151 S.
- Pikk päev ('The Long Day'). Tallinn: Eesti Raamat 1975. 109 S.
- Aga palju kasse ('But Many Cats'). Tallinn: Eesti Raamat 1977. 32 S.
- Heinaritsik, kellele meeldis naljatada ('The Grasshopper who Liked to Have Fun'). Tallinn: Eesti Raamat 1977. 120 S.
- Tuline jäätis ('Hot Ice Cream'). Tallinn: Eesti Raamat 1978. 72 S.
- Piki ja Tohotiise (' Piki and Tohotiise '). Tallinn: Eesti Raamat 1980. 64 S.
- Kuidas kasvatada lastevanemaid. Päkapikk Ninatarga pajatused ('How to teach Parents'). Tallinn: Koolibri 1995. 143 S.
