= Kenneth W. Regan =

American professor, chess player, and statistician (born 1959)

Personal information
- Born: September 13, 1959 (age 66) Paramus, New Jersey

Chess career
- Country: United States
- Title: International Master (1981)
- Peak rating: 2435 (July 1982)

Kenneth Wingate Regan is an American professor, chess player, statistician, and computer scientist. He is an expert in anti-cheating in chess, and was involved in investigating known cheaters such as Sébastien Feller, Borislav Ivanov, and Igors Rausis.

== Biography ==
=== Chess ===
Regan began playing chess at the age of 5, and was able to defeat his father soon afterwards. At the age of 13, he became the youngest person to achieve the USCF Master title since Bobby Fischer, a record which has since been broken. He graduated from Paramus High School in 1977, where he played on the chess club. Regan was the co-champion of the 1977 U.S. Junior Chess Championship.

He commented during the Carlsen–Niemann controversy that his analysis of Niemann's classical games since 2020 found no evidence of cheating, though he still largely endorsed Chess.com's report which claimed that Niemann had cheated in numerous online games.

=== Academia ===
Regan is a professor in the Department of Computer Science and Engineering at the University at Buffalo.
