= Kate Murphy =

Kate Murphy may refer to:

- Kate A. Murphy (born 1985), co-founder and CEO of Play Magnus
- Kate Murphy (Body of Proof), a fictional character in Body of Proof

== See also ==
- Catherine Murphy (disambiguation)
- Katy Murphy (born 1962), Scottish actress and teacher
