= Carlsen–Niemann controversy =

2022 chess controversy

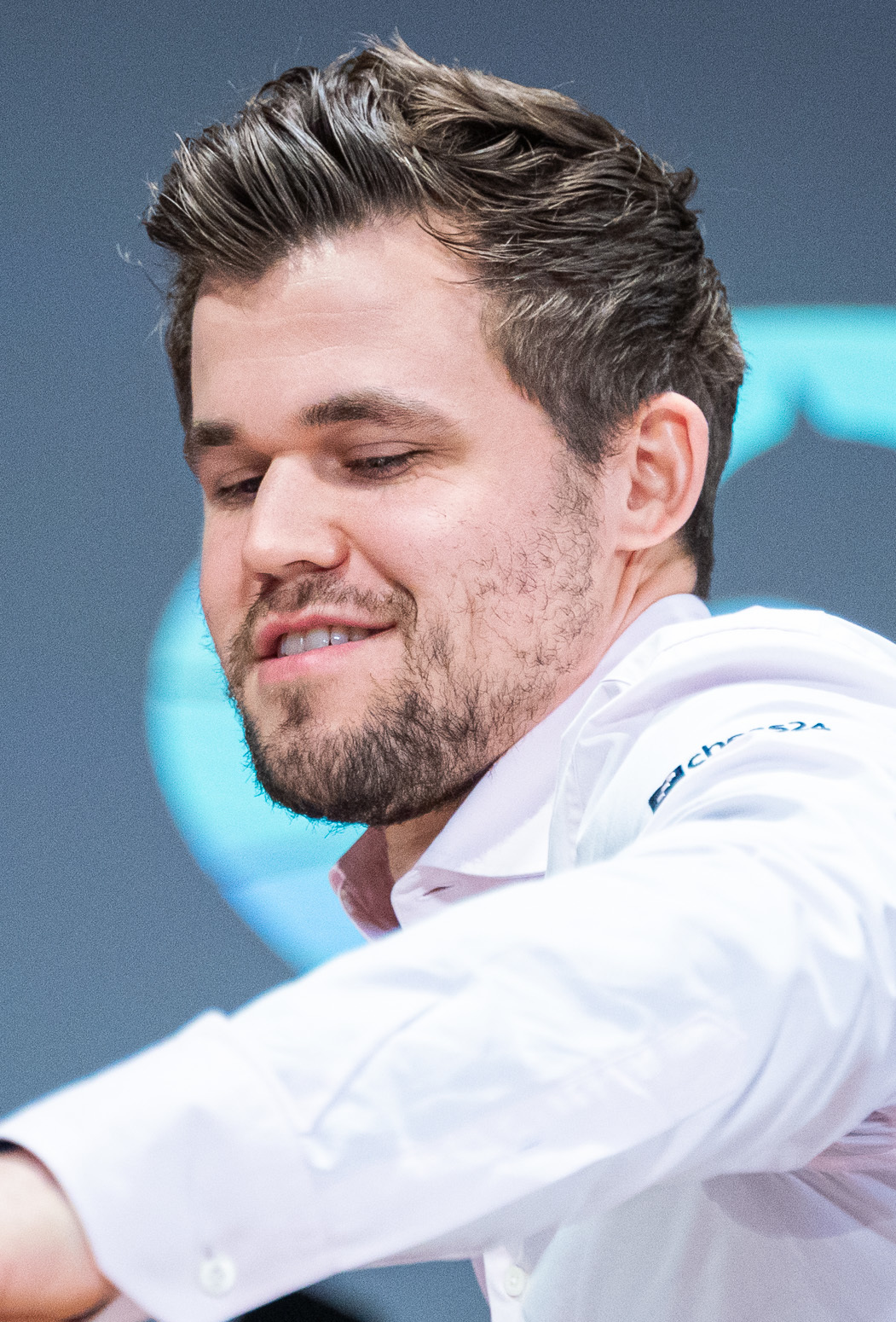
Magnus Carlsen

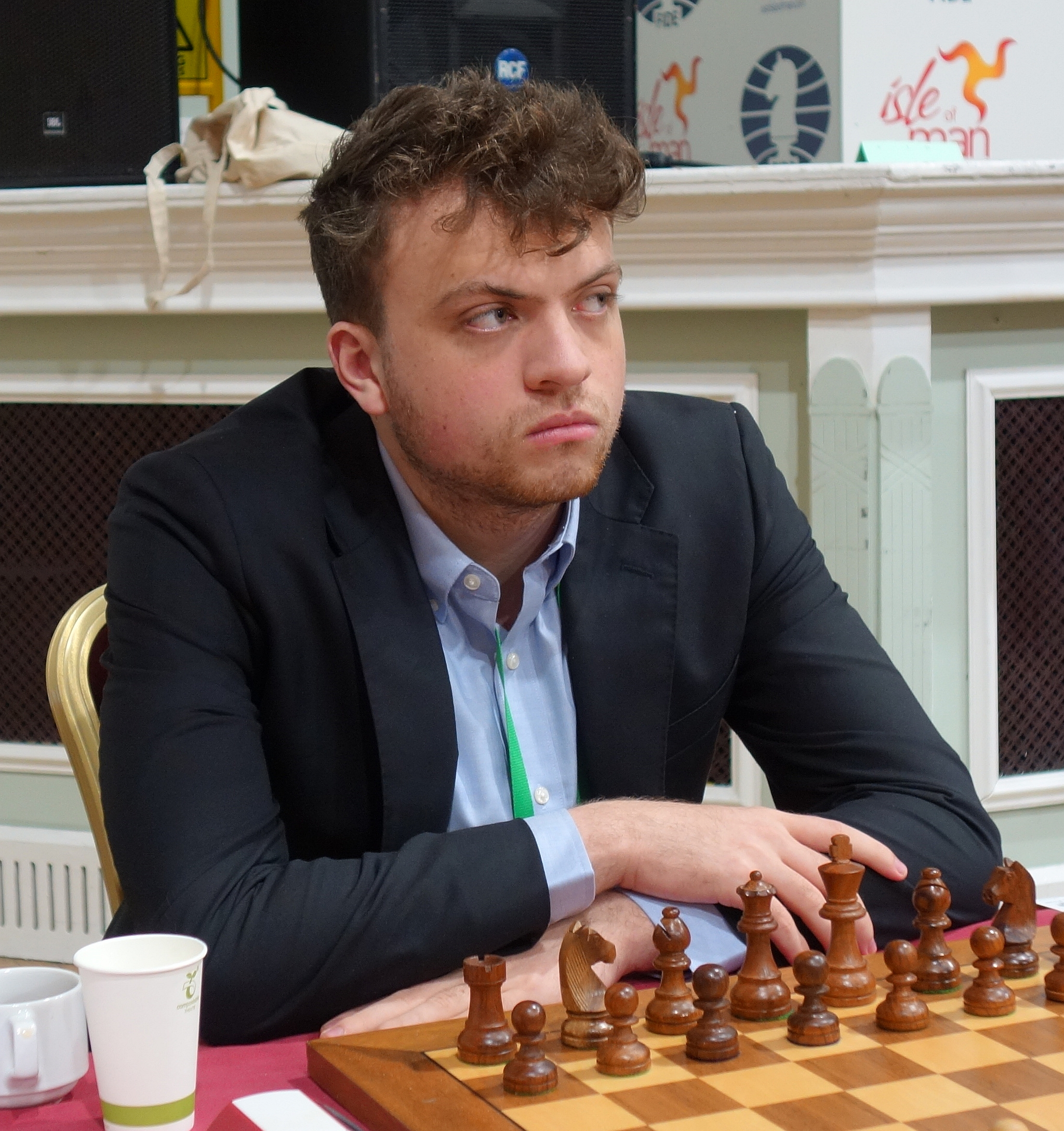
Hans Niemann

The two players involved in the controversy

During the Sinquefield Cup in September 2022, a controversy arose involving the chess grandmasters Magnus Carlsen, then world champion, and Hans Niemann. Carlsen, after being upset in their third-round matchup, dropped out of the tournament. Many commentators, most vocally grandmaster Hikaru Nakamura, interpreted his withdrawal as tacitly accusing Niemann of having cheated. In their next encounter in an online tournament, Carlsen abruptly resigned after one move, seemingly doubling down on his insinuation. The controversy became the most serious scandal about cheating allegations in chess in years, and it garnered significant attention in the news media worldwide.

After the fifth round of the Sinquefield Cup, Niemann gave a lengthy interview addressing the controversy, in which he admitted to cheating in online chess in the past, but denied cheating in the game with Carlsen or in any over-the-board game. Three weeks later, Carlsen released a statement saying that Niemann's behavior during their Sinquefield Cup game, taken together with earlier suspicions, had persuaded him to withdraw from the tournament. Carlsen expressed the belief that Niemann had cheated more often and more recently than he had publicly admitted.

Chess.com removed Niemann from their platform in the days after Carlsen's withdrawal from the Sinquefield Cup. FIDE, the international chess governing body, rebuked Carlsen for his actions but at the same time acknowledged his concerns about cheating in chess. FIDE later announced an investigation into Carlsen's claims of cheating and Niemann's response. Chess.com released an interim report summarizing their evaluation of Niemann's games and their estimation of his online cheating on their platform. Many chess players and journalists commented on the issue, some supporting Carlsen's suspicions in one way or another, others criticizing him for his tournament withdrawal and for making allegations without providing any evidence. Most top players expressed the view that Niemann had not cheated in the game against Carlsen, partly also criticizing Carlsen's play in the game. Most commentators expressed their desire for strict and consistent cheating controls in chess tournaments.

In October 2022, Niemann filed a lawsuit against Carlsen, his company Play Magnus Group, Chess.com, Chess.com's Chief Chess Officer Daniel Rensch, and Nakamura for defamation and unlawful collusion. The complaint claimed that statements in the Chess.com report had falsely accused Niemann of a more extensive history of cheating in the past than he had publicly admitted, and that those statements were part of a malicious conspiracy to defame Niemann. The antitrust claims in the lawsuit were dismissed in June 2023.

In August 2023, Chess.com announced that all parties involved in the lawsuit had settled; Chess.com reinstated Niemann on their platform and Carlsen admitted that there was no determinative evidence that Niemann had cheated in their Sinquefield Cup game. He promised to play against Niemann should they be paired. That December, FIDE fined Carlsen 10,000 euros for his withdrawal from the Sinquefield Cup, but acquitted him of all charges related to his unsubstantiated allegations against Niemann.

== Background ==
In 2022, Carlsen was the No. 1 rated player in history and World Chess Champion. In July 2022, Carlsen announced he would not defend his World Chess Championship title against Ian Nepomniachtchi, while affirming his desire to participate in tournaments and continue playing professional chess. At this time, Niemann stood in the top 10 of the world's juniors in chess and top 50 players overall. Over the previous three years, he had played a large number of games, and his Elo rating had risen swiftly, including a jump from 2500 to 2600 in only three months. This rapid rise had attracted attention from commentators.

In August 2022, Niemann and Carlsen both competed in the FTX Crypto Cup, an in-person rapid event hosted by Chess24 in Miami. On August 16, Niemann faced Carlsen in a four-game match, and beat him in the first game with the black pieces. After the game, when asked for a post-game interview, he said only "Chess speaks for itself." He proceeded to lose the subsequent three games against Carlsen.

On August 24, Chess.com announced that they would be acquiring Play Magnus Group in a $82 million dollar merger, stating it would take between six to eight weeks to finalize the deal. The acquisition process finished on December 16, 2022, with Carlsen also becoming a Chess.com ambassador.

In September, Carlsen participated as a wildcard in the 2022 Sinquefield Cup, an over-the-board tournament with classical time control and part of the Grand Chess Tour. Entering the tournament, he had a 53-game unbeaten streak in classical over-the-board games which determine the FIDE world rankings.

== Sinquefield Cup ==
On September 4, 2022, in the third round of the Sinquefield Cup, Niemann defeated Carlsen with the black pieces, playing the Nimzo-Indian Defense. His live rating surpassed 2700 for the first time with this win. Slate described the result as a "shocking upset" for Carlsen, ending his unbeaten streak to a player with a far lower rating, and in a game where he had the first-move advantage.

Position: e8 white rook, b7 black pawn, f7 black pawn, g7 black king, a6 black pawn, h6 black pawn, c5 black rook, f5 black pawn, a4 white pawn, c4 black knight, e4 black pawn, g4 white pawn, a2 white bishop, e2 white pawn, f2 white pawn, h2 white pawn, e1 white king

Position after 30.a4. It was put to Niemann that 30.a4 was an "important mistake", because 30.Bxc4 Rxc4 31.gxf5 would offer a "stronger defense". Niemann dismissed this possibility, arguing that after 31...Ra4, with b7–b5 to come, Black would soon have the advantage with the two connected passed pawns on the a- and b-files.

Location: St. Louis Missouri, U.S.
Date: September 4, 2022
White: Carlsen, Magnus
Black: Niemann, Hans
E20: Nimzo-Indian, Romanishin–Kasparov–Steiner system
Result: 0–1
Moves: 57

1.d4 Nf6 2.c4 e6 3.Nc3 Bb4 4.g3 0-0 5.Bg2 d5 6.a3 Bxc3+ 7.bxc3 dxc4 8.Nf3 c5 9.0-0 cxd4 10.Qxd4 Nc6 11.Qxc4 e5 12.Bg5 h6 13.Rfd1 Be6 14.Rxd8 Bxc4 15.Rxa8 Rxa8 16.Bxf6 gxf6 17.Kf1 Rd8 18.Ke1 Na5 19.Rd1 Rc8 20.Nd2 Be6 21.c4 Bxc4 22.Nxc4 Rxc4 23.Rd8+ Kg7 24.Bd5 Rc7 25.Ra8 a6 26.Rb8 f5 27.Re8 e4 28.g4 Rc5 29.Ba2 Nc4 30.a4 (see diagram) Nd6 31.Re7 fxg4 32.Rd7 e3 33.fxe3 Ne4 34.Kf1 Rc1+ 35.Kg2 Rc2 36.Bxf7 Rxe2+ 37.Kg1 Re1+ 38.Kg2 Re2+ 39.Kg1 Kf6 40.Bd5 Rd2 41.Rf7+ Kg6 42.Rd7 Ng5 43.Bf7+ Kf5 44.Rxd2 Nf3+ 45.Kg2 Nxd2 46.a5 Ke5 47.Kg3 Nf1+ 48.Kf2 Nxh2 49.e4 Kxe4 50.Be6 Kf4 51.Bc8 Nf3 52.Bxb7 Ne5 53.Bxa6 Nc6 54.Bb7 Nxa5 55.Bd5 h5 56.Bf7 h4 57.Bd5 Ke5 0–1

=== Carlsen's withdrawal ===
An Intelligencer article claimed that Carlsen got up towards the end of the game and accused the photographer Lennart Ootes of aiding Niemann, saying that there was a "massive tell". The managing director of the U.S. Chess Trust Al Lawrence witnessed this incident, stating "You might as well accuse the tournament director of cheating". Carlsen denied that this occurred, stating that he had just pointed out that people with knowledge of the engine evaluations can give players "tells" when they enter the room or go up to the board.

After the game, Carlsen expressed to the chief arbiter Chris Bird that he was going to withdraw from the tournament as he believed that Niemann had cheated against him in their game. Carlsen's father Henrik, Carlsen's second Peter Heine-Nielsen, Ian Nepomniachtchi and Peter Svidler were present at this meeting. Nepomniachtchi had previously expressed concerns about Niemann before the start of the event. Carlsen and Nepomniachtchi were informed that they could lodge a fair play violation complaint against Niemann. No complaint was filed by either Carlsen or Nepomniachtchi.

Niemann stated that Carlsen told the Executive Director of the Grand Chess Tour Michael Khodarkovsky that Niemann had cheated against him in their game and that Niemann be disqualified. Niemann also stated that after Khodarkovsky declined to expel him from the tournament, that Carlsen convinced Khodarkovsky to "dramatically enhance the anti-cheating measures at the Sinquefield Cup", by "adding military-grade metal detection scans and a 15-minute tape delay on all broadcasts of tournament games". Niemann stated that this was motivated by Carlsen's desire to induce the public to believe that a participant at the tournament had cheated.

Carlsen withdrew from the tournament the following day, tweeting a simple announcement of his withdrawal alongside a video of José Mourinho saying "I prefer really not to speak. If I speak, I am in big trouble." Carlsen's withdrawal did not formally allege that Niemann had cheated, but the broader community saw his tweet as heavily insinuating an accusation.

This was the first time in Carlsen's career that he had withdrawn from a major event in progress, and the incident was considered "virtually unprecedented" in top-level chess. As he had not played half of his matches in the event, the results from his first three games were annulled from the tournament, disrupting the early standings. Former world champion Garry Kasparov said that Carlsen's withdrawal from the tournament had "no precedent in the past 50 years", and called on Carlsen, who had refrained from comment, to explain his decision. Rampant speculation about the reasoning behind Carlsen's withdrawal on social media fueled the growing controversy. Another former world champion, Anatoly Karpov, added "Carlsen surprisingly played the opening so badly with white that he automatically got into a worse position. Then he showed a strange inability to cope with the difficult situation that had arisen on the board. Comments that White lost without chances are complete nonsense."

== Julius Baer Generation Cup ==
Position: a8 black rook, b8 black knight, c8 black bishop, d8 black queen, e8 black king, f8 black bishop, h8 black rook, a7 black pawn, b7 black pawn, c7 black pawn, d7 black pawn, e7 black pawn, f7 black pawn, g7 black pawn, h7 black pawn, f6 black knight, c4 white pawn, d4 white pawn, a2 white pawn, b2 white pawn, e2 white pawn, f2 white pawn, g2 white pawn, h2 white pawn, a1 white rook, b1 white knight, c1 white bishop, d1 white queen, e1 white king, f1 white bishop, g1 white knight, h1 white rook

Final position of the September 19 game

On September 19, 2022, Carlsen was again scheduled to play Niemann in the Julius Baer Generation Cup, an online tournament hosted by chess24 that was part of the Champions Chess Tour. He began the match, made one move against Niemann, then resigned and switched off his webcam.

The resignation prompted confusion and surprise from commentators Tania Sachdev and Péter Lékó. Grandmaster Maurice Ashley tweeted: "This is shocking and disturbing. No one can be happy that this is happening in the chess world. Unbelievable!"

Grandmaster Maxim Dlugy stated that lawyer Richard Conn gave a him a call, asking him about his relationship with Niemann. Dlugy stated that Richard Conn knew Carlsen. Dlugy replied that he "wasn't his [Niemann's] coach, more like his mentor". Dlugy also told Conn to tell Carlsen's team that he thought Carlsen's accusations were "absurd". Dlugy stated that this call was a "set up", designed to try to find an accomplice.

On September 21, after the end of the preliminary rounds of the tournament, Carlsen answered a question from chess24's broadcast of why he forfeited: "Unfortunately, I cannot particularly speak on that, but people can draw their own conclusions, and they certainly have. I have to say I'm very impressed by Niemann's play and I think his mentor Maxim Dlugy must be doing a great job." Carlsen's mention of Dlugy brought to light past accusations against Dlugy of cheating on Chess.com.

On September 25, Carlsen won the tournament after defeating Arjun Erigaisi in the second final match. In his last tournament interview, Carlsen said he would provide a statement on the controversy within days. He added that he "generally [wants] cheating in chess to be dealt with seriously", and it would not be the last time he would address the topic. In a follow-up interview with TV 2's chess broadcast, Carlsen said he would "probably" post a statement on social media and that there were limits on what he could say. He did not state if those limits were for legal reasons. Carlsen stated that he wanted more focus on "fair play" in chess:

It has always been a code of honor in the game at the top level that you trust each other. You know it is possible to cheat and probably not get caught, but it is so totally devastating to be caught, so then you trust that the incentives are not big enough for the best to cheat. It may feel like the time is ripe to change that point of view.

On September 28, Chess.com provided Vice with internal communications between their staff and Dlugy, revealing that Dlugy had been banned from Chess.com in 2017 and 2020 for cheating in their online tournaments. Dlugy had confessed to repeatedly crowdsourcing moves from his chess academy and using an "outside source". In a statement to Vice, Dlugy criticized Carlsen for implying he was involved in the ongoing controversy, and asserted he would consider legal action against him. Dlugy later posted a statement on his involvement in the controversy, and said he believed lawsuits would follow.

== Cheating allegations against Niemann ==
Grandmaster and streamer Hikaru Nakamura said he believed Carlsen had likely suspected Niemann of cheating, claiming that Niemann had previously been banned from Chess.com for cheating in online chess games. Levon Aronian, a grandmaster who was playing in the Sinquefield Cup, initially defended Niemann, stating that most high-level players are "pretty much paranoid" and that young players often draw accusations of cheating after strong play. A week later, Aronian stated that he "really didn't know much about a lot of things" and now finds himself "somewhere in the middle". He added, "I do believe Hans has not been the cleanest person when it comes to online chess." According to an anonymous source cited by the Wall Street Journal, Niemann's poor performance in Miami in August 2022, both at the eight-person FTX Crypto Cup (where Niemann had some strong games but lost every series) and in an informal beachside game against Carlsen, played a role in Carlsen's suspicions. Nakamura agreed that Miami seemed to play a role in Carlsen's thinking, stating that "When you combine (the poor Miami performances) with the long-existing rumors, Carlsen became convinced something was off."

=== Niemann's denial ===
In an interview on September 6, 2022, Niemann denied having cheated during the Sinquefield Cup and accused Carlsen, Nakamura, and Chess.com of attempting to ruin his career. He admitted that he had previously cheated in "multiple games" on Chess.com; first, when he was 12 years old during an online tournament and again when he was 16 years old in unrated online games. He maintained that he had never cheated in an over-the-board game. In response to unsubstantiated speculation alleging the involvement of a concealed device during the Sinquefield Cup, he offered to play in a closed environment without electronic connections and said "if they want me to strip fully naked, I will do it", to disprove any allegations of cheating. PlayMagnus.com published an article in response with the list of "The Biggest Cheating Scandals in Chess" with an accompanying meme with the text, "How did you beat Magnus Carlsen? Chess speaks for itself. What did it cost you? Everything." The meme was subsequently deleted from their social media accounts.

=== Carlsen's response ===
On September 26, Carlsen posted his official statement regarding the controversy on Twitter. He confirmed that he had considered withdrawing from the Sinquefield Cup due to Niemann's last-minute inclusion. Carlsen stated that he believed that Niemann cheated more often and more recently than he had publicly admitted, and that Niemann's unusual over the board progress coupled with him "not being tense or even fully concentrating" during their Sinquefield Cup game had convinced him to withdraw from the tournament. He stated that he was limited in what he could say openly without "explicit permission from Niemann" but went on to say that he does not want to play against people who have repeatedly cheated in the past, and that his actions make it clear that he is not willing to play chess with Niemann.

== Public responses ==
The controversy has been described as the most serious cheating scandal for international chess since the Toiletgate incident in the World Chess Championship 2006, and became a top story in the news media worldwide. It has garnered significant attention from outside of the chess community, including on American late-night talk shows The Daily Show with Trevor Noah and The Late Show with Stephen Colbert.

In April 2026, Netflix released a documentary on the topic, Untold: Chess Mates.

=== Chess organizers ===
The executive director of the Saint Louis Chess Club (host of the Sinquefield Cup), Tony Rich, said in a statement that "a player's decision to withdraw from a tournament is a personal decision, and we respect Magnus's choice." Rich later elaborated that no formal complaint was made in writing. Later in the tournament, Chief Arbiter Chris Bird published a statement affirming that there was "no indication that any player has been playing unfairly" during the Sinquefield Cup. Bird's statement did not address the reason to add additional security measures after Carlsen's withdrawal. Even so, the organisers increased measures of metal detection on the players and introduced a 15-minute broadcast delay for the next rounds of the tournament.

The SLCC organizers permanently upgraded their anti-cheating measures for future events, including nonlinear junction detectors to detect silicon in electronics, and a 30-minute broadcast delay for the duration of the U.S. Chess Championships.

FIDE upgraded their anti-cheating measures for the FIDE World Fischer Random Chess Championship 2022. This included a medical doctor to inspect the ears of players for any transmitters, and confiscating the electronics of spectators.

=== Players and commentators ===
Two days after the game, French grandmaster Maxime Vachier-Lagrave, a participant in the 2022 Sinquefield Cup and the reigning World Blitz Champion, expressed concern that the developing drama was becoming a "witch hunt". He did not think that Niemann had cheated. Laurent Fressinet, second of Carlsen in all his World Chess Championship matches, revealed "Few months ago, I met Hans in Paris, MVL was playing a blitz match with him, it was very close and MVL won in armageddon. Then, he played with Jules Moussard, I can tell you he would kick our arse in blitz without any problems that's for sure."

After the event, Ian Nepomniachtchi commented that he had asked the St. Louis organizers for additional anti-cheating measures once he heard Niemann would be playing in the event. Fabiano Caruana mentioned that Carlsen was already "upset" about Niemann's inclusion and had considered leaving before the tournament began. This was later confirmed by Carlsen in a statement released September 26. Christopher Yoo called for more accountability for Niemann's past actions.

Many members of the chess community expressed their views after Carlsen released his statement. Some who expressed their support for Carlsen were Nakamura, Romain Édouard, R. B. Ramesh, Srinath Narayanan, and Andrew Tang, who praised him for taking a principled stance and forcing a public discussion on cheating in chess.

Others were more critical of Carlsen's handling of the matter. Maurice Ashley, Daniel King, and Ben Finegold questioned his need for Niemann's permission if he did have evidence, and criticized him for dropping insinuations without providing any evidence. Raymond Keene stated that Niemann could seek legal counsel, citing Nona Gaprindashvili's Netflix defamation case. Sergey Karjakin criticized current anti-cheat measures but maintained that no proof so far had been established against Niemann. Garry Kasparov said he understood Carlsen's "frustration", but that leaving the Sinquefield Cup was unacceptable without any evidence of Niemann cheating. Dutch chess commentator Tim Krabbé published a satirical comment "Carlsen caught at cheating", foiling Carlsen's statement "I had the impression that he wasn't tense or even fully concentrating on the game" with a photo of Carlsen in a nap-like relaxing pose at the board.

Viswanathan Anand, speaking about the controversy, said that the moves of the game did not suggest to him that Niemann was cheating, that he keeps an open mind, that he does not make claims he cannot prove, and that proof of cheating will be difficult if not impossible to produce. He asked, "I don't know, am I naïve, or are my colleagues paranoid?"

Many called on FIDE to investigate the controversy. Nakamura and Daniel Naroditsky commented that there should be clear agreements among online platforms and FIDE on the subject of cheating. Leonard Barden, The Guardian's chess columnist, asked FIDE to act. Nigel Davies criticized Carlsen for not releasing evidence, and called for the FIDE Ethics Commission to step in.

=== Chess.com ===
In Niemann's September 6, 2022, interview, he claimed that Chess.com had suspended him again from the site and their events in light of the controversy. Chess.com's chief chess officer Daniel Rensch, in a statement on Twitter, disputed Niemann's assertions and affirmed that Niemann would remain suspended pending an explanation of his past online cheating. In Reddit posts, Chess.com CEO Erik Allebest hinted that more information might be released.

On September 25, Rensch addressed rumors that the platform had shared their internal research, including a list of cheaters, with Carlsen prior to his withdrawal. Chess.com was in the process of acquiring the company Play Magnus Group, which Carlsen founded, and its subsidiary chess24. Rensch stated that Carlsen was not given such a list, nor any inside information about Chess.com's cheating detection algorithms.

== Investigations ==
=== Chess.com report ===
On September 29, 2022, Allebest stated on Reddit that Chess.com was investigating Niemann's cheating with a "complete timeline" and all of the "facts and reasons" for their decisions. On October 1, Rensch announced that Chess.com would publish their findings in the following week.

On October 4, The Wall Street Journal obtained Chess.com's report, which Chess.com published on the same day. The 72-page report gave details of the site's assessment of Niemann's cheating on their platform. It alleged that Niemann had likely cheated in more than 100 online games, including prize money events and games when he was live-streaming, and against multiple top players, including Daniel Naroditsky, Krikor Mekhitarian, David Paravyan, Ian Nepomniachtchi, and Benjamin Bok. The report concluded that he had likely cheated online as recently as August 2020, shortly after he turned 17, contradicting his statement during his Sinquefield Cup interview that he had cheated when he was 12 and 16. The report stated that Niemann had privately confessed to cheating to Rensch, and was banned from the platform for a time. It also indicated that Niemann might have been toggling to a different screen during some games.

The report dedicated a few pages to Niemann's over-the-board performance, stating that "in our view, there is a lack of concrete statistical evidence that he cheated in his game with Magnus or any other over-the-board ('OTB')—i.e., in-person—games." But it labeled several of Niemann's events as meriting "further investigation based on the data". The report mentioned as peculiar but drew no conclusions from the statement made by Niemann in his post-game interview that it was inexplicable and a "ridiculous miracle" that he had the very day of the game, before the game, used a computer engine to analyze an unusual position that arose in his game against Carlsen. Niemann had earlier clarified that he had analyzed a variation of the Nimzo-Indian Defense with g3, and spent extra time during the game making sure the indirect transposition would arise correctly from a different move order on the eighth move of the game. The report emphasized Carlsen's surprise at losing his OTB game to Niemann, and that Carlsen had no conversations with Chess.com regarding their anti-cheating policies.

The report also noted that their cheat-detection system had identified many other GMs as cheating, including a redacted list of 24 such GMs and their ratings at the time. On October 15, Chess.com released a "community update" addressing questions raised by their interim report and confirmed that they do not have any plans to release names of other top players whom they suspect of cheating.

=== FIDE ===
Ken Regan, an associate professor at the University at Buffalo, developed FIDE's anti-cheating system. Regan's statistical analysis of Niemann's games since 2020, including the Sinquefield Cup game between Carlsen and Niemann at the request of Sinquefield Cup organisers, saw no evidence of cheating. On the other hand, Regan was later quoted in Time magazine as expressing frustration that Niemann's eventual lawsuit had "overstretched" Regan's statements to suggest that Regan disagreed with the Chess.com report about Niemann's history of cheating, which Regan in fact largely endorsed. Regan also criticized Chess.com's claim that Niemann was "the fastest-rising top player in Classical OTB chess in modern history", stating that this was "just wrong".

Emil Sutovsky, the Director General of FIDE, the international chess federation, noted that Carlsen had not previously quit any tournament and thus opined that Carlsen must believe he has "a compelling reason" to do so. He emphasised the need to follow anti-cheating procedures.

On September 23, 2022, FIDE President Arkady Dvorkovich released a statement on behalf of FIDE. Dvorkovich criticized Carlsen for his actions and mentioned the "moral responsibility attached to his status", claiming that "there were better ways to handle this situation." Dvorkovich stated that FIDE has "invested in forming a group of specialists to devise sophisticated preventive measures [against cheating] that already apply at top FIDE events" and that FIDE calls for "reinforcing the cooperation between major online platforms, private events and top players". Dvorkovich announced that FIDE would task its Fair Play commission to investigate the incident "when the adequate initial proof is provided".

On September 29, FIDE announced in a statement that they had officially launched an investigation into the controversy. FIDE's Fair Play Commission (FPL) formed a panel out of three of its twelve members with the possibility to consult with external expert analysis. Klaus Deventer, an FPL member, stated that the investigation would examine whether there were enough facts to justify an allegation of cheating against Niemann, and whether Carlsen made a false accusation. Deventer added that the FIDE Ethics and Disciplinary Committee could issue sanctions to either player, including game bans. FIDE's required standard of proof to sanction a player for cheating exceeds 99%.

On October 13, 2022, Carlsen replied to the Investigating Panel (IP) of the FPL. Carlsen stated "In my statement I did not accuse Niemann of cheating in the game against me in the Sinquefield Cup, as I was only expressing my personal impression of the game." Carlsen stated that he did not make an accusation regarding Niemann's over the board games. Carlsen also gave his perspective on his game against Niemann at Sinquefield, stating that Niemann did not appear to be nervous and that he did not appear to be exerting himself or thinking. He claimed that Niemann ignored an obvious way to win, choosing a much more complicated line and that Niemann referenced a nonexistent game in his post-game analysis, while also providing a nonsensical explanation of how he exploited Carlsen's rare opening line.

Carlsen claimed the IP's investigation was incomplete as they did not have all the facts as he was constrained by the lawsuit filed against him by Niemann. He accused the IP of cherrypicking interviewees regarding the Sinquefield Cup. Carlsen claimed that the IP was biased as he had conflicts with two of its members in the past, and criticized the IP for not reviewing Niemann's tournaments beyond a three year period. Carlsen also expressed doubt about Ken Regan's ability to detect cheating. The EDC Chamber declared that the IP report was admissable as incompleteness "merely affects the weight of its reliance by the EDC Chamber and the persuasiveness of the Report." The EDC also expressed "its disappointment with the lack of evidence" provided by Carlsen after the settlement of the lawsuit.

On December 12, 2023, FIDE issued their decision on the controversy. Carlsen was found not guilty on three charges of "reckless or manifestly unfounded accusation of chess cheating", "attempt to undermine honour", and "disparagement of FIDE's reputation and interest". Carlsen was found guilty of "withdrawal from tournaments" for his sudden withdrawal from the 2022 Sinquefield Cup after his loss to Niemann. FIDE fined Carlsen 10,000 euros for the guilty finding.

== Legal action ==
On October 20, 2022, Niemann filed a federal lawsuit in the U.S. District Court for the Eastern District of Missouri against Carlsen, his company Play Magnus Group, Chess.com, Rensch, and Nakamura. In his suit, Niemann's lawyers claimed he had been subject to defamation and unlawful collusion, and requested at least $100 million in damages, citing his disinvitation from the Chess.com Global Championship on September 5 after qualifying for it through winning the required tournaments as well as having received an email from Chess.com on August 31 saying it was "super excited to have [Niemann] in the event, and looking forward to [him] competing." Tata Steel Chess Tournament ceased its ongoing arrangements for Niemann to play in its January 2023 event, and Vincent Keymer canceled an upcoming match with him in Germany.

Chess.com and Play Magnus Group called Niemann's allegations meritless. Carlsen's lawyer called Niemann's allegations "nothing more than an attempt to deflect blame onto others." Chess.com's lawyer, Nima Mohebbi, similarly stated "[t]here is no merit to Hans' allegations, and Chess.com looks forward to setting the record straight on behalf of its team and all honest chess players." On December 2, 2022, lawyers for both Carlsen and Chess.com filed a motion to dismiss Niemann's lawsuit with the Eastern Missouri District Court, stating that Niemann's suit was a "public relations stunt". A week later Nakamura also moved to dismiss the lawsuit. On June 27, 2023, Niemann's case was dismissed by a federal judge.

=== Settlement ===
On August 28, 2023, Chess.com announced that all parties involved in the legal dispute had reached an agreement over the matter and there would be no further litigation. The agreement means Niemann will again be able to play on the Chess.com platform.

In a statement, Carlsen said he acknowledged and understood the Chess.com report made "no determinative evidence that Niemann cheated in his game against me at the Sinquefield Cup." He said he is willing to play Niemann in future events should they be paired. Niemann said he was pleased the lawsuit had been resolved and that he could return to Chess.com. He said he looked forward to "competing against Magnus in chess rather than in court." Nakamura, who had been named as a defendant in the dismissed lawsuit, said he was glad the chess world had "moved forward", adding that "a lot of things that were spawned out of this were very negative and definitely reflected very poorly on chess as a whole."

=== Aftermath ===
In 2024, Carlsen and Niemann played three online games against each other during the span of several Titled Tuesday events on Chess.com. Carlsen scored 2½/3 in those games. In the 2024 FIDE World Rapid and Blitz Team Championships, Carlsen's team WR Chess was paired four times in total against the team GMHans.com. Despite his statement in the settlement, Carlsen sat out all four matches and avoided an over-the-board encounter with Niemann on board 1.

Carlsen and Niemann next played again in the Speed Chess Championship on September 6, 2024, in Paris. Though the match was held in person, the games were played on a computer over Chess.com. The match consisted of three sections with different time controls. Carlsen won the 5+1 portion 7–2, while the remaining sections were tied at 4–4 and 6½–6½, thus giving Carlsen the win 17½–12½. Carlsen then proceeded to the final against Alireza Firouzja, which he won with a dominant 23½–7½ score. Niemann was later beaten 9–21 in the third-place match against Nakamura.

Former world champion Vladimir Kramnik, who had initially voiced public skepticism about Niemann's integrity, later entered into direct contact with him. Following a private exchange and a meeting in Geneva, Kramnik became Niemann’s coach, mentor, and friend. Their collaboration has been confirmed by both players in multiple interviews.

American independent entertainment company A24 was reported to be planning to make a movie about the controversy, directed by Emma Stone and Nathan Fielder. The planned production is based on American author Ben Mezrich's book proposal.

In 2025, Carlsen stated in an interview on the The Joe Rogan Experience podcast "I think ever since then, he [Niemann] has become better, but there's still something off, both then and now".

The Netflix documentary Untold: Chess Mates was released in April 2026, featuring interviews with Carlsen and Niemann about the controversy. In the documentary, Carlsen stated that he felt like he had been "gaslit" by Rensch and Chess.com "into thinking that they had the evidence [of Niemann cheating over-the-board] which they didn't."

Carlsen's father, Henrik, said that Chess.com was "so concerned about the relationship to Magnus, they may have promised a little more than they could deliver". Rensch and Chess.com CEO Erik Allebest stated that Henrik and Magnus had asked them to investigate Niemann's games.

Ben Mezrich wrote a book, published in June 2026 by Grand Central Publishing, about the situation. Entitled Checkmate: Genius, Lies, Ambition, and the Biggest Scandal in Chess (ISBN 978-1-5387-7305-5), it is the first account of the situation in book form.
