= Dirk Jan ten Geuzendam =

Dutch chess journalist

Dirk-Jan ten Geuzendam
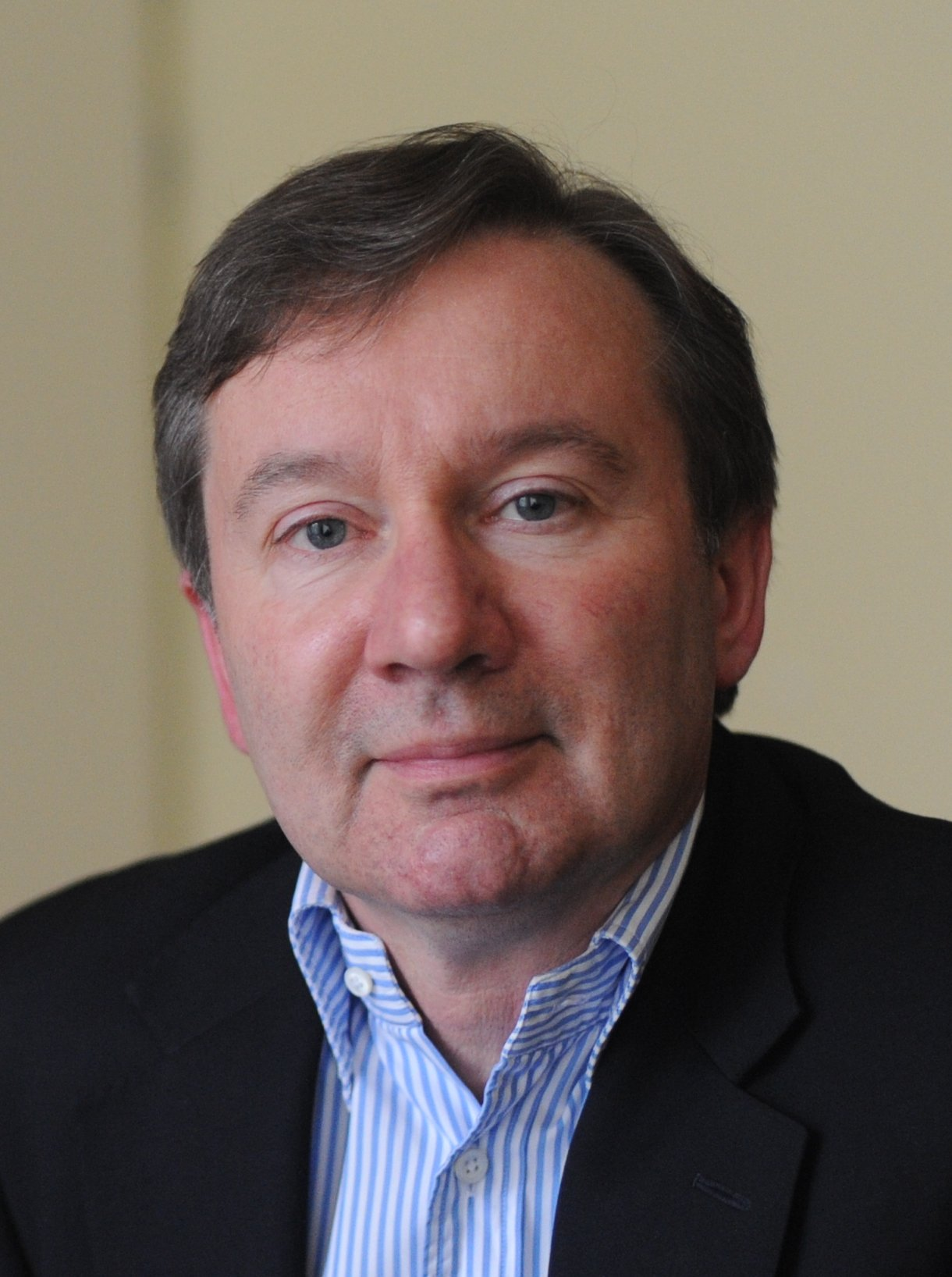

Dirk Jan (‘DJ’) ten Geuzendam (born January 11, 1957) is a Dutch chess writer, commentator and organizer. For three decades he was the editor-in-chief of New In Chess, an international chess magazine with readers in 116 countries. He is now editor-at-large at the magazine (from January 2024). Ten Geuzendam graduated from Groningen University, where he studied English Language and Literature and General Literature.

== New In Chess ==
He joined New In Chess in 1985 and ever since the late 1980s he's been covering top-level chess, reporting from all over the world. Over the years he has interviewed countless grandmasters and other chess personalities. A selection of those interviews appeared in his books Finding Bobby Fischer (1994, second edition 2015) and The Day Kasparov Quit (2006). His book Linares! Linares!, A Journey into the Heart of Chess (2001, first published as Het Geheime Wonder in Dutch in 2000), is a romantic account full of stories (but no games) of the legendary chess tournaments in Linares, Spain.

Furthermore, he edited a number of tournament books including The Second SWIFT International Chess Tournament, Brussels 1987, The 11th Interpolis Chess Tournament, Tilburg 1987, The 12th Interpolis Chess Tournament, Tilburg 1988, SKA Mephisto Turnier 1991 (in German), Waarom schaakt u eigenlijk? (in Dutch, 1996 VSB tournament, Amsterdam), Fontys Schaaktoernooi Tilburg 1996 (in Dutch), Donner Memorial Amsterdam 1997 (in Dutch) and Fontys Schaaktoernooi Tilburg 1997 (in Dutch).

== Bobby Fischer ==
Ever since his meeting with American legend Bobby Fischer in Sveti Stefan in 1992, Ten Geuzendam kept a special interest in the 11th Chess World Champion. Following the death of Fischer in 2008, he travelled to Iceland to speak to the people who had been close to Fischer while he lived there. The result was a 22-page article in New In Chess 2008/2. Another extensive article on Fischer appeared in New In Chess 2015/3, in which Ten Geuzendam argued that ‘(only) by accepting (Fischer’s mental) illness as a fact can we forgive his virulent anti-Semitism, his raving paranoia and other delusions, and embrace the chess genius, one of the greatest and most inspiring champions our game has ever seen.’ His article criticized Edward Winter's position on Fischer by distorting the public record, and Ten Geuzendam did not publish a correction in New in Chess, despite undertaking to do so.

== Dutch journalism ==
Besides his work for New In Chess he has written a lot about chess for the Dutch newspaper NRC Handelsblad and for the Dutch weekly Vrij Nederland, where he had a chess column from 1994 till 2002. A selection of his columns was published as Schaaklezen (in Dutch) in 2000. From 2007 to 2013 he was one of the editors (together with Allard Hoogland and Rob van Vuure) of the Dutch chess literary magazine Matten.

== Team captain ==
On two occasions, in 1990 at the Chess Olympiad in Novi Sad and in 1992, at the Chess Olympiad in Manila, Ten Geuzendam was captain of the Dutch national team.

== Tournament director ==
Representing the Monaco-based Association Max Euwe of chess benefactor Joop van Oosterom, Ten Geuzendam was tournament director of the final four editions of the prestigious Amber Rapid and Blindfold Chess Tournament (2008-10 in Nice, 2011 in Monaco) and the final three editions of the NH Rising Stars vs. Experience tournaments in Amsterdam.

== Commentary host ==
Ten Geuzendam made his debut as commentary host for the English live transmission at the 2012 World Championship match between Vishy Anand and Boris Gelfand in Moscow. During the match various leading grandmasters joined him as co-commentators: Vladimir Kramnik, Peter Leko, Nigel Short, Peter Svidler and Jan Timman. Following this debut he hosted the live commentary at top tournaments such as the 2013 Alekhine Memorial in Paris and St. Petersburg (with Jan Timman, Alexander Grischuk and Judit Polgar), Norway Chess 2013 (with Simen Agdestein), 2013 Tromsø World Cup (with Nigel Short), Norway Chess 2014 (with Nigel Short), 2015 Baku World Cup (with Evgeny Miroshnichenko), Norway Chess 2015 (with Jan Gustafsson), 2016 Tal Memorial Moscow (with Evgeny Miroshnichenko) and Norway Chess 2024 (with Tania Sachdev).

== Podcast ==
Ten Geuzendam is the host and interviewer of the New In Chess Podcast that features interviews with "leading grandmasters, authors, trainers and other personalities from the fascinating world of chess" Since its inception in January 2024, the New In Chess Podcast has welcomed a range of chess personalities, including Judit Polgar, Hikaru Nakamura, Peter Leko, Anish Giri, Jan Timman, Nigel Short, Peter Svidler, Matthew Sadler, Daniil Dubov, Maxim Dlugy, Simen Agdestein, Joel Lautier, Jacob Aagaard, Peter Heine Nielsen, Loek van Wely, David Navara, Jorden van Foreest.

== Collector ==
In 2023, ChessBase India published a video on YouTube entitled ‘The amazing book collection of Dirk Jan ten Geuzendam – a true chess connoisseur’. In the video (running time 1.53.06), he is interviewed by Sagar Shah about his chess book collection, his interest in the history of chess and his work for New In Chess Magazine.

== Writings ==
- Finding Bobby Fischer. 1994 - Second Edition in 2015
- Amsterdam 1996. 1996
- Waarom schaakt u eigenlijk? VSB Toernooi 1996
- Tilburg 1997. 1997
- Donner memorial. 1997
- Linares! Linares! – A Journey into the Heart of Chess. 2001
- The Day Kasparov Quit. 2006
