= Igors Rausis =

Latvian chess player (1961–2024)

Igors Rausis (Isa Kasimi)
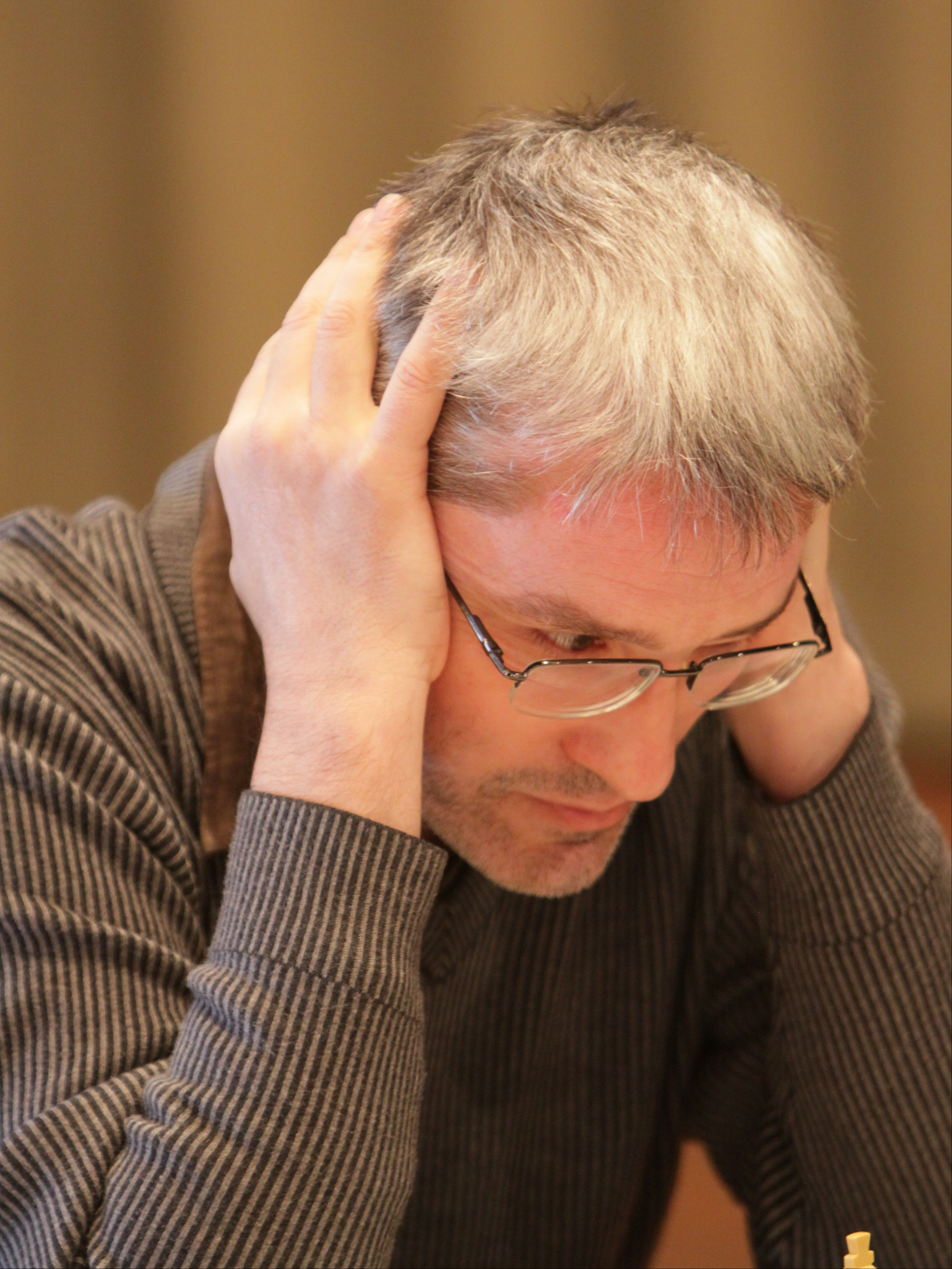
- Rausis at the 2011 Winterthurer Schachwoche tournament

Personal information
- Born: Igor Kondylev; April 7, 1961 Komunarsk, Luhansk Oblast, Ukrainian SSR, USSR
- Died: March 28, 2024 (aged 62)
- Spouses: Olita Rause; Ajgul Kasimova

Chess career
- Country: Soviet Union (until 1991); Latvia (1992–2002); Bangladesh (2003–2007); Czech Republic (2007–2020); FIDE (2020–2024)
- Title: Grandmaster (1992, revoked in 2019); International Master
- Peak rating: 2686 (July 2019)
- Peak ranking: No. 46 (April 2020)

Isa Kasimi (April 7, 1961 – March 28, 2024), born Igor Kondylev and known as Igors Rausis until 2020, was a Latvian chess International Master. He was awarded the title of Grandmaster by FIDE in 1992, but the title was revoked after he was caught cheating in 2019. He won the Latvian Chess Championship in 1995. He represented Bangladesh from 2003 to 2007, when he switched to the Czech Republic.

In July 2019, Kasimi was caught cheating in a Strasbourg tournament, after which he admitted to the transgression and announced his immediate retirement from chess. The Czech Chess Federation subsequently cancelled his membership, and the FIDE Ethics Commission stripped him of his Grandmaster title and gave him a six-year ban. At the time, he was the oldest player ranked among FIDE's top 100 players. Kasimi is featured as a key character in the Juhani Seppovaara novel Shakkimestari ("A Chess Master", 2024).

== Chess career ==
Rausis won the Latvian Chess Championship in 1995. He played for team Latvia in three Chess Olympiads:

- In 1996, at the second board in the 32nd Chess Olympiad in Yerevan (+2−2=8);
- In 1998, at the third board in the 33rd Chess Olympiad in Elista (+2−2=8);
- In 2002, at the second board in the 35th Chess Olympiad in Bled (+1−1=1).

Rausis represented Latvia at the 1993 World Team Chess Championship in Lucerne, at the first reserve board (+0−2=2).

Rausis was also active as a trainer; he coached the Latvian women's team at the 1994 Olympiad, the Bangladeshi team at the 2000, 2002, 2008 and 2018 Olympiads, the Algerian team at the 2010 Olympiad, and the team of Jersey at the 2012 and 2014 Olympiads. In 2018, he was awarded the title of FIDE Trainer.

In July 2019, Rausis was caught cheating in the Strasbourg Open, using a mobile phone in the toilet. He admitted to having cheated, and announced his retirement from chess. Prior to the incident, Rausis had been under suspicion for several months; FIDE's Fair Play Commission Secretary, Yuri Garrett, stated in a Facebook post that the Commission "has been closely following [Rausis] for months" on the basis of Ken Regan's statistical insights. On December 5, 2019, the FIDE Ethics Commission banned Rausis from all FIDE-rated chess tournaments for 6 years and formally revoked his Grandmaster title, without, however, affecting his other titles or his rating.

In 2020, Kasimi entered a small tournament in Latvia, which was not rated by FIDE so not subject to his ban from chess. He was recognised by Arturs Neikšāns, provoking anger from other players, and withdrew from the tournament.

== Personal life ==
Kasimi was first married to Olita Rause, a Latvian Woman Grandmaster, changed his surname from Kondylev to Rausis after her, and had two daughters with her. He changed his surname again – this time to Kasimi – after his second wife Ajgul Kasimova. In 2003, there were allegations that he provided "occasional help" to his wife during correspondence chess tournaments.

Kasimi was diagnosed with cancer in 2003. He had been taking medication since, and started to undergo chemotherapy from 2018 onwards. Kasimi died on March 28, 2024, at the age of 62.
