= Kathleen Murphy =

Kathleen Murphy is the name of:

- Kathleen Murphy (executive), American investment banker, lawyer, and executive
- Kathleen Murphy (politician), American state representative from Virginia
- Kathleen Murphy (martial artist) (born 1979), martial artist
- Kathleen M. Murphy (died 1963), poet

== See also ==
- Catherine Murphy (disambiguation)
