= Kate A. Murphy =

Canadian co-founder and CEO of Play Magnus (born 1985)

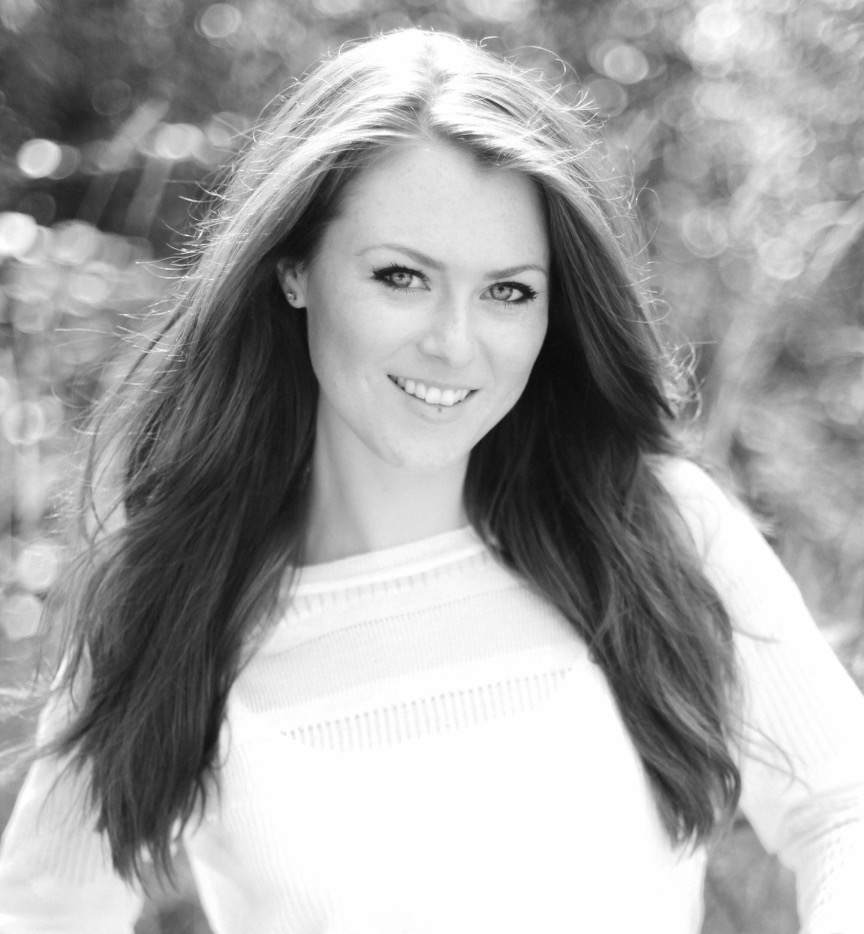
Kate A. Murphy

Kate Murphy (born May 7, 1985) is a co-founder and CEO of Play Magnus, a company previously majority owned by former World Chess Champion Magnus Carlsen and working to take chess to more people around the world with a focus on youth. Play Magnus was acquired by Chess.com in 2022.

Murphy launched Play Magnus in 2013 with Magnus Chess As (a company owned by Magnus Carlsen and chaired by his father, Henrik Carlsen), his manager Espen Agdestein and the chairman and first angel investor, Anders Brandt. Play Magnus aims to engage young people through digital products to engage their brains on their mobile device, using chess as a primary tool. She has said, "Magnus' brand is much more than just chess. It's about his brain. Smart is the new sexy. Men like Mark Zuckerberg and Elon Musk changes the way the world works. Their brains are brilliant, Magnus has the same traits".

Murphy was raised in Coquitlam, British Columbia. She attended Simon Fraser University. After graduation, she co-founded iDance Convention, a national dance convention in Canada, where she acted as director from 2008. She continued her studies at Queen's University in Kingston, Ontario, where she received an MBA in 2011 and moved to Oslo, Norway.
