= Olita (name) =

Olita is both a given name and surname. Notable people with the name include:

- Joseph Olita (1944–2014), Kenyan actor
- Olita Rause (b. 1962), Latvian chess player
