= New In Chess =

Magazine

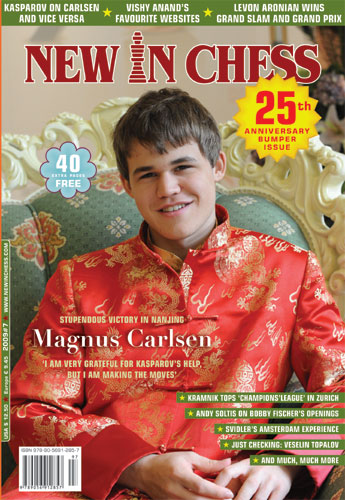
- Cover of 25th anniversary issue (2009, issue 7) depicting Magnus Carlsen on the cover
- Editor: Jan Timman and Dirk Jan ten Geuzendam
- Categories: Games
- Frequency: 6 per year
- Founded: 1984
- Country: Netherlands
- Based in: Amsterdam
- Language: English
- Website: www.newinchess.com
- ISSN: 0168-8782

New In Chess (NIC) is a chess magazine that appears six times a year, since 2026, with editors such as the Grandmaster Jan Timman and chess journalist Dirk Jan ten Geuzendam. It began publication in 1984 and contains game notes by top players and chess prodigies about their own games. Typical contributions are from players such as Anish Giri, Vladimir Kramnik, Viswanathan Anand, Péter Lékó, Judit Polgár and Magnus Carlsen. Since 2023 Remmelt Otten is editor-in-chief.

Until 2022 New In Chess also published Yearbooks four times per year that offer opening surveys and theoretical articles. NIC uses its own classification system for chess openings that continues to evolve in the effort to keep abreast of novelties. For example, FR 16.6 is the French Tarrasch with 10...g5 and a "Survey" by Tim Harding appeared in Yearbook 32 (1994). NIC also publishes books on opening theory and other chess topics.

In February 2021, it was announced that Play Magnus Group, bought the publisher of New in Chess, Interchess B.V. Subsequently, the Play Magnus Group was acquired by Chess.com, an American company.

In 2024 it was announced that New in Chess was sold to Quality Chess. The new group of chess book publishers also includes Everyman Chess and the new publisher Chess Elevation.

== See also ==
- List of chess books
- List of chess periodicals
