= Play Magnus Group =

Norwegian chess company

- Traded as: PMGMF
- Founded: October 2013
- Founders: Magnus Carlsen; Espen Agdestein; Anders Brandt
- Fate: Acquired by Chess.com
- Headquarters: Oslo, Norway

Play Magnus Group is a Norwegian chess company co-founded by chess grandmaster Magnus Carlsen in 2013. The company released the mobile app Play Magnus in 2014, before merging with chess24 in 2019 and being acquired by Chess.com in 2022.

== History ==
In October 2013, Magnus Carlsen co-founded the Oslo-based Play Magnus AS, together with his manager Espen Agdestein and entrepreneur Anders Brandt. At its founding, Carlsen owned 60% of the company and Agdestein owned 15%. Investing Carlsen's own money and that of US and Norwegian investors, Play Magnus AS then began developing Play Magnus, a mobile computer chess app. The app released in 2014, and allowed users to play against a chess engine modeled after a database of thousands of positions from recorded games Carlsen played from the age of five and up. In November 2016, Play Magnus Group launched Magnus Trainer, a chess learning app, and in 2018 launched its third mobile app, Magnus' Kingdom of Chess, a video game targeted towards young children.

=== Merge with chess24 ===
In 2019, Play Magnus AS merged with the chess website chess24, consolidating into the Play Magnus Group. Following the merge, the holding company of the two former chess24 owners (Jan Gustafsson and Enrique Guzman) became the largest shareholders in Play Magnus Group. In October 2020, Play Magnus Group was listed on the Oslo Stock Exchange. The listing raised 300 million kr (US$30.2 million) for the company, giving it a valuation of 796 million kr (US$85.8 million). After the listing, Magnus Chess, an entity controlled by Carlsen and his family, owned only 9.5% of Play Magnus Group.

=== Further acquisitions and projects ===
- In February 2019, Play Magnus Group acquired Chessable, an interactive marketplace and platform for learning chess.
- In November 2020, the group acquired U.S. website ichess.net.
- In 2020, the group conducted the first of its yearly Champions Chess Tour, beginning with the Champions Chess Tour 2021 which ran from November 2020 – October 2021.
- In February 2021, the group acquired the Dutch magazine New in Chess, and the publisher Everyman Chess in May.
- In March 2021, chess grandmaster Simon Williams joined Play Magnus Group, acquiring his website (GingerGM.com) containing chess video courses and e-books.
- In May 2021, the group acquired Aimchess, a chess analytics website.

=== Acquisition by Chess.com ===
In August 2022, Play Magnus Group accepted an offer to be acquired by Chess.com at a value of 800 million kr (US$80 million). The acquisition was officially closed on December 16, 2022. According to Dot Esports, the Play Magnus Group was unable to make a "sustainable profit" on anything but Chessable, and the merge left "no other realistic chess competitor" except the free, open-source Lichess.
