= Maria Mickiewicz =

Polish chess player (born 1984)

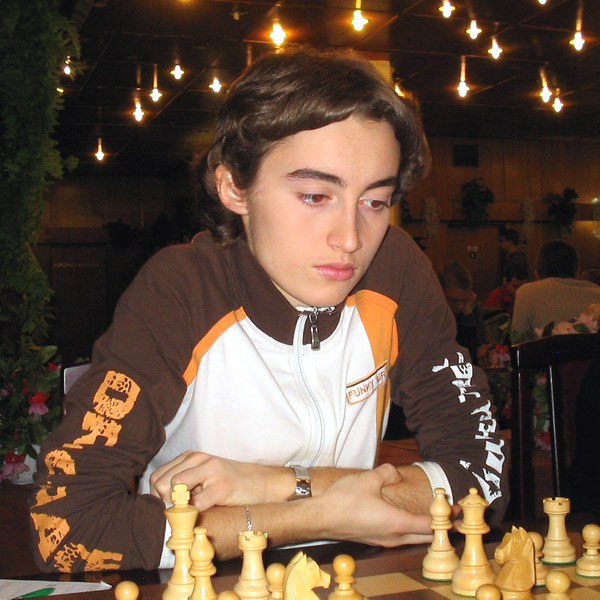
- Maria Mickiewicz in 2006

Personal information
- Born: 4 August 1984 (age 41) Kielce, Poland

Chess career
- Country: Poland
- Title: Woman International Master (2007)
- Peak rating: 2220 (July 2007)

Maria Mickiewicz (née Szymańska; born 4 August 1984) is a Polish Woman International Master (2007).

== Chess career ==
Maria has participated many times in the finals of the Polish Youth Chess Championships in all age groups, as well as in the World and European Youth Chess Championships. She achieved her first success on the national arena in 1993, winning the bronze medal at the Polish Youth Chess Championship in girls U10 age group (she repeated this achievement in 1994). In addition, Maria was a two-time gold medalist of the Polish Youth Chess Championships (in girls U14 (1997) and U18 (2001) age groups), and in 1999 in the girls U16 age group she took the 4th place. In 1996, she represented Poland at the European Youth Chess Championship, and in 1997 - at the World Youth Chess Championship. Three times in a row (2005, 2006 and 2007) she appeared in the individual finals of Polish Women's Chess Championship. In 2006, in Koszalin, Maria won the bronze medal of the Polish Women's Blitz Chess Championship. In 2002, in Zakopane Maria with chess club KSz Juvena Hańcza Suwałki won individual bronze medal in Polish Team Chess Championship.

Maria reached the highest rating in her career so far on July 1, 2007, with a score of 2220 points, she was ranked 20th among Polish female chess players. Since 2008, she very rare participated in tournaments classified by FIDE.

== Private life ==
Maria's brother Marcin is also a chess player and holds the title of International Master (IM).
