= Anders Brandt =

Norwegian serial entrepreneur (born 1960)

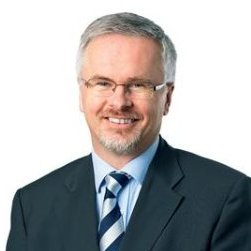
Anders Brandt

Anders Brandt (born 24 December 1960 in Oslo) is a serial entrepreneur. He is the chairman of Idekapital AS which is owned by him and his family. Brandt is part owner and chairman of the board in Magnus Carlsen's company Play Magnus, and its angel investor and first creative director.

He has close ties to Chess World Champion Magnus Carlsen and his team. Magnus Carlsen's manager Espen Agdestein is a board member at Play Magnus Group. His former colleague at Idekapital, Kate Murphy, is the CEO of Play Magnus.

Brandt bought his first computer in 1977 to learn to program. Brandt's first employment was as a copywriter. Later he became head of both an advertising agency and a market research company. In parallel with a career as a management consultant Brandt has founded and cofounded more than 20 companies during the last 30 years. Brandt held several speeches on the importance of user experience from 1995, and has written numerous articles on the subject. He has served as a board member in several companies, such as SuperOffice, EVRY, Viken Fiber, Brandmaster, Catena Media, Nimber, OMG, Mytos, Meshtech and others.
