= Marcin Szymański (chess player) =

Polish chess player

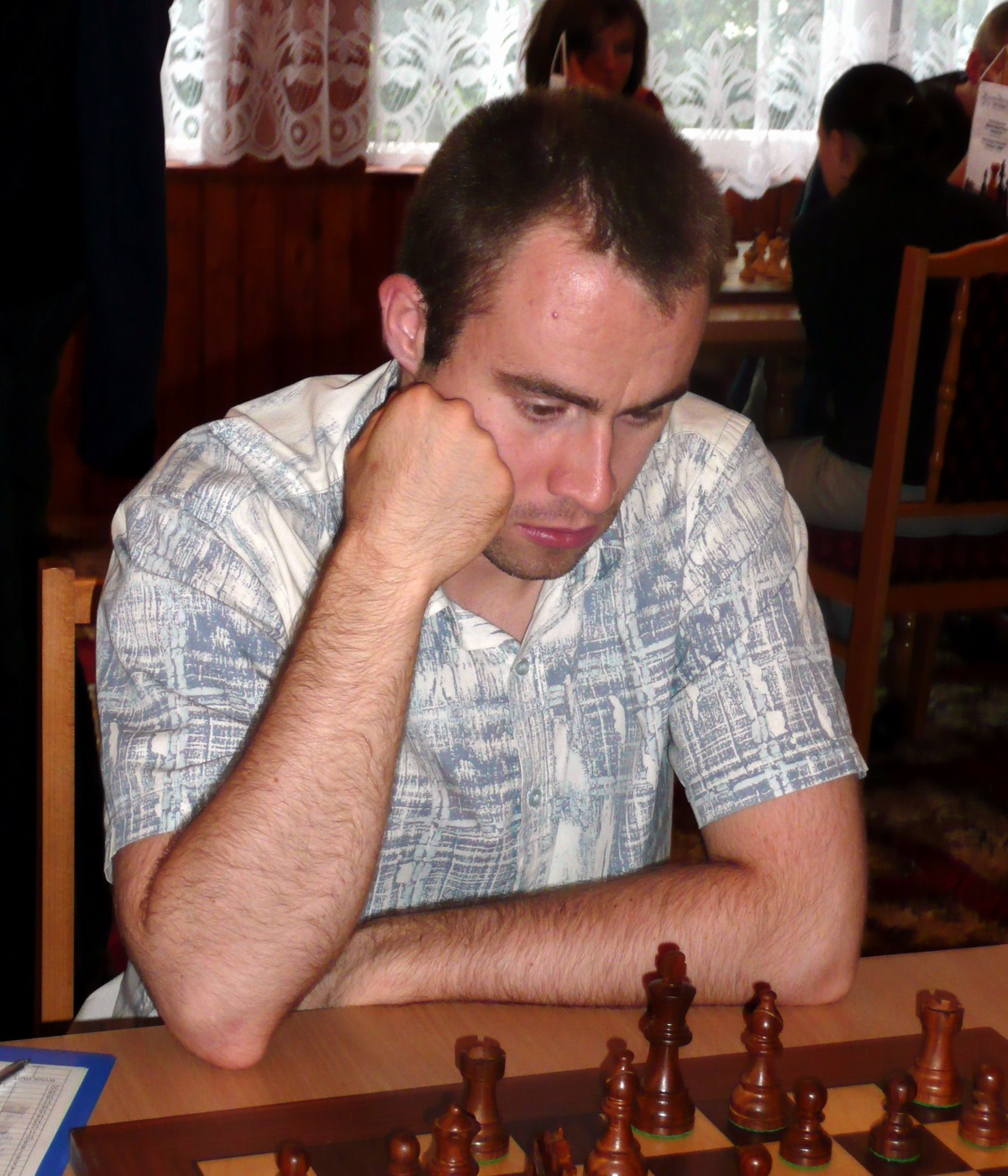
- Marcin Szymański in 2008

Personal information
- Born: 7 May 1983 (age 43) Kielce, Poland

Chess career
- Country: Poland
- Title: International Master (2003)
- Peak rating: 2435 (July 2005)

Marcin Szymański (born 7 May 1983) is a Polish International Master (2003).

== Chess career ==
Marcin Szymański participated many times in the final tournaments for the Polish Youth Chess Championships in all age groups. In 1993 he won in Grudziądz the Polish Youth Chess Championship in U10 age group. In 1998 he won silver in Krynica-Zdrój, and in 1999 in Nowa Ruda the gold medal in the Polish Youth Chess Championship in U16 age groups. In addition, he represented Poland four times (1993, 1995, 1997, 1998) at the World Youth Chess Championships and twice (1995, 1998) - at the European Youth Chess Championships. In 2001 he shared 1st place (together with Stefán Kristjánsson) in round-robin tournament in Olomouc. In the same year he won (in the colors of the chess club MKSz Rybnik) the gold medal at the Polish Youth Team Chess Championships held in Wisła. In 2003 Marcin Szymański won another international chess tournament, which took place in Suwałki and shared 1st places in swiss-system tournaments on Icaria and in Třinec. In 2005 and 2006 he won twice in international chess tournaments played in Brno. In 2011, he was second in the international tournament in Olomouc.

In 2023 Marcin Szymański won the Daily Chess Championship organized on the chess.com platform. 35,000 chess players participated in this tournament.

Marcin Szymański achieved the highest rating in his career so far on July 1, 2005, with a score of 2435 points, he was ranked 36th among Polish chess players.

== Private life ==
Marcin Szymański's sister Maria is also a chess player and holds the title of Women's International Master (WIM).
