= Catherine Murphy =

Catherine Murphy may refer to:

- Catherine Murphy (artist) (born 1946), American realist painter
- Catherine Murphy (politician) (born 1953), Irish independent politician and TD for Kildare North
- Catherine Murphy (counterfeiter) (died 1789), last woman to suffer execution by burning in England
- Catherine Murphy (sprinter) (born 1979), British Olympic athlete
- Catherine Murphy (singer), soprano singer who appeared in the American 1950s Opera Susannah
- Catherine Murphy (filmmaker), American documentarian
- Catherine J. Murphy, American chemist
- Cathy Murphy (born 1967), British actress
- Cathy Murphy (cricketer) (born 1983), Irish cricketer
- Catherine Murphy, player in 1992 All-Ireland Senior Camogie Championship
- Kathryn Mary Murphy, Canadian neuroscientist and professor
- Kathryn Murphy (The Accused), fictional character in The Accused

== See also ==
- Kate Murphy (disambiguation)
- Kathleen Murphy (disambiguation)
