= Espen Agdestein =

Norwegian chess player and manager (born 1965)

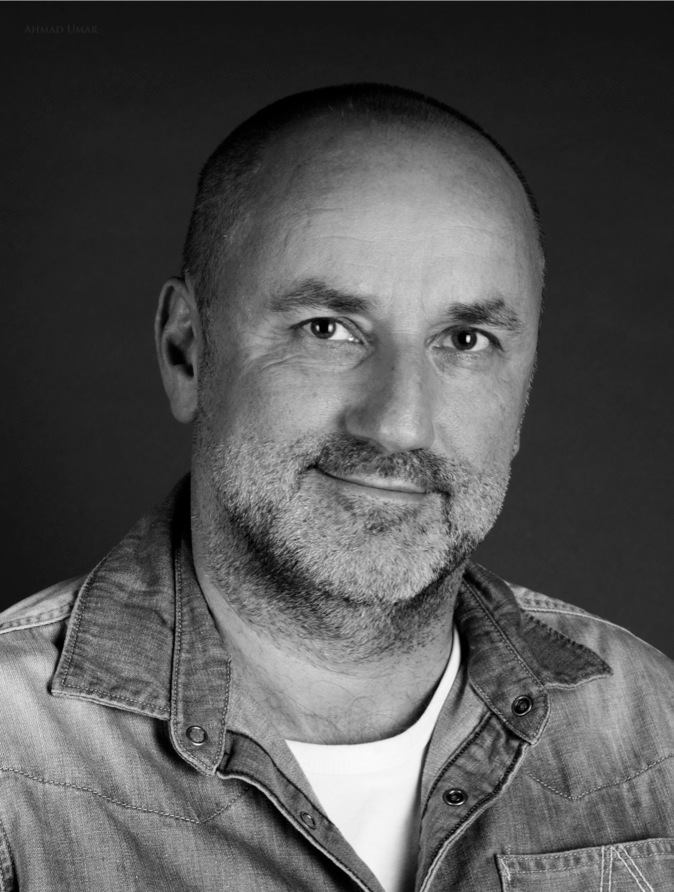

Personal information
- Born: 7 February 1965 (age 61)

Chess career
- Country: Norway
- Title: FIDE Master (1989)
- Peak rating: 2403 (July 2004)

Espen Agdestein (born 7 February 1965) is a Norwegian chess player who is the former manager of former Chess World Champion Magnus Carlsen (until 2021). He is the brother of chess grandmaster and Carlsen's former coach, Simen Agdestein, and is himself a FIDE master, with a FIDE rating of 2372.

Agdestein is one of the co-founders and partners of Idekapital, the largest Venture Capital Fund in Norway. Idekapital manages over NOK 500 million and invests in Norwegian startup companies in need of growth capital. He founded Idekapital together with Anders Brandt, Rune Holen and Kristian Øvsthus.

He is part owner and sits in the board of directors in Magnus Carlsen's company Play Magnus, where Anders Brandt is chairman and Kate Murphy is the CEO. Espen said that "Play Magnus is Magnus Carlsen's tool to bring chess to the world".

Agdestein was Carlsen's manager beginning in 2009, and according to an interview in the Norwegian newspaper Stavanger Aftenblad, the job as manager of Carlsen turned out to be more hectic than Agdestein first expected.

He founded the magazine Art of Taste in 2001 which was later bought by Hjemmet Mortensen in 2006. Agdestein worked as a director at Hjemmet Mortensen from 2006-2009. He quit his job as a director to start working as Carlsen's manager.
