= Kathryn Mary Murphy =

Canadian neuroscientist

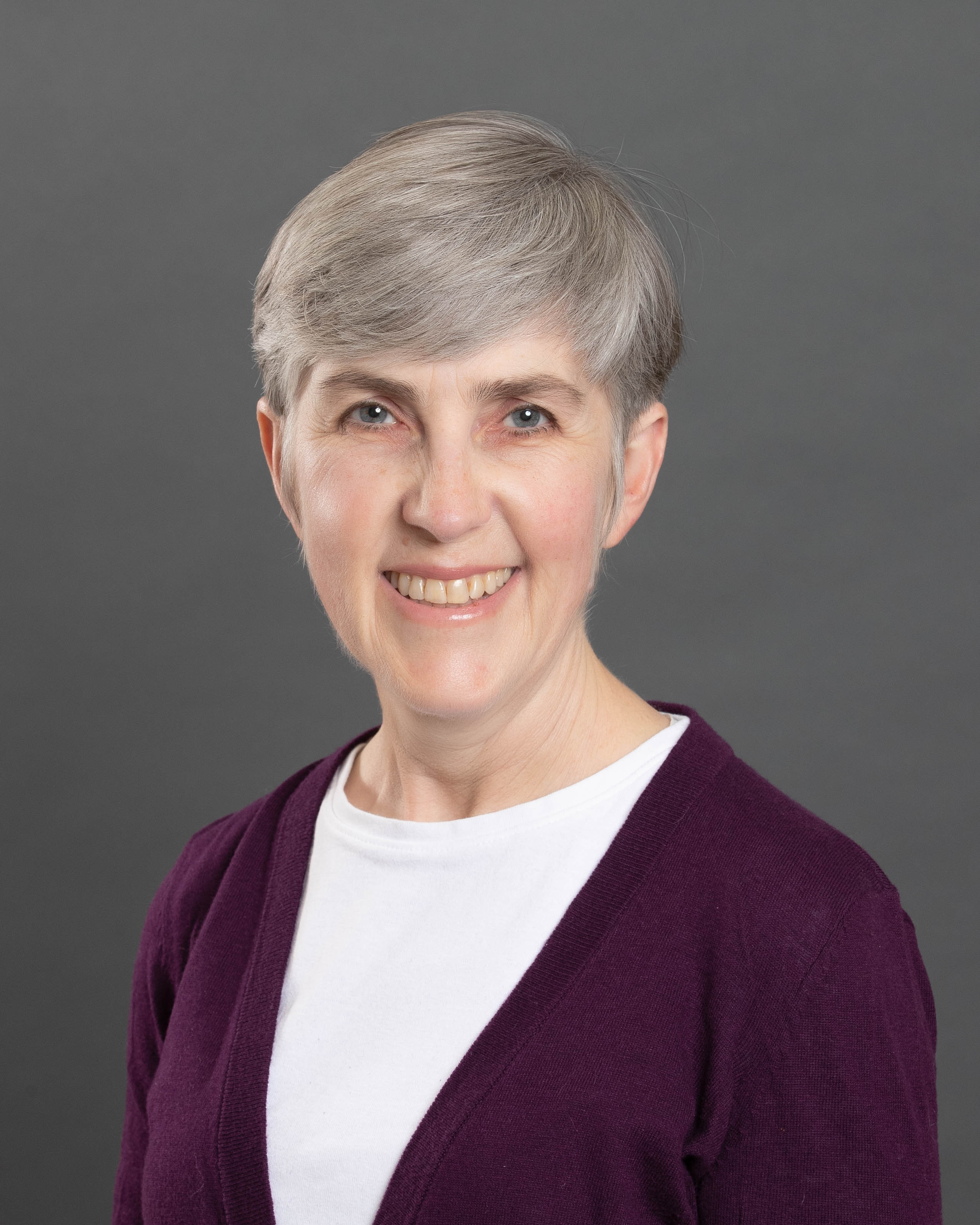

Kathryn Mary Murphy is a Canadian neuroscientist and professor who studies development and plasticity of the brain.

She has been a professor at McMaster University since 1994, where she founded the neuroscience program and prior to that was at McGill University where she won a University Research Fellowship from NSERC and a Sloan Research Fellowship from the Alfred P. Sloan Foundation.

Born in Calgary, Alberta, she grew up in Burlington, Ontario attending the University of Western Ontario for her bachelor's degree and Dalhousie University for her Masters and Ph.D. degrees. While at Dalhousie she held a Ross C. Purse scholarship from the CNIB and an NSERC Doctoral scholarship.

Her academic training took her to the University of California, Berkeley School of Optometry on postdoctoral fellowships from Fight For Sight and NSERC. For ten years (2007-2017), she was the Director of the McMaster Integrated Neuroscience Discovery & Study program (MiNDS).

Her research includes studying developmental and lifespan changes in the human brain. She has served as a Chair, Scientific Officer and Reviewer for the Canadian Institutes of Health Research (CIHR) grant selection panels and was the editor of the Synaptosomes book (ISBN 978-1-4939-8738-2) published in 2018 in the NeuroMethods Series by Springer-Nature.
