= Andrei Belozerov =

Russian chess player

Personal information
- Born: June 17, 1977 (age 49) Russia

Chess career
- Country: Russia
- Title: Grandmaster (2002)
- Peak rating: 2558 (January 2004)

Andrei Belozerov (born June 17, 1977) is a National FIDE Arbiter. He obtained International Master (IM) title in 1998 and Grandmaster (GM) title in 2002. He won the Siberian Championship in 2003, Tomsk Championship in 2004 and 2014.

== Notable tournaments ==
Tournament Name	Year	ELO	Points
Russian Championship Higher League Tournament (Sochi)	2017	2512	5.5
Izmailov mem 11th (Tomsk)	2007	2541	7.0
RUS-chT2 (Sochi)	2007	2541	6.0
EUCup 20th(Izmir)	2004	2548	4.5
Novosibirsk Open Tournament	2001	2507	9.0
Moscow-ch(Moscow)	1996	2455	7.0
RUS-chT (Briansk)	1995	2325	5.5
EU-ch U18(Zagan)	1995	2325	7.5
St Petersburg op2	1994	2320	4.5
