= Juhani Seppovaara =

Finnish photographer, illustrator, and writer (born 1947)

Juhani Seppovaara (born 1947 in Helsinki) is a Finnish photographer, illustrator, and writer. His work has focused on traditional building culture in Finland. Seppovaara's photographs have been displayed in several exhibitions, including in Paris, Madrid, and Helsinki. He is also known as a collector of DDR (East German) memorabilia.

Previously, Seppovaara worked for 25 years as an economist at the Bank of Finland. He lives in Berlin in addition to Finland.

== Works ==
- Huussi (1994)
- Mummon mökki (1995)
- Kyläkauppa (1996)
- Leikkimökki (1997)
- Matkakoti (1998)
- Suomenlinna – Tuulee kesät talvet (1999)
- Amurin työläismuseokortteli (2000)
- Kansakoulu – armas aika (2000)
- Tupa (2000)
- Olavinlinna – Kivestä syntyi laulu (2001)
- Elävä hiljaisuus – Hietaniemen hautausmailla (Living Silence – In the Hietaniemi Cemetery) (2002)
- Maatilan pihapiiri (Farmyards) (2003)
- Muistojen markkinoilla – sinivalkoisen arjen klassikot (Marketplace of Memories – Everyday Finnish Classics) (2004)
- Tuusulanjärven taiteilijaelämää (The Artistic Life of Tuusulanjärvi) (2005)
- Itä-Berliinin taivaan alla (Under the East Berlin Sky) (2006)
  - Unter dem Himmel Ostberlins (2008, German translation)
- Puusuomen uhanalainen runous (The Endangered Poetry of Finnish Wood) (2007)
- Mopolla Suomeen (By Moped Through Finland) (2007)
  - Mit dem Moped durch Finnland (2014, German translation)
- Kirkosta savusaunaan – Puusta rakennettu Suomi (From Churches to Smoke Saunas – A Finland Built of Wood) (2008)
- Elämän kortit (Sights of a Life) (2014)
  - Ansichten eines Lebens (2014, German translation)
- Oodi Berliinille (2021)
- Shakkimestari (2024)
