= Borislav Ivanov =

Bulgarian chess player (born 1987)

Borislav Krastev Ivanov
Personal information
- Born: 21 December 1987 (age 38) Blagoevgrad, Bulgaria

Chess career
- Country: Bulgaria
- Peak rating: 2342 (January 2013)

Borislav Krastev Ivanov (Bulgarian: Борислав Кръстев Иванов; born 21 December 1987) is a Bulgarian chess player. During 2012 and 2013 his results improved significantly, and he beat several grandmasters. This led to cheating accusations against him, and he was subsequently banned by the Bulgarian Chess Federation in December 2013, stripped of his FIDE Master title and excluded from FIDE's rating list in January 2014.

== Chess career ==
Ivanov currently mainly resides in Blagoevgrad, where he was born. He was enrolled as a pedagogy student at the South-West University and subsequently studied law at the same university, becoming interested in pursuing a legal career as a result of the chess controversies he had found himself in. His first coach was Marin Atanasov from Victory Club in Blagoevgrad and his chess idols are Veselin Topalov and Tigran Petrosyan. In August 2012, Ivanov won the Balkan chess festival for non-professionals held in Belogradchik.

His major breakthrough came at the strong 2012 Zadar Open chess tournament in Croatia held between 16 and 22 December, during which he finished in fourth place after defeating a number of higher-ranked players and also increased his Elo rating by 70 points. His tournament record against the grandmasters he faced was 3 wins, 2 draws and 1 loss. It was alleged that he had been using outside help, but no evidence was uncovered and Ivanov received an apology and an invitation to future tournaments from the organizers. At the time, Ivanov's achievement was lauded by key figures from the Bulgarian Chess Federation and he was personally congratulated by executive director Nikolay Velchev, who saw in him a future member of the Bulgarian national chess team.

On 14 April 2013, Ivanov defeated grandmaster Kiril Georgiev in a tournament held in Kyustendil, eventually winning the competition after finishing joint first with Grigor Grigorov, scoring 7½/9 points (securing the victory due to tiebreaker criteria). Kiril Georgiev alleged irregularities in the nature of Ivanov's tournament play.

In April 2013, in part due to accusations levelled against Ivanov during his previous tournament victory, more than twenty Bulgarian Grandmasters and International Masters signed a petition that they will not participate in chess tournaments together with Ivanov unless special anti-cheating measures are taken. Shortly after that the Bulgarian Chess Federation banned him for four months on ethics grounds—due to comments made about other chess players rather than the suspicions of cheating. In response to the controversy, Grandmaster Veselin Topalov, ranked No. 1 in Bulgaria, stated in an interview on 21 May 2013 that there is no evidence that Ivanov is cheating, and that "it's simply stupid to blame a chess player for performing well on the board". The validity of the chess federation's decision was disputed in court and Ivanov received support from Blagoevgrad city councillors (who sent out a protest note to the chess federation) as well as public figures from other cities.

In June 2013, the administrative court of Sofia stated that the sanction imposed on Ivanov by the chess federation had violated proper legal procedures, essentially confirming that Ivanov is free to participate in tournaments. On 19 June 2013 the Bulgarian Chess Federation organized an event (including a lie detector) that was supposed to clear Ivanov from the cheating accusations, but Ivanov did not appear. In a letter addressed to the chess federation, Ivanov said that he had been unable to make it to Sofia on the chosen date due to his intended participation in the Varna Open chess tournament (enabled by the recent lifting of the four-month ban by the administrative court) in particular and his tight schedule in general.

He also expressed a willingness to undergo all the necessary tests, but under the condition that he is notified of the next such possibility at least 15 days in advance and is accompanied by his lawyer Mihail Ekimdzhiev. However, in Ivanov's view, the Bulgarian Chess Federation has refused to offer him any further opportunities to subject himself to rigorous testing of that nature.

== Retirement from competitive chess and brief return ==
On 4 October 2013, Ivanov announced his retirement from competitive chess. Ivanov's retirement came shortly after a controversial performance in a tournament in Blagoevgrad, in which Ivanov, among other things, voluntarily forfeited his games after refusing to be searched for suspected cheating devices, was observed walking in a "gangsta" fashion with a limp, and referred to one of his opponents, Grandmaster Maxim Dlugy, as a "clown". Maxim Dlugy suspected that he was cheating with a device in his shoe. His friend working as a hacker with the defense ministry was helping him with a Morse code pulse device in his shoe. According to Ivanov's version of the events, Dlugy had brought his own personal security officer to the tournament room during the competition in question in violation of procedure (Dlugy's guard eventually heeded the tournament officials' request to leave the competition room). Dlugy is also alleged to have applied pressure on chess referee Dimitar Iliev to extensively search Ivanov and require him to take off his shoes, which the latter refused, resulting in a loss by default for Ivanov.

On 26 and 27 October 2013, Ivanov participated in the rapid chess Nayden Voynov Memorial Tournament in Vidin, scoring 6½/9 points and finishing 7th out of 61 players.

In early December 2013, Ivanov played in the classical chess tournament XIX Open Int. Navalmoral de la Mata in Cáceres, Spain. After five rounds, he had scored 4½/5 points and was tied for the lead, ahead of 19 grandmasters. Ivanov was then excluded from the tournament, amid conflicting reports about the circumstances. The organisers subsequently issued a press release. According to the release, Ivanov had agreed to have his shoes searched after round 4, and no suspicious devices were found. However, suspicions were expressed about an apparent bulge in his back; one of the participants reported that he felt the bulge and concluded that it was an electronic device. Before his next scheduled game, his opponent, the Azerbaijani Grandmaster Namig Guliyev, asked that Ivanov be searched. While he was being frisked, Ivanov became agitated and refused to allow the search to continue. He then withdrew from the tournament. Ivanov has expressed disappointment regarding the way in which he was treated by his chess opponents and the general atmosphere surrounding the tournament in Spain. Prior to that, he had not been granted permission to compete in a tournament in Milan. On 8 December 2013, the Bulgarian Chess Federation banned Ivanov permanently.

The FIDE Ethics Commission opened case 1/2014 against Ivanov via a report from the Executive Director. However, the case was not listed in the September 2015 commission report (neither in the list of concluded cases nor in the list of pending cases).

== Other pursuits ==
Ivanov has also been employed as a chess coach and in 2014 was studying law at South-West University in Blagoevgrad.

== Media appearances ==
In June 2013, he discussed his situation on the popular television talk show Slavi's Show, during which the host Slavi Trifonov also engaged in a telephone conversation with the vice-president of the chess federation Plamen Mollov.

== Arrest and alleged forgery ring ==
In March 2017, Ivanov was arrested in Kyustendil due to allegedly masterminding a group engaged in forging driver's licenses and selling them on the Internet. The authorities were alerted to the scam by presenters from the comedy TV show Gospodari Na Efira.
