= Chess24 =

Internet chess server

chess24.com
- Website type: Internet chess server
- Available in: Chinese; English; French; German; Italian; Norwegian; Polish; Portuguese; Russian; Spanish; Turkish
- Dissolved: January 31, 2024; 2 years ago
- Owners: Play Magnus Group (2019–2022); Chess.com (2022–2024)
- Website: chess24.com
- Registration: Yes
- Launched: 2014
- Current status: Defunct

chess24.com was an Internet chess server in English and ten other languages, established in 2014 by German grandmaster Jan Gustafsson and Enrique Guzman. chess24 also provided live coverage of major international chess tournaments, and hosted their own online tournaments, including the Magnus Carlsen Invitational.

In March 2019, chess24 merged with Magnus Carlsen's company Play Magnus AS in a transaction that made the former chess24 owners the largest shareholders in Play Magnus. In 2022, Play Magnus was purchased by Chess.com, which made Chess.com the owner of chess24.

In December 2023, the chess24 team announced that they would be closing their site and apps by the end of January 2024. The website officially closed down on January 31, 2024, and its address began redirecting to the Chess.com news page and later its events page.

== Features ==
A 2020 review by IM Luis Torres put chess24 as one of the three most popular internet chess servers, alongside Chess.com and Lichess. Similarly to other chess servers, chess24 offered the ability to play online against other users or bots, enter online tournaments hosted on the site and view your own statistics. Torres ranked Chess.com the best overall, but chess24 as the best for improving one's game.

There was also an option of paying for premium membership on chess24. Going premium allowed deeper Stockfish analysis and also participation in events such as Banter Blitz, which allowed Premium members to play with collaborators of chess24. Reviews tended to favour rivals Chess.com and Lichess in terms of the playing experience, while suggesting that chess24 had richer educational video content, and probably a better interface for tournament monitoring.

== Tournaments ==
chess24 provided live coverage of major international tournaments on the website and also on YouTube with commentary by players such as Yasser Seirawan, Peter Leko, and Tania Sachdev. They also hosted and sponsored their own events, especially after their acquisition by Play Magnus AS. From September 2019 to April 2020, chess24 held the first international Banter Blitz Cup, an online Blitz Chess tournament featuring players such as Magnus Carlsen, Gata Kamsky, Rameshbabu Praggnanandhaa, Parham Maghsoodloo, David Antón Guijarro and Leinier Domínguez with a $50,000 prize pool for players and $5,000 for streamers. It was won by Alireza Firouzja in the final against Magnus Carlsen.

From April to May 2020, with face-to-face tournament play impossible because of Covid-19 travel bans and lockdowns, chess24 held the Magnus Carlsen Invitational, an online Rapid Chess tournament which was won by Magnus Carlsen. This was expanded to form a conceptual tour including the Lindores Abbey Rapid Challenge, and culminating in a Grand Final, featuring Magnus Carlsen and Hikaru Nakamura. The 2021 edition was hosted in March 2021, also online, and saw the favourite Magnus Carlsen being knocked out in the semifinal by Ian Nepomniachtchi, who eventually lost in the final to Dutch Grandmaster Anish Giri.

== See also ==
- List of Internet chess platforms
