= Olita Rause =

Latvian chess player (born 1962)

Personal information
- Born: November 21, 1962 (age 63) Soviet Union
- Spouse: Igors Rausis

Chess career
- Country: Soviet Union; Latvia
- Title: FIDE Woman Grandmaster (1993); FIDE International Master (1995); ICCF Grandmaster (1998)
- FIDE rating: 2192 (June 2019)
- Peak rating: 2360 (July 1994)
- ICCF rating: 2684 (October 2005)
- ICCF peak rating: 2721 (October 2002)

Olita Rause (born November 21, 1962) is a Latvian chess player who holds the FIDE titles of Woman Grandmaster (WGM, 1993) and International Master (IM, 1995). She also holds the ICCF title of Correspondence Grandmaster (GM, 1998).

== Chess career ==
Rause won the silver medal in Latvian Chess Championship for women three times: 1981 (tournament won by Astra Goldmane), 1984 (tournament won by Anda Šafranska), 1994 (after she lost additional match against Anda Šafranska - 1½:2½). In 1986, Rause played for Latvia in Soviet Women's Team Chess Championship in Minsk at second board.

Rause played for Latvia in Chess Olympiads:

- In 1994, at second board in the 31st Chess Olympiad in Moscow (+4, -4, =3).

Rause is one of strongest world's correspondence chess players. She won the ICCF World Cup VI tournament.

== Personal life ==
Rause graduated from the University of Latvia with a Master of Philology degree. From December 2001 to February 2017 she worked as the editor in chief for Janis Roze Publishers in Riga. Rause was married to Igors Rausis.
