= Kathleen Murphy (martial artist) =

American martial artist

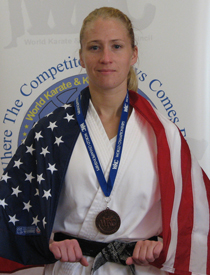
- World Championships in Cádiz, Spain

Personal information
- Nickname: Katie
- Born: April 13, 1979 (age 47) La Grange, New York, United States
- Height: 5 ft 9 in (1.75 m)

Sport
- Country: United States
- Sport: Karate
Medal record
Women's karate
Representing the United States
World Martial Arts Games
Gold medal – first place	2012 Bregenz	Traditional Forms
Gold medal – first place	2012 Bregenz	Traditional Weapons
Gold medal – first place	2012 Bregenz	Creative Forms
Gold medal – first place	2012 Bregenz	Musical Forms
World Karate and Kickboxing Council (WKC)
Gold medal – first place	2014 Dublin	Creative Forms
Gold medal – first place	2014 Dublin	Traditional Forms
Silver medal – second place	2014 Dublin	Traditional Weapons
Silver medal – second place	2014 Dublin	Classical Forms
Gold medal – first place	2012 Montreal	Creative Forms
Silver medal – second place	2012 Montreal	Traditional Forms
Bronze medal – third place	2012 Montreal	Traditional Weapons
Gold medal – first place	2011 Cádiz	Traditional Weapons
Gold medal – first place	2011 Cádiz	Creative Forms
Bronze medal – third place	2011 Cádiz	Traditional Forms
Bronze medal – third place	2011 Cádiz	Creative Weapons
Bronze medal – third place	2011 Cádiz	Team Point Fighting
Silver medal – second place	2010 Albufeira	Traditional Weapons
Bronze medal – third place	2010 Albufeira	Traditional Forms
Bronze medal – third place	2010 Albufeira	Team Point Fighting

Kathleen (Katie) Murphy
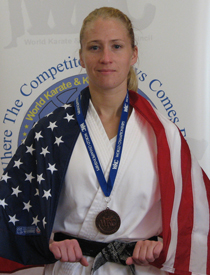
- World Championships in Cádiz, Spain
- Born: April 13, 1979 (age 47); La Grange, New York
- Nationality: American
- Height: 5 ft 9 in (1.75 m)
- Style: USA Goju-Ryu Karate
- Rank: Yodan

Other information
- University: Western Connecticut University
- Last updated on: November 14, 2012

Kathleen Murphy (born April 13, 1979), known as Katie Murphy, is an American martial artist. She is a twenty-two time World Champion in karate, a fifteen-time U.S. National Champion, and a ten-time New York State Champion. In 2012, Murphy was awarded "2011 Female Competitor of the Year" by Action Martial Arts magazine.

== Personal life ==
Murphy was born and raised in LaGrange, New York. The second oldest of nine children, she started her martial arts training as a teenager in 1991. She earned her first black belt (Shodan) in USA Gōjū-ryū karate in 1996 (two weeks after her 17th birthday) under Sensei Thomas Maloney and Sensei Joseph Rinaldi. She was awarded her Fourth degree Black Belt (Yodan) from her instructors in 2010.

She was the Head Instructor of the Unionvale, New York Martial Arts Dojo until it ceased operation in 2014. She earned her Ed.D. degree from Western Connecticut State University in 2014. Dr. Murphy and her husband David Kalish currently live in the Hudson Valley, New York.

She currently trains at the Fighting Spirit Karate Studio in New Paltz, New York, under Shidoshi Sean Schenker. Recently, Katie has expanded her martial arts journey, training in Goju-Ryu, Kyokushin, Shotokan, Judo, and Krav Maga.

== Career highlights ==
=== 2007 ===
Competition	Category	Result
Karate Rating Association of New England (KRANE) Nationals	18-29 Women's Traditional Forms	Bronze medalist
New York State Martial Arts Karate Championships	18-29 Women's Point Sparring	New York State Champion
Bushido Challenge Karate Tournament	Women's Forms	Gold medalist
Bushido Challenge Karate Tournament	Women's Weapons	Gold medalist

=== 2008 ===
Competition	Category	Result
Karate Rating Association of New England (KRANE)	18-29 Women's Traditional Forms	New York State Champion
Karate Rating Association of New England (KRANE)	18-29 Women's Traditional Weapons	New York State Champion
Karate Rating Association of New England (KRANE)	18-29 Women's Point Sparring	New York State Champion
KRANE Nationals	18-29 Women's Traditional Forms	Bronze medalist
KRANE Nationals	18-29 Women's Traditional Weapons	Bronze medalist

=== 2009 ===
Competition	Category	Result
Karate Rating Association of New England (KRANE) Nationals	30-39 Women's Traditional Forms	US National Champion
KRANE Nationals	30-39 Women's Traditional Weapons	US National Champion
KRANE	30-39 Women's Traditional Forms	US National Champion
KRANE	30-39 Women's Traditional Weapons	New York State Champion
KRANE	30-39 Women's Point Sparring	New York State Champion
KRANE	30-39 Women's Traditional Weapons	Triple Crown Winner

=== 2010 ===
Location	Competition	Category	Result
Albufeira, Portugal	WKC World Championships	18-34 Traditional Weapons	Silver medalist
Albufeira, Portugal	WKC World Championships	18-34 Traditional Hard Style Weapons	Bronze medalist
Albufeira, Portugal	WKC World Championships	Women's Team Point Sparring	Bronze medalist
Detroit, MI	WKC Nationals	18-34 Traditional Forms	US National Champion
Detroit, MI	WKC Nationals	18-34 Traditional Hard Style Weapons	US National Champion
New York (NY)	Karate Rating Association of New England (KRANE)	30-39 Women's Traditional Forms	New York State Champion
New York (NY)	Karate Rating Association of New England (KRANE)	30-39 Women's Traditional Weapons	New York State Champion
New York (NY)	KRANE Nationals	30-39 Women's Traditional Forms	US National Champion
New York (NY)	KRANE Nationals	30-39 Women's Traditional Weapons	US National Champion
	KRANE	30-39 Women's Traditional Forms	Triple Crown Winner
	KRANE	30-39 Women's Traditional Weapons	Triple Crown Winner
New York, NY	Twin Towers Classic Tournament	Women's Forms	Grand Champion
New York, NY	Twin Towers Classic Tournament	Women's Weapons	Grand Champion

=== 2011 ===
Location	Competition	Category	Result
Orlando, FL	US Martial Arts Games	26-35 Adult Blackbelt Traditional Weapons	Bronze Medalist
Orlando, FL	US Martial Arts Games	26-35 Adult Blackbelt Creative Weapons	Silver Medalist
Orlando, FL	US Martial Arts Games	26-35 Adult Blackbelt Traditional Forms	Silver Medalist
Orlando, FL	US Martial Arts Games	26-35 Adult Blackbelt Creative Forms	Silver Medalist
Cádiz, Spain	World Karate and Kickboxing Council (WKC) World Championships	18-34 Traditional Weapons	World Champion
Cádiz, Spain	World Karate and Kickboxing Council (WKC) World Championships	18-34 Traditional Weapons	World Champion
Cádiz, Spain	World Karate and Kickboxing Council (WKC) World Championships	18-34 Creative Forms	World Champion
Cádiz, Spain	World Karate and Kickboxing Council (WKC) World Championships	18-34 Traditional Hard Style Forms	Bronze medalist
Cádiz, Spain	World Karate and Kickboxing Council (WKC) World Championships	18-34 Creative Weapons	Bronze medalist
Cádiz, Spain	World Karate and Kickboxing Council (WKC) World Championships	Women's Team Point Sparring	Bronze medalist
Detroit, MI	World Karate and Kickboxing Council (WKC) US Nationals	18-34 Traditional Forms	National Champion
Detroit, MI	World Karate and Kickboxing Council (WKC) US Nationals	18-34 Creative Forms	National Champion
Detroit, MI	World Karate and Kickboxing Council (WKC) US Nationals	18-34 Traditional Hard Style Weapons	National Champion
New York (NY)	Karate Rating Association of New England (KRANE) New York State Champion	30-39 Women's Traditional Forms	New York State Champion
New York (NY)	Karate Rating Association of New England (KRANE) New York State Champion	30-39 Women's Traditional Weapons	New York State Champion
	North American Sport Karate Association (NASKA)	Women's 30-39 Traditional Forms	2nd place
	North American Sport Karate Association (NASKA)	Women's 30-39 Traditional Weapons	3rd place
Philadelphia, PA	Amerikick Internationals	Women's 30+ Weapons	Grand Champion
Philadelphia, PA	Amerikick Internationals	Women's 30+ Forms	Grand Champion
Marlborough, MA	New England Open Karate Championship	Women's 30+ Weapons	Grand Champion
Marlborough, MA	New England Open Karate Championship	Women's 30+ Forms	Grand Champion
New York (NY)	Twin Towers Karate Tournament	Women's 30+ Weapons	Grand Champion

=== 2012 ===
Location	Competition	Category	Result
	North American Sport Karate Association (NASKA)	Women's 30-39 Traditional Forms	World Champion
	North American Sport Karate Association (NASKA)	Women's 30-39 Creative Forms	World Champion
	North American Sport Karate Association (NASKA)	Women's 30-39 Traditional Weapons	World Champion
Philadelphia, PA	Amerikick Internationals	Women's 30+ Weapons	Grand Champion
Philadelphia, PA	Amerikick Internationals	Women's 30+ Forms	Grand Champion
Daytona Beach, FL	Gator Nationals	Women's 30+ Forms	Grand Champion
Marlborough, MA	New England Open Karate Championship	Women's 30+ Weapons	Grand Champion
Marlborough, MA	New England Open Karate Championship	Women's 30+ Forms	Grand Champion
Orlando, FL	US Open ISKA World Martial Arts Championships	Women's 30+ Forms	Grand Champion
Washington, DC	US Capitol Classics / China Open	Women's 30+ Forms	Grand Champion
New York, NY	Twin Towers Karate Tournament	Women's 30+ Forms	Grand Champion
New York, NY	Twin Towers Karate Tournament	Women's 30+ Weapons	Grand Champion
Miami, FL	Pan American Internationals / WKF World Championships	Women's 30+ Forms	Grand Champion
Bregenz, Austria	US Martial Arts Games	26-35 Women's Black Belt Traditional Weapons	World Champion
Bregenz, Austria	US Martial Arts Games	26-35 Women's Black Belt Traditional Forms	World Champion
Bregenz, Austria	US Martial Arts Games	26-35 Women's Black Belt Musical Forms	World Champion
Bregenz, Austria	US Martial Arts Games	26-35 Women's Black Belt Creative Forms	World Champion
	World Karate and Kickboxing Council (WKC)	United States National Team Member	
Montreal, Canada	WKC World Championships	18-34 Creative Forms	World Champion
Montreal, Canada	WKC World Championships	18-34 Traditional Forms	Silver medalist
Montreal, Canada	WKC World Championships	18-34 Traditional Weapons	Bronze medalist
Detroit, MI	WKC Nationals	18-34 Traditional Forms	US National Champion
Detroit, MI	WKC Nationals	18-34 Creative Forms	US National Champion
Detroit, MI	WKC Nationals	18-34 Traditional Hard Style Weapons	Silver medalist

=== 2013 ===
Location	Competition	Category	Result
	North American Sport Karate Association (NASKA)	Women's 30+ Overall Forms Grand Champion	World Grand Champion
	North American Sport Karate Association (NASKA)	Women's 30+ Overall Weapons Grand Champion	World Grand Champion
	North American Sport Karate Association (NASKA)	Women's 30-39 Traditional Forms	World Champion
	North American Sport Karate Association (NASKA)	Women's 30-39 Creative Forms	World Champion
	North American Sport Karate Association (NASKA)	Women's 30-39 Traditional Weapons	World Champion
Philadelphia, PA	Amerikick Internationals	Women's 30+ Weapons Grand Champion	World Champion
Philadelphia, PA	Amerikick Internationals	Women's 30+ Forms Grand Champion	World Champion
Warwick, RI	Ocean States Grand Nationals	Women's 30+ Weapons	Grand champion
Warwick, RI	Ocean States Grand Nationals	Women's 30+ Forms	Grand champion
Quebec, Canada	Quebec City Open Karate Championship	Women's 30+ Weapons	Grand champion
Marlborough, MA	New England Open Karate Championship	Women's 30+ Weapons	Grand champion
Marlborough, MA	New England Open Karate Championship	Women's 30+ Forms	Grand champion
Myrtle Beach, SC	Dixieland Nationals Karate Championship	Women's 30+ Forms	Grand Champion
Myrtle Beach, SC	Dixieland Nationals Karate Championship	Women's 30+ Weapons	Grand Champion
Detroit, MI	World Karate and Kickboxing Council (WKC) Nationals	18-34 Creative Forms	US National Champion
Detroit, MI	World Karate and Kickboxing Council (WKC) Nationals	18-34 Traditional Hard Style Weapons	US National Champion
Detroit, MI	World Karate and Kickboxing Council (WKC) Nationals	18-34 Traditional Forms	Silver Medal Winner
	Karate Rating Association of New England (KRANE)	30-39 Women's Traditional Forms	US National Champion
	Karate Rating Association of New England (KRANE)	30-39 Women's Traditional Weapons	US National Champion

=== 2014 ===
Location	Competition	Category	Result
	North American Sport Karate Association (NASKA)	Women 30-39 Creative Forms Division	World Champion
	North American Sport Karate Association (NASKA)	Women 30-39 Traditional Weapons Division	World Champion
	North American Sport Karate Association (NASKA)	Women 30-39 Traditional Forms Division	2nd place
Philadelphia, PA	Amerikick Internationals	30+ Forms Grand Champion	World Champion
Warwick, RI	Ocean States Grand Nationals	Women's 30+ Weapons	Grand Champion
Warwick, RI	Ocean States Grand Nationals	Women's 30+ Forms	Grand Champion
Marlborough, MA	New England Open Karate Championship	Women's 30+ Weapons	Grand Champion
Marlborough, MA	New England Open Karate Championship	Women's 30+ Forms	Grand Champion
New York, NY	Twin Towers Classic Karate Championship	Women's 30+ Forms	Grand Champion
New York, NY	Twin Towers Classic Karate Championship	Women's 30+ Weapons	Grand Champion
Dublin, Ireland	World Karate and Kickboxing Council (WKC) World Championships	18-34 Traditional Forms	Gold Medal Winner
Dublin, Ireland	World Karate and Kickboxing Council (WKC) World Championships	18-34 Creative Forms	World Champion
Dublin, Ireland	World Karate and Kickboxing Council (WKC) World Championships	18-34 Traditional Hard Style Weapons	Silver medal
Dublin, Ireland	World Karate and Kickboxing Council (WKC) World Championships	18+ Classical Forms	Silver medal
Detroit, MI	WKC Nationals	18-34 Creative Forms	US National Champion
Detroit, MI	WKC Nationals	18-34 Traditional Hard Style Weapons	US National Champion
Detroit, MI	WKC Nationals	18-34 Traditional Forms	Silver medal
New York, (NY)	New York Tournament League (NYT)	Adult Black Belt Forms	Overall Grand Champion
New York, (NY)	New York Tournament League (NYT)	Adult Black Belt Weapons	Overall Grand Champion
New York, (NY)	NYT Nationals	Black Belt Forms	US National Champion
New York, (NY)	New York State Championships	Black Belt Forms	New York State Champion
New York, (NY)	Long Island Summer Open	Black Belt Weapons	Grand Champion
