= Maxim Dlugy =

American chess grandmaster (born 1966)

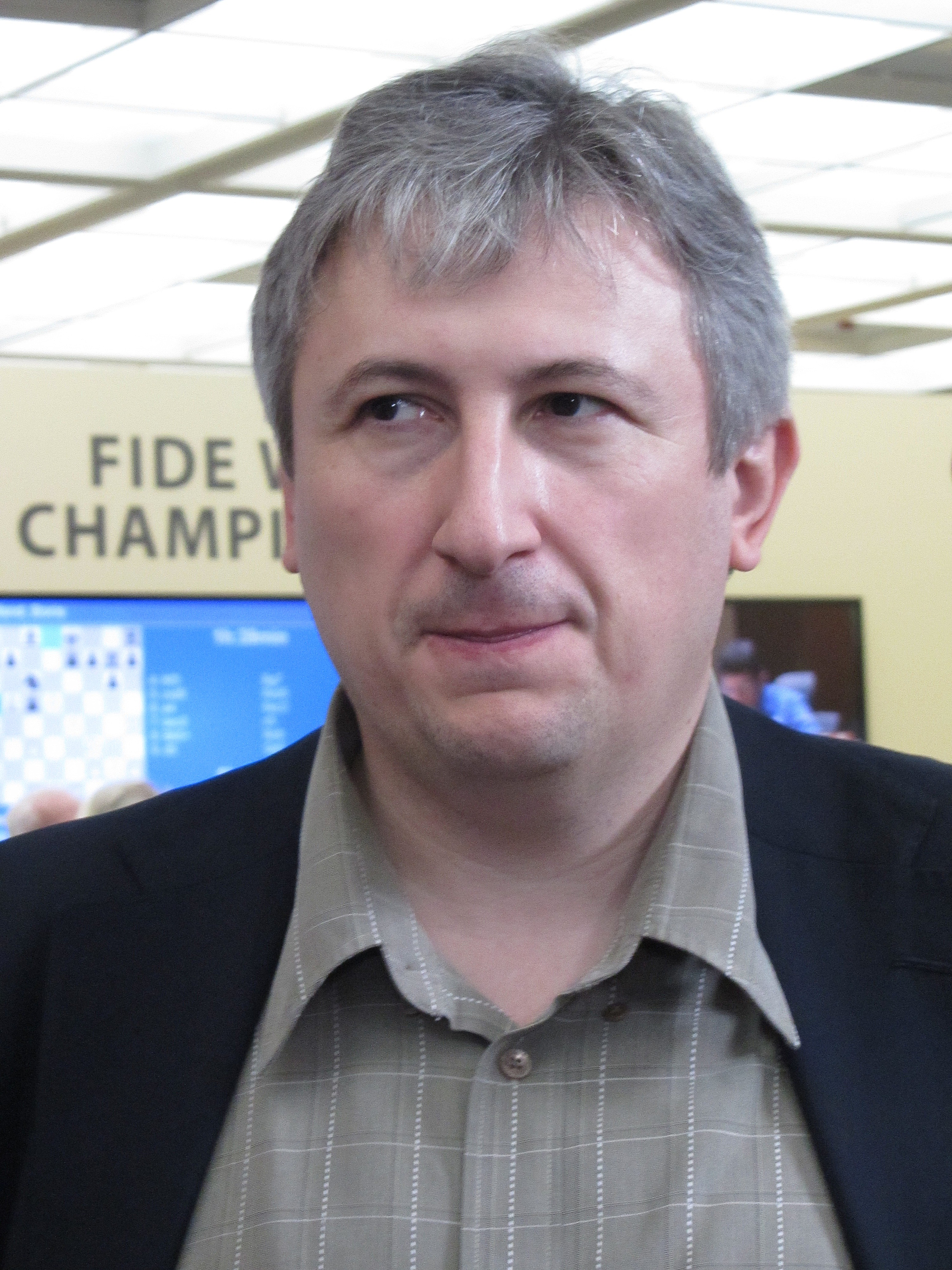
- Dlugy at the press room of the World Chess Championship 2012, Moscow

Personal information
- Born: Maxim Alexandrovich Dlugy; January 29, 1966 (age 60) Moscow, Soviet Union

Chess career
- Country: United States
- Title: Grandmaster (1986)
- FIDE rating: 2496 (July 2026)
- Peak rating: 2570 (January 1989)
- Peak ranking: No. 42 (January 1986)

Maxim Alexandrovich Dlugy (born January 29, 1966) is an American chess player with the FIDE title of Grandmaster. He was born in Moscow, USSR, and arrived with his family in the United States in 1977. He was awarded the International Master title in 1982. He won the World Junior Chess Championship in 1985. He was awarded the Grandmaster title in 1986 for his result at the World Chess Olympiad in Dubai, United Arab Emirates. At this event, he played on the U.S. team, which was in first place going into the last round. Always a strong speed chess player, Dlugy was formerly ranked number one in the world by the World Blitz Chess Association.

== Chess career highlights ==
In 1984, he finished 3rd in the U.S. Chess Championship. He was 2nd in New York 1985, 2nd in Clichy 1986–87 and 3rd in the 1987 U.S. Chess Championship. He graduated from the Dalton School in New York City in 1984. Dlugy won the 1988 World Open in Philadelphia, defeating GM Nick de Firmian in the last round, to claim the $25,000 first prize, at the time the largest prize for chess in North American history. Dlugy was elected president of the United States Chess Federation in 1990. That same year, he was the first chess grandmaster hired by IBM to work on the Deep Blue chess computer project.

In March 2006, after returning to the U.S., Dlugy received a special invitation to play in the U.S. Chess Championship in San Diego, California. He achieved a plus score. Dlugy was one of the campaign managers along with Garry Kasparov for Anatoly Karpov when he ran for FIDE President in Khanty-Mansiysk, Siberia, in 2010. Dlugy operates Chess Max Academy, a chess school with locations in New York City and Connecticut.

=== Cheating allegations ===
In 2013, Dlugy helped investigate a cheating scandal involving Bulgarian FM Borislav Ivanov, who, according to Dlugy, was using a device in his shoe that signaled him what moves to make. Ivanov was subsequently banned by the Bulgarian Chess Federation. On two separate occasions in 2017 and 2020, Dlugy was suspected of, and later admitted to, having cheated himself in a Titled Tuesday online tournament run by Chess.com. The incident received renewed attention after Magnus Carlsen referenced it during the Carlsen–Niemann controversy, claiming that Dlugy had previously served as a coach of Hans Niemann. Later, Vice published an article where Chess.com released e-mails showing that Dlugy had confessed to cheating multiple times on Chess.com and had to be banned entirely from all events with cash prizes. On October 10, 2022, Dlugy made a lengthy statement denying that he had done any actual cheating, defending Niemann, and denying any involvement with Niemann's game.

== Personal life ==
Dlugy worked on Wall Street. He became a principal of the Russian Growth Fund, a hedge fund. Former world chess champion Garry Kasparov was formerly associated with Dlugy's Russian Growth Fund. Dlugy was imprisoned in Russia in April 2005 on charges of embezzlement but was acquitted and freed later that year.
