= Chess.com =

Internet chess server

Chess.com, LLC

- Chess.com homepage
- Company type: Internet chess server
- Website type: Internet chess server
- Available in: 57 languages
- List of languages Afrikaans, Albanian, Arabic, Armenian, Azerbaijani, Bengali, Belarusian, Bosnian, Bulgarian, Catalan, Chinese, Chinese (Hong Kong), Chinese (Taiwan), Croatian, Czech, Danish, Dutch, English, Estonian, Filipino, Finnish, Flemish, French, Galician, Georgian, German, Greek, Hebrew, Hindi, Hungarian, Icelandic, Indonesian, Italian, Japanese, Korean, Latvian, Lithuanian, Malay, Norwegian, Persian, Polish, Portuguese, Portuguese (Brazil), Romanian, Russian, Serbian, Slovak, Slovenian, Spanish, Swahili, Swedish, Tagalog, Turkish, Turkmen, Ukrainian, Uzbek, Vietnamese
- Founded: May 2007; 19 years ago
- Headquarters: United States
- Founders: Erik Allebest; Jay Severson
- CEO: Erik Allebest
- Key people: Jay Severson (Chief Technical Advisor); Daniel Rensch (Chief Chess Officer); Brenan Klain (Chief Marketing Officer)
- Industry: Online game
- Employees: 650+
- Subsidiaries: ChessKid.com; Play Magnus Group
- Website: www.chess.com
- Advertising: Displayed to anonymous users and free account-holders only; paying account-holders are not shown ads
- Commercial: Yes
- Registration: Optional
- Users: 250 million+
- Current status: Active
- Written in: Java; JavaScript; PHP

Chess.com is an internet chess server. The largest chess platform in the world, the site operates on a freemium model in which some features are available for free, and others are available with a subscription. Users can play live online chess against other users in daily, rapid, blitz, or bullet time controls, with a number of chess variants available. Additionally, the platform offers play against chess engines, computer analysis, chess puzzles, and teaching resources.

According to Chess.com, they reached 250 million members around February 27, 2026, and had about 11 million daily active users as of April 2023. Chess.com has hosted online tournaments, including Titled Tuesdays, the PRO Chess League, the Speed Chess Championships, PogChamps, Online Chess Olympiads, and computer vs computer events. The site has 292.5 million members as of November 19, 2026.

== History ==
=== Founding ===
The domain Chess.com was set up in 1995 by Aficionado, a company based in Berkeley, California, to sell Chess Mentor, a chess-tutoring app. In 2005, Internet entrepreneur Erik Allebest and partner Jarom "Jay" Severson, who met as undergraduate students at Brigham Young University, bought the domain name, and Aficionado moved to chessmentor.com. Erik and Jay assembled a team of software developers to redevelop the site as a chess portal. The site was relaunched in 2007 with heavy campaigning and promotion on social media.

Two years later, Chess.com acquired a similar chess social networking site, chesspark.com. In October 2013, it acquired the Amsterdam-based website chessvibes.com, a chess news site founded and operated by Dutch chess journalist Peter Doggers. Chessvibes continued to cover chess tournaments in a digital setting.

=== Growth in the 2010s ===
In 2014, the site announced that over a billion live games had been played on the site, including 100 million correspondence games. In January 2016, Chess.com announced a two-year overhaul of its "v3" interface. The site introduced features including computer analysis of games, and the chess variants crazyhouse, three-check chess, king of the hill, chess960, atomic and bughouse. In June 2017, the 2,147,483,647th (2^{31}-1) game was played. This caused the app to stop working on 32-bit Apple iOS devices because the number was too large to be represented in device storage.

In May 2018, Chess.com acquired the commercial chess engine Komodo, which held an Elo rating of 3300+, third behind Stockfish and Houdini. The Komodo team also announced the addition of the probabilistic method of Monte Carlo tree search machine learning, the same methods used by the recent chess projects AlphaZero and Leela Chess Zero.

In November 2020, Chess.com acquired the rights to broadcast the World Chess Championship 2021, which is broadcast on live-streaming platform Twitch.

=== Response to the Russian invasion of Ukraine ===
In response to the 2022 Russian invasion of Ukraine, Chess.com published two articles that were critical of the invasion and replaced Russian and Belarusian flags with grey flags that linked to these articles. In retaliation, Chess.com was blocked in Russia. The site blocked Sergey Karjakin, Russian (formerly Ukrainian) grandmaster, over his support for the invasion, and Karjakin in turn supported Russia's block of the website.

=== Chess cheating controversy ===
In September 2022, Chess.com was involved in a controversy regarding cheating in professional chess games. A controversy erupted with accusations by grandmaster Magnus Carlsen against grandmaster Hans Niemann. Chess.com banned Niemann from their site after he defeated Carlsen at the Sinquefield Cup. Chess.com leaked their email correspondence with grandmaster Maxim Dlugy whose account had been closed by Chess.com after they had been flagged for fair play violations. In August 2023, a US District Court judge dismissed the lawsuit filed by Hans Niemann. In the same month, Chess.com settled with Niemann, agreeing to reinstate him on the platform.

=== Chess.com Global Championship ===
In November 2022, the Chess.com Global Championship was inaugurated with a $1,000,000 prize pool. Eight players that advanced from the CGC Knockout competed for a $500,000 total prize fund and Global Champion title in the finals taking place in Toronto, Canada. Wesley So became the first Chess.com Global Champion, defeating Nihal Sarin in the finals with a match score of 4.5–1.5.

Torch
- Original authors: Finn Eggers, Andrew Grant, Jay Honnold, Kim Kåhre, Dietrich Kappe, Michael Whiteley
- Developer: Chess.com
- Type: Chess engine
- Website: www.chess.com

=== Torch ===
Torch is a closed-source chess engine created by Chess.com. Torch has finished second in several Chess.com Computer Chess Championship events, only behind Stockfish in each case.

The team behind Torch is composed of Andrew Grant (author of Ethereal), Finn Eggers and Kim Kåhre (authors of Koivisto), Jay Honnold (author of Berserk), and Michael Whiteley and Dietrich Kappe (current authors of Dragon). The former authors of Dragon, Mark Lefler and Larry Kaufman, are advisors on this project. The development of Torch is supported by many open-source tools, including pytorch-nnue, Cutechess, and OpenBench. Torch developers have stated that the entire source code of Torch is original, with no code being used from any other engine.

On June 19, 2024, Andrew Grant announced the focus of future Torch development as Chess.com power tool instead of Elo strength.

== Subsidiary companies ==
=== ChessKid.com ===
Chess.com runs the subsidiary site ChessKid.com, intended primarily for chess players under the age of 13.

ChessKid.com has run a yearly online championship called CONIC (the ChessKid Online National Invitational Championship), since 2012 which is recognized by the United States Chess Federation. According to David Petty, the event organizer in 2013, ChessKid has made agreements and partnerships with chess associations in schools. They have a long-term partnership with the NTCA (North Texas Chess Academy) which gives children access to online instructors.

=== Play Magnus Group ===
In August 2022, the Play Magnus Group accepted an offer to be acquired by Chess.com at a value of 800 million Norwegian krone (US$80,000,000 at the time). The Play Magnus Group owns brands and businesses including the chess server chess24, the mobile app Play Magnus, the Champions Chess Tour, and the chess improvement website Chessable. On December 16, 2022, the acquisition was officially closed. According to Dot Esports, the Play Magnus Group was unable to make a "sustainable profit" on anything but Chessable, and the merge left "no other realistic chess competitor" except the free, open-source website Lichess.

== Tournaments and events ==
=== Speed Chess Championship ===
Chess.com has held the Speed Chess Championship annually since 2016, involving a single-elimination tournament featuring some of the world's best players including Magnus Carlsen and Hikaru Nakamura who have both won five championships.

==== Tournament formula ====
The most important elements of the tournament formula are

- 16-player single-elimination bracket
- Matches of three segments: 90 minutes of 5+1, 60 minutes of 3+1, and 30 minutes of 1+1.
- The player with the most cumulative points at the end of the match wins.
- Games that start before the time for a segment runs out count toward the final score.
- Players can resign from the match within the last 10 minutes of the 1+1 segment, with the player's win percentage being capped at 35%.
- In case of equal number of points – tiebreaks:
  - A four-game 1+1 match.
  - A single bidding armageddon game with a base time of 5 minutes.

==== Winners of Speed Chess Championships ====
No	Year	Winner	Runner-up	Final score	Prize fund
1	2016	NOR Magnus Carlsen	USA Hikaru Nakamura	14.5–10.5	$40,000
2	2017	NOR Magnus Carlsen	USA Hikaru Nakamura	18–9	$50,000
3	2018	USA Hikaru Nakamura	USA Wesley So	15.5–12.5	$55,000
4	2019	USA Hikaru Nakamura	USA Wesley So	19.5–14.5	$50,000
5	2020	USA Hikaru Nakamura	FRA Maxime Vachier-Lagrave	18.5–12.5	$100,000
6	2021	USA Hikaru Nakamura	USA Wesley So	23–8	$100,000
7	2022	USA Hikaru Nakamura	NOR Magnus Carlsen	14.5–13.5	$100,000
8	2023	NOR Magnus Carlsen	USA Hikaru Nakamura	13.5–12.5	$150,000
9	2024	NOR Magnus Carlsen	FRA Alireza Firouzja	23.5–7.5	$175,000
10	2025	NOR Magnus Carlsen	FRA Alireza Firouzja	15–12	$250,000

=== Daily Chess Championships ===
==== Tournament formula ====
The tournament starts on January 1 and depending on the number of participants, consists of 4 or 5 rounds. (Note: Since 2020, due to the steadily growing number of players, a 5-round format is necessary.) All players are divided into groups (up to 12 people (Note: If the number of all players in a given round is not divisible by 12, smaller groups are created. In case all groups cannot be of the same size, players with the highest rankings go to smaller groups.)), and only the winners advance to the next round. (Note: In case of equal points, all winners in the group advance.) Players play in each round a maximum of 22 games simultaneously (with each opponent as White and Black), with a maximum of one day allocated for each move. It can therefore be considered a form of correspondence chess. The winner of the Championship is the player who accumulates the most points in the final round.

==== Winners of Daily Chess Championships ====
No	Year	Gold	Silver	Bronze	Number of players
1	2018	ARG Sergio German	USA Robert King	RUS Alexey Zimin	7344
2	2019	GER Sascha Grimm	ARG Sergio German	NED Daan Brandenburg	11609
3	2020	DEN Uffe Vinther-Schou	RUS Andrei Belozerov	TUR Irmak Sipahioglu	16831
4	2021	DEN Uffe Vinther-Schou	RUS Andrei Belozerov	UKR Leonid Starozhilov; POL Marcin Szymański	16505
5	2022	USA Ethan Hunt	RUS Andrei Belozerov	USA Chris L Chambers	33633
6	2023	POL Marcin Szymański	RUS DanilinDP	POL Kacper Drozdowski	35000
7	2024	INA patzers	UKR Yury Galichin	USA Schadenfreude5	60466
8	2025	JAP Tran Thanh Tu	BEL Richard Polaczek	UKR Yury Galichin; USA Greg Shahade; UKR Leonid Starozhilov; POL Marcin Szymański	24760
9	2026	???	???	???	55394
Italic font - only usernames available on the chess.com platform.

=== PRO Chess League ===
==== Winners of PRO Chess League ====
No	Year	Winner	Runner-up	Final score
1	2017	St. Louis Arch Bishops	Norway Gnomes	9–7
2	2018	Armenia Eagles	Chengdu Pandas	12–11
3	2019	St. Louis Arch Bishops	Baden-Baden Snowballs	10–6
4	2020	St. Louis Arch Bishops	Canada Chessbrahs/Chengde Panda	9.5-6.5
5	2021	Russia Wizards	St. Louis Arch Bishops	9–7
6	2023	Gotham Knights	Shanghai Tigers	9.5-6.5

=== Titled Tuesday ===
Titled Tuesday is an 11-round Swiss-system blitz chess tournament held every Tuesday, where all entrants must have a FIDE or national master title and their full legal name registered on their Chess.com account. The event started as a monthly 9 round tournament. The first edition was held on October 28, 2014 with a total prize fund of $1,000, including $500 for first place, which was won by Baadur Jobava. It became a weekly event on April 7, 2020 and permanently became 11 rounds on October 20, 2020. On February 1, 2022, the prize fund increased from $1600 to $2500, with $1000 for first place. Two events were also to be held every week instead of one.

In June 2018, Chess.com held a special version of the tournament for which the winner would go on to participate in the Isle of Man International which had a prize fund of £144,000. Iranian GM Pouria Darini won the event.

By August 28, 2024, Hikaru Nakamura had the most tournament wins since October 2020 with 77, followed by Magnus Carlsen with 20 wins, and Dmitry Andreikin with 17 wins. Other super grandmaster winners include Maxime Vachier-Lagrave, Alexander Grischuk, Alireza Firouzja, Wesley So, Ian Nepomniachtchi, and Fabiano Caruana.

Until September 2025, games played were of the 3+1 format, meaning 3 minutes per player, with a 1-second increment—to be added each turn. Since 2 September 2025, the time control format was changed to 5+0, and the prize fund increased to a total of $3,000—with 1st, 2nd and 3rd place receiving $1,000, $750 and $350 respectively. In addition to the stand-alone "Top Woman" prize, the "Top 3 Streamers" category was added, with $100 each in additional weekly prizes. Among other changes made in September 2025 was the roll-out of Proctor, Chess.com's "fair play" anti-cheat software. Proctor would become a requirement for all players competing in prized events. Titled Tuesday was also announced to become a qualifying pathway to the 2026 Esports World Cup, and to be partnering with chess media start-up Take Take Take.

In 2025, the After Party and Untitled After Party were both added to the weekly roster of Tuesday events, with untitled players now also able to compete for a cash prize. Scheduled two hours after Titled Tuesday, these would be arena-style tournaments, last for two hours and feature a 3+0 game format. Their introduction aimed to provide new opportunities for untitled players and to encourage more broadcasting of Chess.com events through live-streaming platforms. An additional $1,500 was made available for 7 titled players and streamers, $500 for the top 3 untitled players (streaming being a pre-requisite) and $100 for the "Top Woman". This increase in funding brought the weekly prize total for all Tuesday events to $5,000.

=== Other recurring events ===
Beyond Titled Tuesday, Chess.com hosts several other weekly prize events for titled and qualified players. These include Bullet Brawl, a two-hour 1+0 arena held on Saturdays; 3 0 Thursday, an 11-round 3+0 blitz Swiss tournament; and Freestyle Friday, a weekly Chess960 tournament whose leaderboard serves as a qualifier for the FIDE Freestyle Chess World Championship.

=== Death Matches ===
Death Matches were introduced in January 2012. They feature titled players taking part in a series of blitz games over a non-stop 3-hour period (5-minute, 3-minute and 1-minute, all with a one-second increment). There have been 38 deathmatches, participants including the grandmasters Hikaru Nakamura, Dmitry Andreikin, Maxime Vachier-Lagrave, Lê Quang Liêm, Wesley So, Fabiano Caruana, Judit Polgár and Nigel Short.

=== Chess.com Computer Chess Championship ===
In November 2017, Chess.com held an open tournament, called the Chess.com Computer Chess Championship (CCCC, later CCC), with the ten strongest chess engines, with $2,500 in prize money. The top-two engines competed in a "Superfinal" tournament between the two finalists – Stockfish and Houdini. In the 20-game Superfinal, Stockfish won over Houdini with a score 10.5–9.5. Five games were decisive, with 15 ending in a draw. Of the decisive games, three games were won by Stockfish, and two by Houdini.

In August 2018, the site announced that the Chess.com Computer Chess Championship had returned, this time as a non-stop tournament for chess engines.

Main events
Event	Year	Time controls	Winner	Runner-up	Ref
Computer Chess Championship	2017	15+2	Stockfish (1)	Houdini	
CCC 1: Rapid Rumble	2018	15+5	Stockfish (2)	Houdini	
CCC 2: Blitz Battle	2018	5+2	Stockfish (3)	Komodo	
CCC 3: Rapid Redux	2019	30+5	Stockfish (4)	Leela Chess Zero	
CCC 4: Bullet Brawl	2019	1+2	Stockfish (5)	Leela Chess Zero	
CCC 5: Escalation	2019	10+5	Stockfish (6)	Leela Chess Zero	
CCC 6: Winter Classic	2019	10+10	Stockfish (7)	Leela Chess Zero	
CCC 7: Blitz Bonanza	2019	5+2	Leela Chess Zero (1)	Stockfish	
CCC 8: Deep Dive	2019	15+5	Stockfish (8)	Leela Chess Zero	
CCC 9: The Gauntlet	2019	5+2, 10+5	Stockfish (9)	Leelenstein	
CCC 10: Double Digits	2019	10+3	Leelenstein (1)	Stockfish	
CCC 11	2019	30+5	Leela Chess Zero (2)	Stockfish	
CCC 12: Bullet Madness!	2020	1+1	Leela Chess Zero (3)	Leelenstein	
CCC 13: Heptagonal	2020	5+5	Leela Chess Zero (4)	Stockfish	
CCC 14	2020	15+5, 5+2, 1+1	Leela Chess Zero (5)	Leelenstein	
CCC Blitz 2020	2020	5+5	Stockfish (10)	Leela Chess Zero	
CCC Rapid 2021	2021	15+3	Stockfish (11)	Leela Chess Zero	
CCC Blitz 2021	2021	5+5	Stockfish (12)	Leela Chess Zero	
CCC Chess 960 Blitz	2021	5+5	Stockfish (13)	Dragon	
CCC 16: Rapid	2021	15+3	Stockfish (14)	Leela Chess Zero	
CCC 16: Bullet	2021	2+1	Stockfish (15)	Dragon	
CCC 16: Blitz	2022	5+5	Stockfish (16)	Dragon	
CCC 17: Rapid	2022	15+3	Stockfish (17)	Dragon	
CCC 17: Bullet	2022	2+1	Stockfish (18)	Dragon	
CCC 17: Blitz	2022	5+5	Stockfish (19)	Leela Chess Zero	
CCC 18: Rapid	2022	15+3	Stockfish (20)	Leela Chess Zero	
CCC 19: Blitz	2022	5+5	Stockfish (21)	Dragon	
CCC 19: Rapid	2022	15+3	Stockfish (22)	Leela Chess Zero	
CCC 19: Bullet	2023	1+1	Stockfish (23)	Dragon	
CCC 20: Blitz	2023	3+2	Stockfish (24)	Dragon	
CCC 20: Rapid	2023	10+3	Stockfish (25)	Leela Chess Zero	
CCC 20: Bullet	2023	1+1	Stockfish (26)	Torch	
CCC 21: Blitz	2023	3+2	Stockfish (27)	Torch	
CCC 21: Rapid	2023	10+3	Stockfish (28)	Leela Chess Zero	
CCC 21: Bullet	2023	1+1	Stockfish (29)	Torch	
CCC 22: Blitz	2024	3+2	Stockfish (30)	Torch	
CCC 22: Rapid	2024	10+3	Stockfish (31)	Leela Chess Zero	
CCC 22: Bullet	2024	1+1	Stockfish (32)	Torch	
CCC 23: Blitz	2024	3+2	Stockfish (33)	Torch	
CCC 23: Rapid	2024	10+3	Stockfish (34)	Leela Chess Zero	
CCC 23: Bullet	2024	1+1	Stockfish (35)	Torch	
CCC 24: Blitz	2024	3+2	Stockfish (36)	Torch	
CCC 24: Rapid	2025	10+3	Stockfish (37)	Leela Chess Zero	
CCC 24: Bullet	2025	1+1	Stockfish (38)	Torch	
CCC 25: Blitz	2025	3+2	Stockfish (39)	Torch	
CCC 25: Rapid	2025	10+3	Stockfish (40)	Torch	
CCC 25: Bullet	2026	1+1	Stockfish (41)	Torch	

Bonus
Event	Year	Time Controls	Winner	Runner-up	Ref
CPU Blitz Madness	2020	3+2	Stockfish	an older version of Stockfish	
Trillion-Node Throwdown III	2020	150+5	Stockfish	Leela Chess Zero on the CPU	
No-Castle II	2020	5+2	Stockfish	an older version of Stockfish	
Bullet Chess is Fun	2020	2+1	Stockfish	Leela Chess Zero	
Checkmate in 4	2020	3+2	Stockfish	Leela Chess Zero	
Odds Ladder	2020	3+2	Stockfish	Leela Chess Zero	
Merry Queen Sac	2020	2+1	Stockfish	Stoofvlees	
Budapest Bullet	2020	2+1	Leela Chess Zero	Stockfish	
King Gambit Madness	2021	5+5	Stockfish	Leela Chess Zero	
Drawkiller Update Party	2021	2+1	Stockfish	Leela Chess Zero	
To Castle Or Not To Castle II	2021	3+2	Stockfish	Leela Chess Zero	
Eco Mega-Match 2 (part 1)	2021	1+1	Stockfish	Leela Chess Zero	
Eco Mega-Match 2 (part 2)	2021	1+1	Stockfish	Leela Chess Zero	
Caro-Kann Special	2021	5+2	Stockfish	Leela Chess Zero	
King's Indian Defense Special	2021	10+2	Leela Chess Zero	Stockfish	
Dutch Defense Special	2021	10+2	Stockfish	Leela Chess Zero	
Evans Gambit Madness	2021	10+2	Leela Chess Zero	Stockfish	
Sicilian Najdorf Special	2021	10+2	Stockfish	Dragon	
Belgian Stew	2021	2+1	Stockfish	Leela Chess Zero	
Saragossa	2021	2+1	Leela Chess Zero	Stockfish	
Double Bongcloud, Rapid	2021	10+2	Leela Chess Zero	Stockfish	
The Hillbilly Attack	2021	10+2	Leela Chess Zero	Dragon	
Romantic Openings: Danish Gambit Accepted	2021	3+2	Stockfish	Dragon	
Romantic Openings: Evans Gambit Accepted	2021	3+2	Stockfish	Leela Chess Zero	
Romantic Openings: Urusov Gambit Accepted	2021	5+2	Stockfish	Dragon	
Romantic Openings: Blackmar-Diemer Gambit	2021	5+2	Stockfish	Dragon	
Romantic Openings: Stafford Gambit	2021	1+2	Leela Chess Zero	Stockfish	
Romantic Openings: Calabrese Countergambit	2021	5+2	Stockfish	Leela Chess Zero	
Romantic Openings: Traxler Counterattack	2021	5+2	Leela Chess Zero	Stockfish	
No Black Castling	2022	5+5	Stockfish	Dragon	
Draw Killer	2022	15+5	Stockfish	Leela Chess Zero	
Romantic Openings: Wing Gambit	2022	5+2	Stockfish	Leela Chess Zero	
Chess 324 Bonus	2022	5+2	Stockfish	Dragon	
Classical Cup #1	2023	30+5	Stockfish	Leela Chess Zero	
Rating Brawl: Fall 2023	2023	1+1	Stockfish	Torch	

=== PogChamps ===
Chess.com has hosted PogChamps, an amateur online tournament featuring Twitch streamers, since 2020. The first PogChamps featured streamers including xQcOW, MoistCr1TiKaL, Ludwig Ahgren, and forsen. New participants from PogChamps 2 included itsHafu and Hafþór Júlíus Björnsson. PogChamps 3, beginning in February 2021, debuted with a wider range of Internet personalities and celebrities, with new competitors including MrBeast, Neekolul, Myth, Pokimane, actor Rainn Wilson, and rapper Logic.

=== Coaches ===
Chess.com provides an extensive feature for connecting with professional chess coaches. Users can search for coaches at Chess.com Coaches Club based on rating, language, and availability, and view detailed profiles that include teaching styles, experience, and rates. Coaches include José Eduardo Martínez Alcántara, Raunak Sadhwani, and Benjamin Bok.

=== Peak ratings ===
Online ratings on Chess.com exhibit internal disparities across different time controls. While Blitz and Rapid peak ratings are heavily dominated by established grandmasters and closely mirror over-the-board playing strength, Bullet ratings—particularly those achieved by untitled online specialists—frequently draw skepticism within the chess community. This discrepancy is largely attributed to the influence of ultra-fast variants (such as hyperbullet), heavy reliance on premoving mechanics, and specialized online habits, which can occasionally result in rating inflation or fair play controversies.

The highest recorded peak ratings achieved on the platform across major live time controls include:

Top 3 highest peak ratings achieved on Chess.com by time control
Time control	Player	Username	Peak rating	Ref. / Notes
Blitz	(United States) Hikaru Nakamura	Hikaru	3503	
Blitz	(United States) Andy Woodward	Philippians46	3440	
Blitz	(Norway) Magnus Carlsen	MagnusCarlsen	3421	
Bullet	(United States) Andy Woodward	Philippians46	3662	
Bullet	(Russia) Arkadiy Khromaev	ArkadiiKhromaev	3602	Active account; previously subject to account closures and fair play bans
Bullet	(United States) Hikaru Nakamura	Hikaru	3570	
Rapid	(Poland) Jan-Krzysztof Duda	Polish_fighter3000	2997	
Rapid	(Norway) Magnus Carlsen	MagnusCarlsen	2977	
Rapid	(Russia) Andrey Gutov	GutovAndrey	2944	

== See also ==
- List of Internet chess platforms

- Internet Chess Club

- Top Chess Engine Championship
