= Jan Gustafsson =

German chess grandmaster (born 1979)

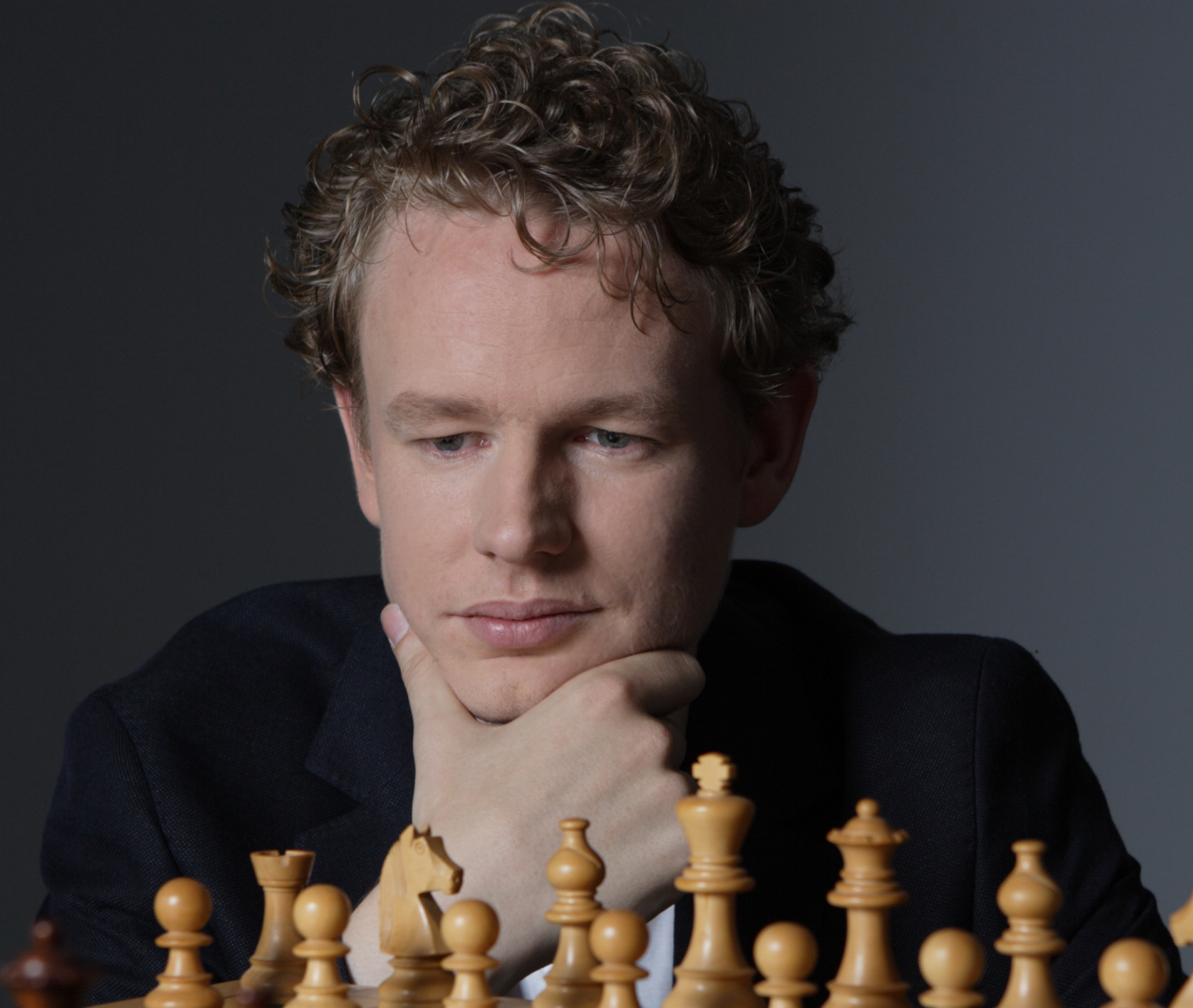
- Gustafsson in 2007

Personal information
- Born: 25 June 1979 (age 47) Hamburg, West Germany

Chess career
- Country: Germany
- Title: Grandmaster (2003)
- FIDE rating: 2580 (July 2026)
- Peak rating: 2652 (November 2010)
- Peak ranking: No. 85 (April 2005)

Jan Gustafsson (born 25 June 1979) is a German chess player, analyst and trainer. He was awarded the title Grandmaster by FIDE in 2003. He co-founded the Chess24.com website, for which he frequently appeared as a broadcaster and commentator.

== Biography ==
Gustafsson was born in Hamburg. His parents took a break from their careers when he was a child to spend a few years sailing in the Mediterranean Sea, and Gustafsson started playing chess in this setting as there were few other sports that were playable on a boat. The family then lived in Spain before returning to Hamburg, where Gustafsson played in the local chess club. He soon became a strong player and was part of the team that won the U13 German Team Championship in 1992. Two years later, he won the U15 German Chess Championship, and in 1996 he won both the U17 Championship and the U20 Team Championship.

Gustafsson was granted the title of International Master in 1999 and that of Grandmaster in 2003. He is one of the strongest German players; he finished second in the 2004 and 2005 German championships, and won the German championship of blitz chess in 2001. He was nominated to the German national chess team in 2002, represented his nation at the 36th, 37th, 38th and 40th Chess Olympiads, and was part of the German team that won the 2011 European Team Chess Championship.

In April 2011, he tied for 1st–3rd places with Nigel Short and Francisco Vallejo Pons in the Thailand Open in Bangkok and won the event on tiebreak. In April 2019, Gustafsson won this tournament for the second time, on tiebreak over Deep Sengupta, each having scored 7/9 points.

Gustafsson was involved in the Chess24.com project, for which he was a host and analyst; the chess historian, Edward Winter, named him as one of the top five Internet chess broadcasters. He is also a poker player and in 2007 co-authored a book on poker together with Dutch professional poker player, Marcel Lüske.

Gustafsson is an expert in opening theory, and was part of Magnus Carlsen's team for the 2016 World Championship against Sergey Karjakin, the 2018 World Championship against Fabiano Caruana, and the 2021 World Championship against Ian Nepomniachtchi. He also is the coach of the German National Chess team. In 2018, he was awarded the title of FIDE Senior Trainer.

In April 2024, Gustafsson served as a second for Nepomniachtchi at the 2024 Candidates Tournament.
