= TCEC Season 14 =

14th season of the Top Chess Engine Championship

TCEC Grand Champion	Runner-up
Stockfish	Leela Chess Zero
50.5 (10)	49.5 (9)
← TCEC Season 13	TCEC Season 15 →

The 14th season of the Top Chess Engine Championship took place between 17 November 2018 and 24 February 2019. Stockfish was the defending champion, having defeated Komodo in the previous season's superfinal.

The season is notable for two things: the emergence of two strong, new engines, the Komodo variant Komodo Monte Carlo tree search (MCTS) and the neural network engine Leela Chess Zero, and the dramatic superfinal. Komodo MCTS and Leela fought their way from Division 4 and Division 3 respectively to the Premier Division, with Leela further qualifying for the superfinal against Stockfish. The superfinal was a topsy-turvy affair with the lead changing hands several times. It finished as the closest superfinal TCEC has ever seen, with Stockfish winning by a single game, 50.5–49.5 (+10 =81 -9).

== Overview ==
=== Structure ===
The season comprised five divisions: from the lowest Division 4 to the Premier Division. The top two engines of each division promote to the division above, while the bottom two engines relegate. The top two engines of the Premier Division contest a 100-game superfinal. The lengths of the opening books used increases as the divisions progress. The superfinal itself used a custom opening book designed by Jeroen Noomen.

=== Rules ===
The TCEC draw and win rules were slightly modified for Season 14. The game is now adjudicated as drawn if, after move 30, both engines have evals ±0.08 for five consecutive moves, and there are neither pawn moves nor a capture. Win adjudication now occurs if both engines have an eval of ±10 for five consecutive moves.

Following the controversy over DeusX's participation last season, the uniqueness rule for neural networks was modified such that at least two of the following three hallmarks must be unique:

1. The code for training the neural network
2. The neural network (and weights file) itself
3. The engine that executes this network

This change meant DeusX did not meet the uniqueness criteria and therefore did not participate. Aside from this change, the season used the standard rules of the TCEC.

== Results ==
=== Division 4 ===
New entrant Komodo MCTS dominated Division 4, winning by a clear four points, although it did lose a game to second-place finisher rofChade. Fellow new entrant Scorpio NN performed badly and finished last, drawing only one game and losing the rest.

Pos	Engine	Pld	W	D	L	Pts	Qualification
1	KomodoMCTS	44	32	11	1	37.5	Advance to Division 3
2	rofChade	44	24	17	3	32.5	Advance to Division 3
3	Nemorino	44	23	14	7	30	Advance to Division 3
4	Schooner	44	17	22	5	28	
5	pirarucu	44	15	19	10	24.5	
6	Wasp	44	15	19	10	24.5	
7	Demolito	44	14	18	12	23	
8	Tucano	44	10	16	18	18	
9	Rodent	44	10	15	19	17.5	
10	chess22k	44	9	16	19	17	
11	Winter	44	5	12	27	11	
12	ScorpioNN	44	0	1	43	0.5	

=== Division 3 ===
The neural network engine Leela Chess Zero had just missed promotion to Division 2 in the previous season. Since its relatively weak performance last season was partly due to hardware problems, and since it had shown a lot of improvement in strength, it was the hot favourite in this division. Leela lived up to its billing by comprehensively defeating everyone else. In a portent of future divisions however, Leela surprisingly dropped a game to third-place Arasan. Komodo MCTS was also improving quickly, and an updated version finished second behind Leela. The gap between second and third was 6.5 points, illustrating the gulf in class.

Pos	Engine	Pld	W	D	L	Pts	Qualification
1	LCZero	28	18	9	1	22.5	Advance to Division 2
2	KomodoMCTS	28	14	12	2	20	Advance to Division 2
3	Pedone	28	8	11	9	13.5	
4	Arasan	28	5	17	6	13.5	
5	Vajolet2	28	5	15	8	12.5	
6	rofChade	28	5	15	8	12.5	
7	Nemorino	28	5	13	10	11.5	Relegate to Division 4
8	Hannibal	28	1	10	17	6	Relegate to Division 4

=== Division 2 ===
Although Division 2 engines are significantly stronger than Division 3, Leela and Komodo MCTS continued to dominate the competition, and again finished first and second. Komodo MCTS only lost one game to Leela, while Leela's tendency to occasionally lose to weaker engines saw her losing a game to 4th-placed Booot. Third place finisher Xiphos gave Leela and Komodo MCTS a run for their money, and was in the running up until the final rounds when it lost a crucial game to Leela. This loss left it one point behind Komodo MCTS in the final standings.

Pos	Engine	Pld	W	D	L	Pts	Qualification
1	LCZero	28	13	14	1	20	Advance to Division 1
2	KomodoMCTS	28	7	20	1	17	Advance to Division 1
3	Xiphos	28	6	20	2	16	
4	Booot	28	4	20	4	14	
5	Nirvana	28	4	18	6	13	
6	ChessBrainVB	28	4	16	8	12	
7	Gull	28	5	13	10	11.5	Relegate to Division 3
8	Texel	28	1	15	12	8.5	Relegate to Division 3

=== Division 1 ===
Leela and Komodo MCTS's rampage through the lower divisions continued, and they again finished first and second. In a demonstration of how much it had improved, Leela scored 20/28 in this division, the same score it had achieved in Division 2. This was also a TCEC points record for this division. However, Leela dropped a game against fourth-place finisher Chiron. Komodo MCTS, which had yet to lose a game in the lower divisions except to Leela, also conceded its first loss to third-place Fizbo. At the other end of the table, former champions Jonny and Fritz, which had not been updated, found themselves outclassed and finished second-last and last respectively; however with fellow competitor Ginkgo crashing five times (and therefore being disqualified), Jonny managed to stay in the division.

The penultimate game for this division set a new TCEC moves record for a decisive game: 308 moves before Leela defeated Fritz.

Pos	Engine	Pld	W	D	L	Pts	Qualification
1	LCZero	28	13	14	1	20	Advance to Premier Division
2	KomodoMCTS	28	8	19	1	17.5	Advance to Premier Division
3	Fizbo	28	6	17	5	14.5	
4	Chiron	28	6	15	7	13.5	
5	Ginkgo (D)	28	6	15	7	13.5	Relegate to Division 2
6	Laser	28	3	20	5	13	
7	Jonny	28	3	18	7	12	
8	Fritz	28	0	16	12	8	Relegate to Division 2

(D) Disqualified

=== Premier division ===
Stockfish-Leela Chess Zero

Position: a8 black rook, d8 black queen, e8 black king, f8 black rook, b7 black bishop, d7 black knight, e7 black bishop, g7 black pawn, h7 black pawn, a6 black pawn, b6 black pawn, d6 white bishop, e6 white queen, a4 white pawn, c4 white pawn, g4 white pawn, e2 white bishop, f2 white pawn, h2 white pawn, a1 white rook, d1 white rook, g1 white king

White to move. Black is clearly under pressure, and as later analysis showed, 22. c5! wins. Stockfish played 22. g5, which was still tricky but not decisive. Leela defended well and drew, qualifying for the superfinal.

This was the strongest premier division ever, with multiple-time champions Stockfish, Komodo, and Houdini in the mix. Right from the start it became clear that Stockfish was in a league of its own, and it dominated the division, scoring wins against every other engine without losing a game. Second place however was a hotly-contested affair, with Leela, Komodo and Houdini neck-and-neck for most of the division. Houdini took the early lead, but Komodo gained second after winning two games by forfeit when its sibling Komodo MCTS crashed. This led to murmurs of a "Konspiracy". However, when both Komodo and Houdini failed to score more wins against the lower half of the field, Leela was able to take the lead. Halfway through the division the race was upended again when Leela went through a bad streak, losing three games in a row to Stockfish, Komodo, and Fire. This led to Komodo regaining second place, only for Komodo MCTS to crash yet again. By TCEC rules this meant Komodo MCTS was disqualified and all its scores were zeroed out, which put Leela back in second place. With three games left, Leela missed a win against Andscacs, which would've more or less secured her a place in the superfinal. Meanwhile, Komodo kept the division interesting by winning two of its last three games. Because Komodo had superior tiebreakers to Leela, this meant Komodo would qualify for the superfinal unless Leela managed to hold Stockfish to a draw with Black in the last game of the division. In a tense final game, Stockfish came close to winning, but missed the winning line. Leela managed to draw and qualified for the superfinal.

At the other end of the table, it was quickly apparent that Ethereal and Andscacs were the weakest engines and would likely relegate. However, when Komodo MCTS was disqualified (and therefore relegated), it threw both engines a lifeline, since they could now stay in the division by beating the other. Andscacs was able to score a head-to-head win against Ethereal, but was crushed by Stockfish (+0 =2 -4) and Leela (+0 =3 -3). Ethereal didn't manage to score a win in the entire division, but did manage to score more draws than Andscacs, condemning Andscacs to relegation.

Pos	Engine	Pld	W	D	L	Pts	Qualification
1	Stockfish	42	16	26	0	29	Advance to Superfinal
2	LCZero	42	9	30	3	24	Advance to Superfinal
3	Komodo	42	9	30	3	24	
4	Houdini	42	7	33	2	23.5	
5	Fire	42	2	31	9	17.5	
6	KomodoMCTS (D)	42	4	27	11	17.5	Relegate to Division 1
7	Andscacs	42	2	29	11	16.5	Relegate to Division 1
8	Ethereal	42	0	32	10	16	

(D) Disqualified

=== Superfinal ===
Leela Chess Zero-Stockfish, game 65

Position: c7 black bishop, e7 black king, c5 black pawn, d5 white pawn, c4 white pawn, g4 white knight, f3 white king

Black to move. This position is a tablebase win. Stockfish saw the win and was returning +153 evals, but Leela did not, and the game was drawn by the 50-move rule.

Going into the superfinal expectations were high for Leela: she had received a new network and had just won her first major competition when she defeated Houdini in the second TCEC cup. However, she had won the tournament without having played Stockfish (who had been surprisingly eliminated by Houdini in the semifinals). That, plus the fact that Stockfish dominated Premier Division and had never lost a match to Leela, left it unclear which engine was superior, although most spectators favored Stockfish.

The superfinal turned out to be a roller-coaster. It began with Stockfish drawing first blood in game 7, and then scoring another win in game 10. Leela hit back with wins in game 11 and 13, but then lost games 20, 21, and 22. This gave Stockfish a 3-point lead. However, in the next 30 games, Leela was the only one to score wins: it first equalized by winning games 25, 27, and 29, and then took the lead by winning games 49 and 53. Stockfish won game 56, but Leela won game 63, maintaining her lead.

There followed two dramatic games. In game 65, Leela built up a winning position. Stockfish showed a +153 evaluation, indicating that it had found a forced line leading to an endgame tablebase win; indeed analysis with 7-piece tablebases showed that Leela's position was winning. Under previous seasons' rules, the game would have been adjudicated as a win because Leela's evaluation was above 6.5. However under the new rules, Leela's +8.92 evaluation was not enough to adjudicate. It turned out that Leela could not see the winning line, and shuffled her pieces aimlessly, leading to a 50-move draw. In game 66, Stockfish was given a substantial advantage by the opening, but failed to make the most of it. The evaluations were leveling out to zero when the internet connection to the GPU servers was cut off. By tournament rules, this meant the game was replayed from scratch. After a further internet disconnection and restart, Stockfish handled the opening better and won, leaving Leela with a 1-point lead.

In the last third of the superfinal, there followed more drama as Leela often built up strong advantages, but Stockfish showed great resourcefulness in defending inferior positions. Meanwhile, although Stockfish created fewer chances, it was ruthless whenever it gained the advantage, winning games 80 and 85. After drawing the final 15 games, Stockfish won the superfinal by the narrow margin of one game (50.5-49.5, +10 =81 -9).

Pos	Engine	Pld	W	D	L	Pts	Qualification
1	Stockfish	100	10	81	9	50.5	TCEC Season 14 Champion
2	LCZero	100	9	81	10	49.5	

== Notable games ==
These notable games are selected by Grandmaster Matthew Sadler.

=== Game 17 ===
Leela Chess Zero–Stockfish, game 17

Position: a8 black rook, f8 black rook, g8 black king, a7 black pawn, b7 black pawn, c7 black pawn, e7 black queen, g7 black pawn, h7 black pawn, c6 black knight, d6 black pawn, f6 black knight, h5 black bishop, c4 white pawn, f4 white bishop, c3 white pawn, d3 white queen, f3 white knight, g3 white pawn, h3 white pawn, a2 white pawn, e2 white pawn, f2 white pawn, g2 white bishop, a1 white rook, e1 white king, h1 white rook

White to move. White is up a pawn, but in compensation Black's pieces are active and he has a flexible pawn structure. Leela played 14. c5!, returning its extra pawn to nullify Stockfish's structural advantage.

White had had trouble showing much advantage in this line of the Budapest Gambit. Leela came up with the new idea of returning White's extra pawn early to break up Black's queenside pawn structure. A few moves later, Leela froze Black's pawn majority on the queenside with 20.c4, leaving Stockfish with no counterplay and winning smoothly.

1. d4 Nf6 2. c4 e5 3. dxe5 Ng4 4. Bf4 Nc6 5. Nf3 Bb4+ 6. Nc3 Bxc3+ 7. bxc3 Qe7 8. Qd5 f6 9. exf6 Nxf6 10. Qd3 d6 11. g3 O-O 12. Bg2 Bg4 13. h3 Bh5 14. c5 dxc5 15. O-O Rae8 16. Rfe1 Kh8 17. Qb5 Nd8 18. Rad1 a6 19. Qb3 h6 20. c4 Bxf3 21. exf3 Qxe1+ 22. Rxe1 Rxe1+ 23. Kh2 Re7 24. Qb2 Rfe8 25. Be3 b6 26. g4 a5 27. f4 Ne4 28. Qb5 Nf7 29. Qb1 Nfd6 30. Qd3 Nf6 31. Bf3 Ng8 32. Bc1 Rf7 33. Bc6 Ref8 34. Kg3 Re7 35. Kg2 Re6 36. Ba4 Ne7 37. Bc2 Ng6 38. f5 Ne5 39. Qc3 Re7 40. Bf4 Ndf7 41. Qg3 Nd7 42. Bxc7 Rc8 43. h4 Nf6 44. Bf4 Rd7 45. Be3 Rcd8 46. g5 Ng8 47. Bc1 Nd6 48. Bb2 Ne8 49. Bc3 Rf7 50. Qf3 Rd6 51. Kf1 Rfd7 52. Qh5 Re7 53. f6 Ngxf6 54. gxf6 Nxf6 55. Qf3 Kg8 56. h5 Kf8 1-0

=== Game 45 ===
Leela Chess Zero–Stockfish, game 45

Position: c8 black rook, d8 black queen, e8 black rook, f8 black bishop, g8 black king, b7 black bishop, f7 black pawn, g7 black pawn, h7 black knight, a6 black pawn, d6 black pawn, e6 black pawn, h6 black pawn, b5 black pawn, c5 black knight, g5 white pawn, c4 white pawn, d4 white knight, e4 white pawn, h4 white pawn, b3 white pawn, c3 white knight, f3 white queen, a2 white pawn, f2 white pawn, g2 white bishop, c1 white bishop, d1 white rook, e1 white rook, g1 white king

White to move. Black's position is cramped and has very little space, but also no weaknesses, which makes it hard for White to open lines and create play. Having already advanced on the kingside, Leela played 22. b4, playing on the queenside as well.

In the English opening, Hedgehog system, Black's position has a reputation as being cramped but difficult to attack. Leela finds a way regardless with some risky pawn advances on both flanks and managed to generate a large amount of play. Nonetheless, Stockfish defended well and reached a draw successfully.

1. c4 c5 2. Nf3 Nf6 3. g3 b6 4. Bg2 Bb7 5. O-O e6 6. Nc3 Be7 7. d4 cxd4 8. Qxd4 d6 9. e4 Nbd7 10. Qe3 a6 11. b3 O-O 12. Bb2 Re8 13. Nd4 Bf8 14. Rfe1 Qc7 15. Rad1 Nc5 16. h3 Rad8 17. Qf3 Rc8 18. g4 h6 19. h4 Qd8 20. Bc1 b5 21. g5 Nh7 22. b4 Na4 23. Nxa4 bxa4 24. c5 hxg5 25. hxg5 Qe7 26. g6 fxg6 27. Bh3 Qf7 28. Qxf7+ Kxf7 29. e5 dxc5 30. Nxe6 Rxe6 31. Rd7+ Re7 32. Rxb7 Rxb7 33. Bxc8 Rxb4 34. a3 Rh4 35. f4 g5 36. f5 c4 37. Bxa6 c3 38. Bd3 Bc5+ 39. Kg2 Bd4 40. Bc2 Kf8 41. Bd3 Ke7 42. Bb1 Rg4+ 43. Kf3 Rh4 44. Kg3 Kf7 45. Kg2 Ke8 46. Kg3 Ke7 47. Bd3 Kf8 48. Kg2 Ke7 49. Kg3 Kf8 50. Bc2 Kf7 51. Kf3 Kf8 52. Kg2 Rg4+ 53. Kh2 Bf2 54. Rf1 Bd4 55. Re1 Rh4+ 56. Kg2 Rg4+ 57. Kh3 Rh4+ 58. Kg3 Kf7 59. Kg2 Kf8 60. Kf3 Rh2 61. Bxa4 c2 62. Kg3 Bxe5+ 63. Rxe5 Rh1 64. Bxg5 Rg1+ 65. Kf2 Nxg5 66. Bxc2 Ra1 67. a4 Ra2 68. Re2 Ra3 69. Re3 Ra2 70. Re2 Ra3 71. Rd2 Ke7 72. Ke2 Nf3 73. Rd1 Ne5 74. Rd5 Kf6 75. Rd6+ Kg5 76. Rb6 Ra2 77. Kd1 Nc4 78. Rg6+ Kf4 79. Bb3 Ra1+ 80. Kc2 Kxf5 81. Ra6 Ne5 82. Kb2 Re1 83. Rd6 Kf4 84. a5 Ke3 85. Bg8 Nd3+ 86. Ka2 Nc5 87. Rd5 Rc1 88. Kb2 Rc4 89. Rg5 Nd3+ 90. Kb3 Rc8 91. Rxg7 Rc1 92. Ka4 Kd4 93. Rd7+ Ke3 94. Re7+ Kd4 95. Rd7+ Ke3 96. Rd5 Ra1+ 97. Kb5 Rb1+ 98. Kc4 Rc1+ 99. Kb3 Nc5+ 100. Kb4 Na6+ 101. Ka4 Ra1+ 102. Kb3 Nb8 103. Kb2 Ra4 104. Kb3 Ra1 105. Kb2 Ra4 106. Re5+ Kf4 107. Rh5 Kg4 108. Kb3 Ra1 109. Rc5 Nc6 110. Rc4+ Kg5 111. Rc5+ Kf4 112. Rc4+ Ke3 113. Rc3+ Kd2 114. Rc2+ Ke3 115. Rc3+ Kd2 116. Rc2+ Kd3 117. Bc4+ Ke4 118. Re2+ Kf5 119. a6 Nb8 120. Rf2+ Ke4 121. Re2+ Kf5 122. Bd3+ Kg4 123. Re4+ Kg5 124. Re5+ Kf4 125. Re4+ Kg5 126. Re5+ Kf4 127. Rf5+ Ke3 128. Rd5 Nxa6 1/2-1/2

=== Game 53 ===
Leela Chess Zero–Stockfish, game 53

Position: a8 black rook, e8 black king, h8 black rook, a7 black pawn, c7 black queen, d7 black knight, e7 black bishop, f7 black pawn, g7 black pawn, c6 black pawn, e6 black pawn, g6 black pawn, b5 black pawn, e5 white pawn, g5 white pawn, a4 white pawn, d4 white pawn, b3 white queen, c3 white pawn, h3 white pawn, e2 white bishop, f2 white pawn, a1 white rook, c1 white bishop, f1 white king, h1 white rook

Position after 18. a4. A few moves later, White also advanced on the kingside with h4-h5. White's greater space made it easy to play on both flanks, creating threats Black could not cope with.

Reminiscent of game 45 above, Leela attacked on the queenside with 18. a4, then played on the kingside with 23. h5, 24. g6 and finally returned to the queenside with 28. c4. These advances on both flanks left Stockfish stretched too thin, and Leela broke through to a win.

1. d4 d5 2. c4 c6 3. Nf3 Nf6 4. e3 Bf5 5. Nc3 e6 6. Nh4 Bg4 7. Qb3 Qc7 8. h3 Bh5 9. g4 Bg6 10. g5 dxc4 11. Bxc4 Nd5 12. Nxg6 hxg6 13. e4 Nxc3 14. bxc3 Nd7 15. Be2 Bd6 16. e5 Be7 17. Kf1 b5 18. a4 Qa5 19. Kg2 Nb6 20. Qc2 Nxa4 21. Bf3 Qc7 22. h4 Qd7 23. h5 gxh5 24. g6 f6 25. exf6 Bxf6 26. Re1 Rf8 27. Qb3 Be7 28. c4 Rc8 29. cxb5 cxb5 30. Qxe6 Qxe6 31. Rxe6 Rf6 32. Re5 Rxg6+ 33. Kf1 Kf8 34. Rxh5 Kf7 35. Bd5+ Ke8 36. Bd2 a6 37. Re1 Kd7 38. Be4 Rf6 39. Rd5+ Bd6 40. Bf5+ Rxf5 41. Rxf5 Nb2 42. Ke2 Ke6 43. Rg5 Kf7 44. Reg1 Bf8 45. Rf5+ Kg8 46. Be3 b4 47. Rc1 Rb8 48. Bf4 Re8+ 49. Kd2 Rd8 50. Be3 Be7 51. Rc6 Bf6 52. Kc2 Na4 53. Rxa6 Nc3 54. Kd3 Kf7 55. Rfa5 Kg6 56. Rb6 Nd5 57. Rbb5 Ne7 58. Ra1 Rd6 59. Rxb4 Nc6 60. Rba4 Kf5 61. Rb1 Ne5+ 62. Ke2 Nf7 63. Rd1 Rb6 64. Rd2 Kg6 65. Kf3 Ng5+ 66. Bxg5 Bxg5 67. Rd1 Rf6+ 68. Kg2 Bf4 69. Rd3 Kf5 70. Rb3 Rd6 71. Kf3 Bg5 72. Rd3 Bd8 73. Rb4 Rf6 74. Ke2 Rd6 75. Ke3 Rd5 76. Rd1 Be7 77. Ra4 Bf6 78. Rc4 Be7 79. Rb1 Bf6 80. Rbb4 Kg6 81. Ke4 Rd7 82. Ra4 Re7+ 83. Kd3 Rd7 84. Ra5 Bd8 85. Re5 Be7 86. Rb5 Kf7 87. f3 Bf6 88. Ra5 Rb7 89. Raa4 Rb1 90. Ke4 Kg6 91. Ra3 Rb8 92. Rd3 Re8+ 93. Kf4 Kh5 94. Kg3 Rd8 95. d5 Be7 96. Kg2 Bd6 97. Kf1 Kg6 98. Ra4 Kf5 99. Ra7 Kf6 100. Ke2 Re8+ 101. Kd1 Rd8 102. Kc2 Rc8+ 103. Kb3 Rb8+ 104. Kc4 Rc8+ 105. Kb5 g6 106. Ra4 Rc5+ 107. Kb6 Rc1 108. Re4 Kf7 109. Re6 Rb1+ 110. Kc6 Be7 111. Rde3 Bg5 1-0

=== Game 62 ===
Stockfish–Leela Chess Zero, game 62

Position: b8 black king, d8 black rook, g8 black knight, h8 black rook, a7 black pawn, e7 black queen, f7 black pawn, g7 black pawn, h7 black pawn, b6 black pawn, d6 black pawn, a5 black knight, b5 white bishop, c5 black pawn, d5 black bishop, a4 white queen, e4 white pawn, f4 white bishop, c3 white pawn, f3 white pawn, g3 white pawn, h3 white pawn, a2 white pawn, h2 white pawn, a1 white rook, c1 white knight, e1 white king, h1 white rook

Position after 15...Kb8. Black's king is surrounded by weak squares and the kingside is undeveloped, but Black is up a pawn and White does not have many pawn breaks available on the queenside. Leela was able to seal off the queenside a few moves later, but Stockfish regained the pawn by exploiting the weakened a8-h1 diagonal, reaching a draw.

In a seemingly unusual reversal of playstyles, Leela audaciously castled into a dubious-looking queenside and then grabbed an extra pawn while hoping to survive the White attack. GM Sadler confessed that he would never have considered 10...O-O-O.

1. d4 e6 2. c4 b6 3. e4 Bb4+ 4. Nc3 Bb7 5. f3 Qh4+ 6. g3 Bxc3+ 7. bxc3 Qe7 8. Qa4 c5 9. Bd3 Nc6 10. Ne2 O-O-O 11. Bf4 d6 12. d5 Na5 13. Nc1 exd5 14. cxd5 Bxd5 15. Bb5 Kb8 16. O-O Be6 17. Bd2 Qb7 18. Nb3 Nxb3 19. axb3 Ne7 20. Be2 f6 21. b4 c4 22. Ra2 b5 23. Qc2 Qb6+ 24. Kh1 a6 25. Rfa1 Bc8 26. Qc1 Bb7 27. Bf1 Rhe8 28. Be3 Qc6 29. Bg2 d5 30. Bf4+ Ka8 31. Be3 dxe4 32. fxe4 Rd3 33. Bc5 Qc8 34. e5 Nd5 35. exf6 gxf6 36. Kg1 Kb8 37. Bd6+ Ka8 38. Qh6 Qd7 39. Qxf6 Qe6 40. Qxe6 Rxe6 41. Bxd5 Rxd6 42. Rxa6+ Rxa6 43. Rxa6+ Kb8 44. Bxb7 Kxb7 45. Ra3 Rd1+ 46. Kf2 Rd2+ 47. Ke3 Rxh2 48. g4 Rh3+ 49. Kd4 Kb6 50. Ke5 h6 51. Kf4 Kb7 52. Kf5 Rf3+ 53. Ke4 Rg3 54. Kf5 Kb6 55. Kf4 Rh3 56. Kf5 Rf3+ 57. Ke4 Rg3 58. Kf5 Rf3+ 59. Ke4 Rh3 60. Ra2 Rg3 61. Kf4 Rxc3 62. Rh2 Rb3 63. Rxh6+ Kc7 64. g5 Rxb4 65. Ke3 Kd7 66. Kd4 Rb3 67. Rh1 Ke6 68. Rf1 Kd6 69. Rf6+ Ke7 70. Kc5 c3 71. Kd4 b4 72. Kd3 Rb1 73. Rf2 Rg1 74. Kc4 Rg4+ 75. Kb3 Kd6 76. g6 Ke5 77. g7 Rxg7 1/2-1/2

=== Game 63 ===
Leela Chess Zero–Stockfish, game 63

Position: a8 black rook, f8 black queen, g8 black king, h8 black rook, d7 black bishop, g7 black pawn, b6 black pawn, e6 black pawn, g6 white pawn, h6 black pawn, a5 black pawn, d5 black pawn, e5 white pawn, a4 white pawn, c4 black pawn, f4 white pawn, c3 white pawn, e2 white queen, f2 white bishop, g2 white pawn, a1 white rook, e1 white king, h1 white rook

Position after 22...Qf8. Black's king has no moves and the rook on h8 is stuck as well. Seven moves later the material deficit had grown to 3 pawns, but with the h8-rook still out of the game, Leela effectively had a crushing material advantage. By the time Stockfish resigned on move 41, the h8-rook had still not moved.

In an attacking game, Leela outplayed Stockfish while displaying advanced understanding of positional concepts: that Black's restricted king was a serious weakness, that Black's h8-rook was entombed, that material balance is unimportant in the position, and that the opposite-colored bishops would not save Black. GM Sadler called this game the one most reminiscent of AlphaZero's wins against Stockfish.

1. e4 e6 2. d4 d5 3. Nc3 Nf6 4. Bg5 Bb4 5. e5 h6 6. Be3 Ne4 7. Qg4 Kf8 8. a3 Bxc3+ 9. bxc3 Nxc3 10. Bd3 b6 11. h4 Nc6 12. h5 Bd7 13. Ne2 Nxe2 14. Qxe2 Ne7 15. a4 a5 16. f4 Nf5 17. Bf2 Nxd4 18. Bxd4 c5 19. Bf2 c4 20. Bg6 fxg6 21. hxg6 Kg8 22. c3 Qf8 23. Qg4 Qf5 24. Qxf5 exf5 25. Rb1 Rb8 26. g4 fxg4 27. e6 Bxa4 28. Kd2 Be8 29. f5 b5 30. Ra1 a4 31. Rhb1 Rc8 32. Bh4 g3 33. Ke3 Bc6 34. Bxg3 Kf8 35. Bd6+ Ke8 36. Rf1 Rd8 37. Bb4 d4+ 38. cxd4 Bd5 39. f6 Bxe6 40. f7+ Kd7 41. f8=R Kc6 1-0

=== Game 81 ===
Leela Chess Zero–-Stockfish, game 81

Position: c8 black bishop, g8 black king, a7 black pawn, e7 black queen, f7 black rook, h7 black pawn, a6 black rook, c6 black pawn, e6 black pawn, g6 black pawn, h6 white pawn, b5 black pawn, d5 black knight, c4 black pawn, d4 white pawn, f3 white rook, b2 white pawn, d2 white bishop, e2 white bishop, f2 white pawn, g2 white pawn, d1 white queen, e1 white rook

Position after 25...Rxa6. Black is up two pawns and has a scary-looking queenside majority, but White demonstrates that the kingside counterplay is more than sufficient for equality. After 26. Rxf7 Qxf7 27. Bg4 Rb6 28. Qe2 a5 29. Qe5 Qf6 30. Qd6 Qe7, Leela refused the repetition and engineered an opposite-colored bishop position where it was down an exchange, but its bishop held back Black's queenside pawns. Nonetheless, there was too little material left for White to make progress, and Stockfish held the draw.

In a game illustrative of her style, Leela advanced pawns on both sides of the board, tying down Black's position. It then sacrificed the a6-pawn to play on the kingside. White's initiative combined with Black's weak King position prevented Black from exploiting his material advantage, although it was insufficient to win.

1. d4 d5 2. c4 c6 3. Nf3 Nf6 4. Nc3 dxc4 5. e4 b5 6. e5 Nd5 7. a4 e6 8. Be2 Be7 9. h4 Bb7 10. h5 Nd7 11. h6 g6 12. Ne4 O-O 13. O-O N5b6 14. a5 Nd5 15. a6 Bc8 16. Re1 f5 17. exf6 N7xf6 18. Nfg5 Nxe4 19. Nxe4 Rb8 20. Bd2 Bf6 21. Ba5 Qe7 22. Nxf6+ Rxf6 23. Bd2 Rf7 24. Ra3 Rb6 25. Rf3 Rxa6 26. Rxf7 Qxf7 27. Bg4 Rb6 28. Qe2 a5 29. Qe5 Qf6 30. Qd6 Qe7 31. Qe5 Qf6 32. Qd6 Qe7 33. Qg3 a4 34. Bg5 Qf7 35. Qd6 c5 36. Qg3 cxd4 37. Bf3 Bb7 38. Qe5 d3 39. Bd8 Ra6 40. Ba5 Ra8 41. Bxd5 Bxd5 42. Bc3 Kf8 43. Bb4+ Kg8 44. Qd4 Rf8 45. Bc3 Qd7 46. Re4 e5 47. Rxe5 Bc6 48. Qe3 Qg4 49. Rg5 Qe4 50. Qa7 Rf7 51. Qb8+ Qe8 52. Qd6 Qe4 53. Qd8+ Rf8 54. Qc7 Rf7 55. Qb8+ Qe8 56. Qd6 Qe7 57. Rxg6+ hxg6 58. Qxg6+ Kf8 59. Qxc6 Kg8 60. Qg6+ Kf8 61. Qg4 Ke8 62. Qh5 Kf8 63. Qg4 Ke8 64. Qh5 Kf8 65. Qd5 Rh7 66. Qf3+ Kg8 67. Qg4+ Kf7 68. Qh5+ Kg8 69. Qg6+ Kf8 70. Qf5+ Kg8 71. Qg4+ Kf7 72. Qh5+ Kg8 73. Qd5+ Kf8 74. Qxb5 Qe6 75. Bg7+ Kf7 76. Qh5+ Ke7 77. g3 Qe1+ 78. Kg2 Qe4+ 79. Kh2 Qe6 80. Kg1 Qe1+ 81. Kg2 Qe4+ 82. Kh2 Kd6 83. Bc3 Kc6 84. Bd2 Rb7 85. Qa5 Rxb2 86. Qa8+ Rb7 87. Qxa4+ Kc5 88. Qa3+ Kc6 89. Qf8 Re7 90. Qf6+ Re6 91. Qa1 Kb7 92. Qb2+ Kc7 93. Bf4+ Kc6 94. Qa1 Kb7 95. Be3 Re7 96. Qf6 Qe6 97. Qd4 Qe4 98. Qf6 Kc7 99. Kg1 Kd7 100. Bd2 Qd5 101. Qa1 Kd8 102. Qh8+ Kd7 103. Qf6 Re5 104. Qg7+ Re7 105. Qf6 Re2 106. Qa1 Qc5 107. Qg7+ Kc6 108. Qf6+ Qd6 109. Qc3 Qe6 110. h7 Qf7 111. Qd4 Qxh7 112. Qxc4+ Kb7 113. Qb5+ Kc8 114. Qa6+ Qb7 115. Qc4+ Qc7 116. Qxd3 Re7 117. Qf5+ Kb7 118. Qb1+ Ka6 119. Be3 Qd6 120. Qc1 Kb5 121. Kh2 Qe6 122. Qc5+ Ka4 123. g4 Qe4 124. Qd6 Rf7 125. Qd1+ Kb4 126. Kg3 Qe5+ 127. Kg2 Re7 128. Qf1 Qd5+ 129. Kg3 Re4 130. Bf4 Rc4 131. Qe2 Qd4 132. Qf3 Kb5 133. Qb7+ Ka4 134. Qf3 Kb5 135. g5 Rc3 136. Be3 Qe5+ 137. Kg4 Rc4+ 138. Bf4 Qe6+ 139. Kg3 Kc5 140. Qd3 Re4 141. Qc3+ Kb5 142. Qf6 Kc6 143. Qd8 Re1 144. Qc7+ Kb5 145. Qb7+ Kc4 146. Qa8 Rg1+ 147. Kh2 Re1 148. Kg3 Rg1+ 149. Kh2 Rb1 150. Qa2+ Rb3 151. Qc2+ Kb5 152. Bg3 Kb6 153. Qc7+ Kb5 154. Qb7+ Ka4 155. Qa8+ Kb4 156. Qb7+ Ka3 157. Qh7 Kb4 158. Bf4 Kc4 159. Bg3 Kc3 160. Bf4 Kb2 161. Bg3 Qg4 162. Qg7+ Kb1 163. Qg6+ Kc1 164. Qf6 Kb1 165. Qg6+ Kb2 166. Qf6+ Kc2 167. g6 Rf3 168. Qc6+ Rc3 169. Qa6 Kb3 170. Qb7+ Kc2 171. g7 Rc5 172. f3 Qh5+ 173. Kg2 Qg6 174. Kf2 Rg5 175. Qc7+ Kd3 176. Qd7+ Kc4 177. Qa4+ Kd5 178. Qa2+ Kd4 179. Qa7+ Kc4 180. Qa4+ Kd5 181. Qb3+ Kc5 182. Qa3+ Kd4 183. Qb4+ Kd5 184. Qb3+ Kc5 185. f4 Rg4 186. Qe3+ Kb4 187. Qd4+ Ka3 188. Qc5+ Ka4 189. Qd4+ Ka3 190. Qc5+ Kb3 191. Qb5+ Kc2 192. Qc4+ Kb1 193. Qb4+ Ka1 194. Qe1+ Ka2 195. Qe2+ Ka1 196. Qe1+ Ka2 197. Qe2+ Kb1 198. Qb5+ Kc2 199. Qc4+ Kb2 200. Qb4+ Kc1 201. Qa3+ Kb1 202. Qb3+ Kc1 203. Qa3+ Kb1 204. Qb4+ Ka2 205. Qa5+ Kb3 206. Qd5+ Kb4 207. Qb7+ Ka3 208. Qf3+ Kb4 209. Qb7+ Ka3 210. Qf3+ Ka4 211. Qa8+ Kb5 212. Qd5+ Kb6 213. Qd4+ Kb7 214. Qd7+ Ka6 215. f5 Qxg7 216. Qe6+ Ka5 217. Qd5+ Ka4 218. Qc6+ Kb3 219. Qf3+ Ka4 220. f6 Qa7+ 221. Kg2 Qd4 222. f7 Qg7 223. Qc6+ Ka3 224. Qa6+ Kb4 225. Qb6+ Ka4 226. Qa7+ Kb3 227. Qe3+ Kc4 228. Qe6+ Kb4 229. Qe1+ Kb3 230. Qf2 Ka4 231. Qc2+ Kb4 232. Qd2+ Kc4 233. Qe2+ Kb3 234. Qb5+ Ka2 235. Qa6+ Kb3 236. Qb7+ Kc2 237. Qc6+ Kd2 238. Qd5+ Rd4 239. Qa5+ Kd1 240. Qa1+ Kc2 241. Qa2+ Kd1 242. Qb3+ Kd2 243. Qb2+ Kd1 244. Qb1+ Kd2 245. Qa2+ Kd1 246. Qb3+ Kd2 247. Qf3 Rd8 248. Qf4+ Kd1 249. Kf1 Qc3 250. Bf2 Qb3 251. Bh4 Qd3+ 252. Kf2 Qc2+ 253. Kg1 Qg6+ 254. Bg5 Qb6+ 255. Kf1 Qa6+ 256. Kg1 Qb6+ 257. Kf1 Qb5+ 258. Kf2 Qe2+ 259. Kg1 Qe1+ 260. Kg2 Qe2+ 261. Kg1 Qe1+ 262. Kg2 Qe2+ 263. Kg3 Rd3+ 264. Kh4 Qf3 265. Qa4+ Ke2 266. Bf4 Qh3+ 267. Kg5 Rd5+ 268. Kf6 Rf5+ 269. Kg7 Qg4+ 270. Kf8 Rxf4 1/2-1/2

=== Game 85 ===
Leela Chess Zero–Stockfish, game 85

Position: a8 black rook, b8 black knight, c8 black bishop, f8 black rook, g8 black king, a7 black pawn, b7 black pawn, c7 black pawn, g7 black bishop, h7 black pawn, d6 black pawn, g6 black pawn, d5 white pawn, e5 black pawn, f5 black pawn, c4 black knight, e4 white pawn, c3 white knight, f3 white pawn, a2 white pawn, b2 white pawn, e2 white king, h2 white pawn, a1 white rook, e1 white queen, g1 white knight, h1 white rook

One move out of the opening book and down a queen for two bishops + 2 pawns, Stockfish played 13...f5, immediately opening the position for the Bishops.
Leela Chess Zero–Stockfish, game 85

Position: h8 white queen, a7 white pawn, e6 black knight, g6 black pawn, c5 black pawn, g5 black king, g4 black bishop, f3 black pawn, g3 black bishop, f1 white king

Leela expected 59...Nc7 to prevent the pawn from promoting, but Stockfish had seen that it didn't matter if the pawn promotes because White's king is so close to being checkmated. Leela only realized she was in trouble after 59...Bf5, threatening 60...Bd3+ 61. Kg1 f2+ followed by promoting on f1 with check.

The opening book for this game had Black sacrifice his queen for two bishops and two pawns, as well as superior pawn structure and king safety. Playing Black, Stockfish wasted no time opening the position for the bishops. By move 17, it evaluated the position as favourable for Black; Leela agreed a few moves later.

The game featured an unusual ending: with White's position crumbling, Leela went for what it thought was a drawing line. Both engines thought they were making progress: Leela's eval was trending towards 0.00, while Stockfish's evaluation kept increasing. By move 59, Leela thought it was within reach of a draw and evaluated the position as -0.06, while Stockfish was confidently claiming a forced mate. Leela only realized how dire her position was when Stockfish did not play 59...Nc7 to stop White from promoting her pawn. The game ended quickly afterwards.

1. d4 Nf6 2. c4 g6 3. Nc3 Bg7 4. e4 d6 5. f3 O-O 6. Be3 e5 7. d5 Nh5 8. Qd2 Qh4+ 9. g3 Nxg3 10. Qf2 Nxf1 11. Qxh4 Nxe3 12. Ke2 Nxc4 13. Qe1 f5 14. h4 fxe4 15. Nxe4 c6 16. Qd1 Bd7 17. Kf2 Bf5 18. Ng3 Nxb2 19. Qb3 Nd3+ 20. Kg2 Nc5 21. Qd1 Bd7 22. h5 Nba6 23. Rc1 Rf6 24. N1e2 Raf8 25. h6 Bh8 26. Rf1 g5 27. Kg1 Rxh6 28. Ne4 Rf7 29. N2c3 Rg6 30. dxc6 Bxc6 31. Rc2 Bg7 32. Rd2 Bf8 33. Nxd6 Rf4 34. Ne2 Ba4 35. Qe1 Bxd6 36. Nxf4 gxf4+ 37. Kh1 Bc7 38. Rh2 Nd7 39. Rg1 Bc6 40. Rxg6+ hxg6 41. Qh4 Bxf3+ 42. Kg1 Bb6+ 43. Kf1 Bh5 44. Qe7 Nac5 45. Rf2 Nf8 46. Qxe5 Nfe6 47. a4 Bc7 48. Qd5 Bg4 49. Rc2 Bh3+ 50. Ke2 b6 51. Qa8+ Kf7 52. Qxa7 Kf6 53. a5 Bf5 54. Rxc5 bxc5 55. Qa8 Bg4+ 56. Kf1 f3 57. Qh8+ Kg5 58. a6 Bg3 59. a7 Bf5 60. Qh1 Bd3+ 61. Kg1 Nd4 62. Qh2 Bxh2+ 63. Kf2 Kf4 64. Ke1 0-1
