= Ikarus (chess) =

Ikarus is a computer chess program created by brothers Munjong and Muntsin Kolss.

== History ==
=== Development ===
Development began in 1997 and it competed in its first ICGA event in 1998 at the 9th World Computer Chess Championship, held in Paderborn, finishing in 26th place with 2 points from 7 games. Three years later, in Maastricht, it performed better, finishing in eighth place with 4.5/9 and scoring 5/9 for sixth place in the World Computer Speed Chess Championship.

=== Champion of the World ===
Ikarus won the World Computer Speed Chess Championship, held in Turin in May 2006. It finished in ninth place at the World Championship main event.
