= Top Chess Engine Championship =

Chess championship held between chess engines

Top Chess Engine Championship, formerly known as Thoresen Chess Engines Competition (TCEC or nTCEC), is a computer chess tournament that has been run since 2010. It was organized, directed, and hosted by Martin Thoresen until the end of Season 6; from Season 7 onward it has been organized by Chessdom. It is often regarded as the Unofficial World Computer Chess Championship because of its strong participant line-up and long time-control matches on high-end hardware, giving rise to very high-class chess. The tournament has attracted nearly all the top engines compared to the World Computer Chess Championship.

After a short break in 2012, TCEC was restarted in early 2013 (as nTCEC) and is currently active (renamed as TCEC in early 2014) with 24/7 live broadcasts of chess matches on its website.

Since season 5, TCEC has been sponsored by Chessdom Arena.

== Overview ==
=== Basic structure of competition ===
The TCEC competition is divided into seasons, where each season happens over a course of a few months, with matches played round-the-clock and broadcast live over the internet. Each season is divided into several tournaments: a Leagues Season, a Cup, a Swiss tournament, a Fischer Random Chess tournament. Additionally, seasons contain various bonus contests, like the 'Viewer Submitted Opening Bonus'.

Prior to season 21, there was originally one tournament in each season. This tournament consisted of several qualifying stages and one "superfinal", and the winner of the superfinal is called the "TCEC Grand Champion" until the next season. Prior to season 11, the tournament used a cup format, while starting in Season 11, the tournament used a division system. Starting in season 13, there was also a cup tournament consisting of the top 32 engines in the main tournament, resulting in a 5-round single elimination tournament.

=== Engine settings/characteristics ===
Pondering is set to off. All engines run on Linux on the same hardware and use the same opening book, which is set by the organizers and changed in every stage. Large pages are enabled, and access to endgame tablebases including Syzygy 7-men is permitted. Engines are allowed updates between stages; if there is a critical play-limiting bug, they are also allowed to be updated once during the stage. In previous seasons, if an engine crashes 3 times in one event, it is disqualified to avoid distorting the results for the other engines; however, starting in TCEC Season 20, an engine is allowed to crash any number of times without being disqualified from the current event, although the engine will still be disqualified from future events unless the crash is fixed. TCEC generates an Elo rating list from the matches played during the tournament. An initial rating is given to any new participant based on its rating in other chess engine rating lists.

=== Criteria for entering the competition ===
There is no definite criterion for entering into the competition, other than inviting the top participants under active development from various rating lists which can run on their Linux platform. Originally, TCEC used Windows instead of Linux. In addition, either XBoard or UCI protocol are required to participate.

Usually chess engines that support multiprocessor mode are preferred (8-cores or higher), and engines in active development are given preference. Since TCEC 12, engines like LCZero which use GPUs for neural processing were supported.

Initially, the list of participants was personally chosen by Thoresen before the start of a season. His stated goal was to include "every major engine that is not a direct clone". In TCEC 13, DeusX was banned due to being a clone of Leela, and in TCEC 20, Houdini, Fire, Rybka (engine in Fritz up to TCEC 16), and Critter were banned due to allegations of plagiarism.

== Tournament results ==
The number within the brackets () denote the number of times the engine has won the particular competition.

=== TCEC Seasons ===
Season	Date	TCEC Grand Champion	Elite match/Superfinal score	Runner-up
TCEC Season 1	Dec 2010 – Feb 2011	Houdini 1.5a (1) (Note: Houdini has been disqualified since season 20 and its results in previous seasons, except those of Houdini 4 and earlier versions, have been nullified.)	+ 12 = 23 - 5	Rybka 4.0
TCEC Season 2	Feb – Apr 2011	Houdini 1.5a (2)	+ 9 = 26 - 5	Rybka 4.1
TCEC Season 3	Apr – May 2011	N/A (season not completed)		
TCEC Season 4 (Note: Originally named "nTCEC Season 1")	Jan – May 2013	Houdini 3 (3)	+ 6 = 38 - 4	Stockfish 250413
TCEC Season 5 (Note: Originally named "nTCEC Season 2")	Aug – Dec 2013	Komodo 1142 (1)	+ 10 = 30 - 8	Stockfish 191113
TCEC Season 6	Feb – May 2014	Stockfish 170514 (1)	+ 13 = 45 - 6	Komodo 7x
TCEC Season 7 (Note: Season 7 did not use endgame table bases at all and Stage two did not use opening books either.)	Sep – Dec 2014	Komodo 1333 (2)	+ 7 = 53 - 4	Stockfish 141214
TCEC Season 8	Aug – Nov 2015	Komodo 9.3x (3)	+ 9 = 89 - 2	Stockfish 021115
TCEC Season 9	May – Dec 2016	Stockfish 8 (2)	+ 17 = 75 - 8	~~Houdini 5~~
TCEC Season 10	Oct – Dec 2017	~~Houdini 6.03 (4)~~	+ 15 = 76 - 9	Komodo 1970.00
TCEC Season 11	Jan – Apr 2018	Stockfish 260318 (3)	+ 20 = 78 - 2	~~Houdini 6.03~~
TCEC Season 12	Apr – Jul 2018	Stockfish 180614 (4)	+ 29 = 62 - 9	Komodo 12.1.1
TCEC Season 13	Aug – Nov 2018	Stockfish 18102108 (5)	+ 16 = 78 - 6	Komodo 2155.00
TCEC Season 14	Nov 2018 – Feb 2019	Stockfish 190203 (6)	+ 10 = 81 - 9	LCZero v0.20.2-32930
TCEC Season 15	Mar – May 2019	LCZero v0.21.1-nT40.T8.610 (1)	+ 14 = 79 - 7	Stockfish 19050918
TCEC Season 16	Jul – Oct 2019	Stockfish 19092522 (7)	+ 14 = 81 - 5	AllieStein v0.5-dev_7b41f8c-n11
TCEC Season 17	Jan – Apr 2020	LCZero v0.24-sv-t60-3010 (2)	+ 17 = 71 - 12	Stockfish 20200407DC
TCEC Season 18	May – Jul 2020	Stockfish 202006170741 (8)	+ 23 = 61 - 16	LCZero v0.25.1-svjio-t60-3972-mlh
TCEC Season 19	Aug – Oct 2020	Stockfish 202009282242_nn-baeb9ef2d183 (9)	+ 18 = 73 - 9	LCZero v0.26.3-rc1_T60.SV.JH.92-190
TCEC Season 20	Dec 2020 – Feb 2021	Stockfish 20210113 (10)	+ 14 = 78 - 8	LCZero 0.27.0d-Tilps-dje-magic_JH.94-100
TCEC Leagues Season 21	May – Aug 2021	Stockfish 14_202107131735 (11)	+ 19 = 74 - 7	LCZero 0.28-dev+_69626
TCEC Leagues Season 22	Jan – Apr 2022	Stockfish dev15_20220401 (12)	+ 28 = 63 - 9	KomodoDragon 2894.00
TCEC Leagues Season 23	Aug – Nov 2022	Stockfish dev16_20221027 (13)	+ 27 = 63 - 10	LCZero 0.30-dag-9a9c42d
TCEC Leagues Season 24	Feb – Apr 2023	Stockfish dev-20230409 (14)	+ 20 = 64 - 16	LCZero 0.30-dag-a9b25c2b
TCEC Leagues Season 25	Aug – Oct 2023	Stockfish dev-20231010 (15)	+ 27 = 50 - 23	LCZero 0.31-dag-e429eeb-BT3
TCEC Leagues Season 26	May – Jun 2024	Stockfish dev-20240513 (16)	+ 31 = 52 - 17	LCZero 0.31-dag-5350a2e-BT4
TCEC Leagues Season 27	Oct 2024 – Jan 2025	Stockfish dev-20241208 (17)	+ 35 = 47 - 18	LCZero 0.31-dag-f7fb268-BT4
TCEC Leagues Season 28	Jun – Sep 2025	Stockfish dev-20250824 (18)	+ 36 = 43 - 21	LCZero 0.33-dev-b4e98c1-BT4
TCEC Leagues Season 29	Jan – Apr 2026	Stockfish dev-20260318 (19)	+ 41 = 36 - 23	Reckless 0.10.0-dev-b5462f11

=== TCEC Cups ===
Tournament	Date	Winner	Finals score	Runner-up
TCEC Cup 1	Oct 2018	Stockfish 270918 (1)	+ 1 = 7 - 0	~~Houdini 6.03~~
TCEC Cup 2	Jan 2019	LCZero v0.20.1-32742 (1)	+ 1 = 7 - 0	~~Houdini 6.03~~
TCEC Cup 3	May 2019	LCZero v0.21.1-nT40.T6.532 (2)	+ 2 = 7 - 1	Stockfish 19042711
TCEC Cup 4	Oct 2019	Stockfish 19100908 (2)	+ 1 = 7 - 0	LCZero v0.22.0-nT2
TCEC Cup 5	Apr 2020	Stockfish 202004181536 (3)	+ 1 = 3 - 0	LCZero v0.24-sv-t60-3010
TCEC Cup 6	Jul 2020	AllieStein v0.7_dev2-net_15.0 (1)	+ 1 = 3 - 0	LCZero v0.26.0_sv-t60-4229-mlh_opt2
TCEC Cup 7	Nov 2020	Stockfish 2020102823_nn-2eb2e0707c2b (4)	+ 1 = 3 - 0	LCZero v0.26.3_T60.SV.JH.92-270
TCEC Cup 8	Feb 2021	Stockfish 202102202249 (5)	+ 1 = 7 - 0	LCZero 0.27.0-pr1509_JH.94-100
TCEC Cup 9	Oct 2021	Stockfish dev15_20211015 (6)	+ 1 = 3 - 0	LCZero 0.28-dev+_609958
TCEC Cup 10	May 2022	Stockfish dev16_2022051413 (7)	+ 2 = 9 - 1	KomodoDragon 3
TCEC Cup 11	Jan 2023	LCZero 0.30-dag-dcb4ece9-BT2-3250000 (3)	+ 2 = 13 - 1	Stockfish dev16_202301021914
TCEC Cup 12	Jul 2023	Stockfish dev-20230713 (8)	+ 10 = 9 - 9	LCZero 0.31-dag-dd64c7e-T1
TCEC Cup 13	Mar 2024	Stockfish dev-20240217 (9)	+ 4 = 17 - 1	LCZero 0.31-dag-5c1051f-BT4
TCEC Cup 14	Oct 2024	Stockfish dev-20240928 (10)	+ 12 = 13 - 11	LCZero 0.31-dag-4167c1e-BT4
TCEC Cup 15	Jun 2025	Stockfish dev-20250602 (11)	+ 6 = 13 - 3	LCZero 0.31-dag-c5f4683-BT4
TCEC Cup 16	Jan 2026	Stockfish dev-20260101 (12)	+ 7 = 12 - 3	LCZero 0.33-dev-7499292-BT4

=== TCEC Swiss ===
Tournament	Date	Winner	Runner-up
TCEC Swiss 1	Apr 2021	KomodoDragon 2679.08 (1)	Stockfish 20210310
TCEC Swiss 2	Nov – Dec 2021	KomodoDragon 2.5.1 (2)	Stockfish 14.1_20211101
TCEC Swiss 3	May – Jul 2022	Stockfish dev16_20220521 (1)	LCZero 0.30-dev+_783363
TCEC Swiss 4	Jan – Feb 2023	Stockfish dev-20230114 (2)	LCZero 0.30-dag-6b5f9451, KomodoDragon 3.2
TCEC Swiss 5	Jun - Jul 2023	Stockfish dev-20230614 (3)	LCZero 0.31-dag-dd64c7e-T1
TCEC Swiss 6	Jan – Feb 2024	LCZero 0.31-dag-a487796-BT3 (1)	Stockfish dev-20240114
TCEC Swiss 7	Sep 2024	LCZero 0.31-dag-321205e-BT4 (2)	Stockfish 17
TCEC Swiss 8	Apr - Jun 2025	Stockfish dev-20250513 (4)	LCZero 0.31-dag-c5f4683-BT4
TCEC Swiss 9	Nov - Dec 2025	Stockfish dev-20251203 (5)	LCZero 0.33-dev-7499292-BT4
TCEC Swiss 10	Oct - Nov 2026	Stockfish dev-20260930 (6)	PlentyChess 8.0.5

=== TCEC FRC (Fischer Random Chess) ===
Replaced by TCEC FRD.

Tournament	Date	Winner	Final/Superfinal score	Runner-up
TCEC FRC 1	Oct – Nov 2019	Stockfish 191107 (1)	+ 10 = 10 - 0	AllieStein v0.5_c328142-n11.1
TCEC FRC 2	Nov 2020	Stockfish 202011101829_nn-c3ca321c51c9 (2)	+ 8 = 42 - 0	LCZero v0.26.3_T60.SV.JH.92-330
TCEC FRC 3	Mar 2021	KomodoDragon 2671.00 (1)	+ 2 = 47 - 1	Stockfish 20210226
TCEC FRC 4	Dec 2021 – Jan 2022	Stockfish dev15_2021121915 (3)	+ 13 = 28 - 9	LCZero 0.29-dev+_610826
TCEC FRC 5	Jul 2022	Stockfish dev16_20220705 (4)	+ 17 = 20 - 13	LCZero 0.30-dag-bord_784038
TCEC FRC 6	May 2023	Stockfish dev-20230507 (5)	+ 15 = 23 - 12	LCZero 0.31-dag-1f90473-T1

=== TCEC DFRC (double Fischer Random Chess) ===
Replaced by TCEC FRD. In DFRC, the start positions of the pieces are randomized independently for both players.

Tournament	Date	Winner	Final score	Runner-up
TCEC DFRC 1	Jul – Aug 2022	Stockfish dev16_202207131801 (1)	+ 18 = 23 - 9	LCZero 0.30-dag-bord-dfrc_784038
TCEC DFRC 2	May - Jun 2023	Stockfish dev-20230528 (2)	+ 10 = 33 - 7	LCZero 0.31-dag-590cd9ba-T1

=== TCEC FRD (Fischer Random Double) ===
In FRD, which has superseded both FRC and DFRC, the qualifying rounds are played in the Fischer Random System and the finals in the double Fischer Random System.

Tournament	Date	Winner	Final score	Runner-up
TCEC FRD 1	Nov - Dec 2023	Stockfish dev-20231116 (1)	+ 11 = 29 - 10	LCZero 0.31-dag-a487796-BT3
TCEC FRD 2	Jun - Jul 2024	Stockfish dev-20240612 (2)	+ 20 = 16 - 14	LCZero 0.31-dag-5350a2e-BT4
TCEC FRD 3	Feb 2025	Stockfish dev-20250126 (3)	+ 13 = 25 - 12	LCZero 0.31-dag-c93c6a8-BT4
TCEC FRD 4	Sep - Oct 2025	Stockfish dev-20250913 (4)	+ 18 = 18 - 14	LCZero 0.33-dev-f20db7e-BT4
TCEC FRD 5	Apr - May 2026	Stockfish dev-20260525 (5)	+ 21 = 21 - 8	Torch dev-20260417

=== TCEC 4k ===
Engines are limited to 4 KiB (4,096 bytes) in program size.

Tournament	Date	Winner	Final score	Runner-up
TCEC 4kI	Dec 2022	ice4 9e94b82	45.5/48 (RR)	4ku 1.0
TCEC 4kII	May 2023	ice4 v3	+ 5 = 15 - 4	4ku 3.0
TCEC 4kIII	Dec 2023 – Jan 2024	4ku 4.0	+ 13 = 30 - 7	ice4 4
TCEC 4kIV	Aug 2024	ice4 5	+ 29 = 20 - 1	4ku 5.0
TCEC 4kV	Apr 2025	ice4 6	+ 29 = 20 - 1	4ku 5.1
TCEC 4kVI	Oct-Nov 2025	ice4 6.1	+ 11 = 33 - 6	c4ke 1.1

=== Other TCEC tournaments ===
Tournament	Date	Winner	Runner-up
TCEC Season 6 FRC	Jun – Jul 2014	Stockfish 260614	Houdini 4
TCEC Season 9 Rapid (Note: Double round robin tournament.)	Sep 2016	~~Houdini 200716~~	Komodo 1692.19
TCEC Season 10 Rapid	Dec 2017	Stockfish 051117	~~Houdini 6.03~~
TCEC Season 10 Blitz	Dec 2017	Komodo 1959.00	Stockfish 051117
TCEC Season 23 Chess Bonus	Aug 2022	Stockfish dev16_202208061357	KomodoDragon 3.1

== See also ==
- Chess engine
- Computer chess
- Chess.com Computer Chess Championship
- World Computer Chess Championship
- World Computer Speed Chess Championship
- Dutch Open Computer Chess Championship
- North American Computer Chess Championship

== Sources ==
- Additional information for Season 4
- Additional information for Season 5
- "TCEC Season 8 – complete information". chessdom.com. August 18, 2015.
- Perez-Franco, Roberto (January 15, 2014). "DIGITAL CHESS REVIEW: One chess champion per laptop". The Tech. 133 (62).
- TCEC Season 12 report, by Guy Haworth and Nelson Hernandez
- TCEC Season 13 report, by Guy Haworth and Nelson Hernandez
- Sadler, Matthew (7 November 2019). "The TCEC14 Computer Chess Superfinal: a perspective". ICGA Journal. 41 (3): 152. doi:10.3233/ICG-190116. S2CID 208114100.
- Sadler, Matthew (7 November 2019). "The TCEC15 Computer Chess Superfinal: a perspective". ICGA Journal. 41 (3): 164-167. doi:10.3233/ICG-190112. S2CID 208122943.
- Sadler, Matthew (6 February 2020). "The TCEC16 Computer Chess Superfinal: a perspective". ICGA Journal. 41 (4): 253-258. doi:10.3233/ICG-190123. S2CID 212564356.
- Sadler, Matthew (10 November 2020). "The TCEC17 Computer Chess Superfinal: a perspective". ICGA Journal. 42 (2–3): 192-206. doi:10.3233/ICG-200153. S2CID 226548340.
- Sadler, Matthew (10 November 2020). "The TCEC18 Computer Chess Superfinal: a perspective". ICGA Journal. 42 (2–3): 223-236. doi:10.3233/ICG-200161. S2CID 226551192.
- Sadler, Matthew (11 January 2021). "The TCEC19 Computer Chess Superfinal: a perspective". ICGA Journal. 42 (4): 306-320. doi:10.3233/ICG-200173. S2CID 231947849.
- Sadler, Matthew (26 May 2021). "The TCEC20 Computer Chess Superfinal: a perspective". ICGA Journal. 43 (1): 74-87. doi:10.3233/ICG-210184. S2CID 235453638.
- Hernandez, Nelson; Haworth, Guy (October 2019). "TCEC15: The 15th Top Chess Engine Championship" (PDF). ICGA Journal. 41 (314): 153–163. doi:10.3233/ICG-190115. S2CID 208643228.
