= World Computer Speed Chess Championship =

Chess Championship

World Computer Speed Chess Championship was an annual event organized by the International Computer Games Association where computer chess engines compete against each other at blitz chess time controls. It was held in conjunction with the World Computer Chess Championship up until 2024. Up to 2001, it was held in conjunction with the World Microcomputer Chess Championship (WMCCC) and restricted to microcomputers.

== Championship results ==
Event #	Year	Location	Participants	Winner
	1995	Paderborn, Germany		The King
	1996	Jakarta, Indonesia		Ferret
	1997	Paris, France		Ferret
	2000	London, United Kingdom		Fritz
	2001	Maastricht, Netherlands		Goliath
10	2002	Maastricht, Netherlands		Shredder
11	2003	Graz, Austria		Shredder
12	2004	Ramat Gan, Israel		Shredder
13	2005	Reykjavík, Iceland	8	Shredder
14	2006	Turin, Italy	14	Ikarus
15	2007	Amsterdam, Netherlands		Shredder
16	2008	Beijing, China		Sjeng
17	2009	Pamplona, Spain		Shredder
18	2010	Kanazawa, Japan		Jonny and Shredder
19	2011	Tilburg, Netherlands		Jonny
20	2013	Yokohama, Japan	4	Shredder
21	2015	Leiden, Netherlands	8	Komodo
22	2016	Leiden, Netherlands	6	Jonny
23	2017	Leiden, Netherlands	5	Komodo
24	2018	Stockholm, Sweden	5	Komodo
25	2019	Macau, China	5	Jonny
26 (Note: In 2020 and 2021 there were no events due to the COVID-19 pandemic.)	2022	Vienna, Austria	4	Ginkgo and LCZero
27	2023	Valencia, Spain	4	Fritz
28	2024	Santiago de Compostela, Spain	8	Raptor
