= Jonny (chess) =

Computer chess program created by Johannes Zwanzger

Jonny is a computer chess program written by the German mathematician and programmer Johannes Zwanzger.

Jonny won the 2015 World Computer Chess Championship. It ran on a "btrzx3" linux cluster of the University of Bayreuth using 2,400 AMD x86-64 2.8 GHz cores in total.

== Results ==
- Champion at the World Computer Speed Chess Championship in 2010, 2011, 2016 and 2019
- Runner-up at the World Computer Chess Championship in 2013 and Champion in 2015
- Two times runner up at the Livingston Chess960 Computer World Championship
