= Matthew Sadler =

English chess grandmaster (born 1974)

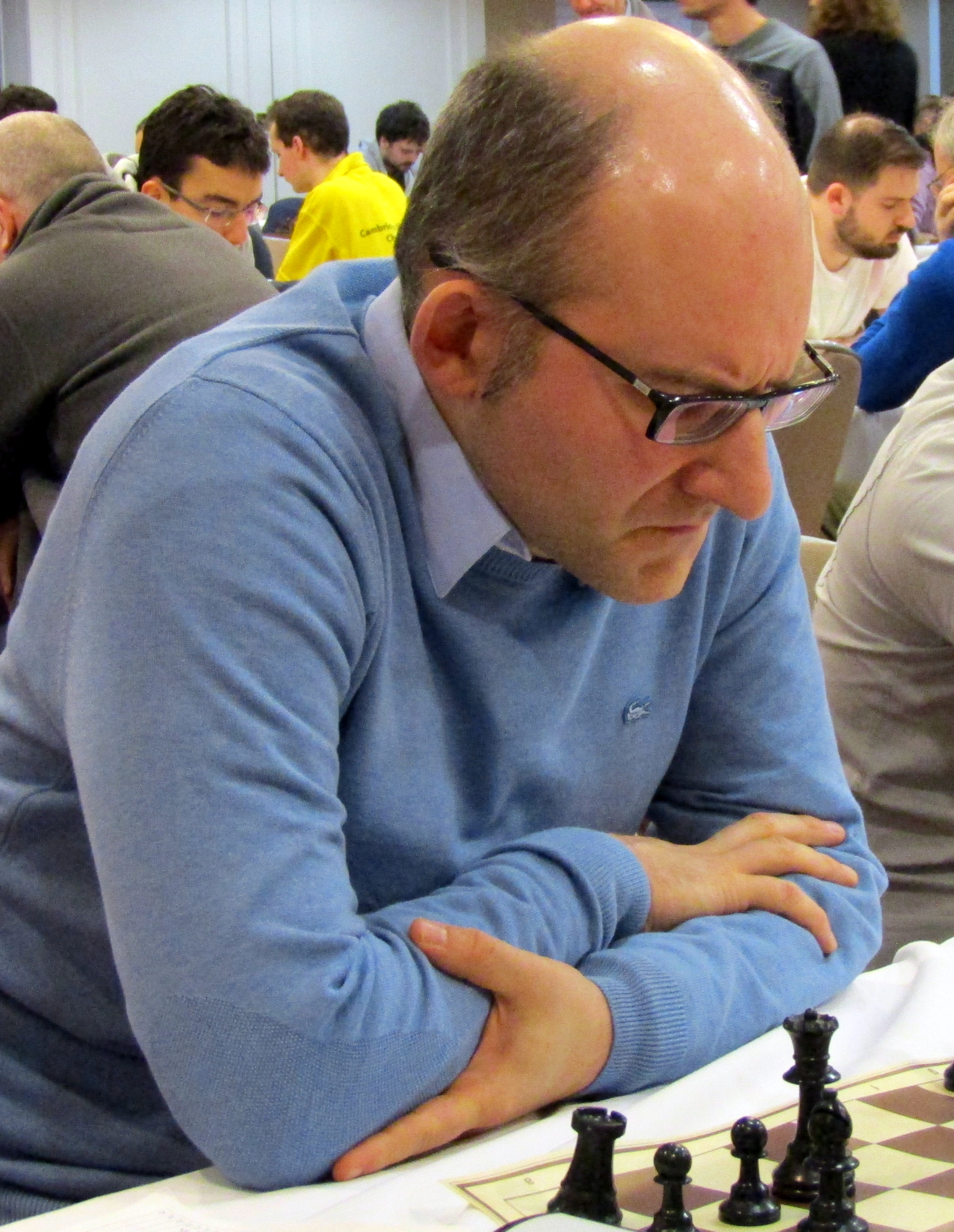
- Sadler in 2017

Personal information
- Born: Matthew David Sadler; 15 May 1974 (age 52) Chatham, England

Chess career
- Country: England
- Title: Grandmaster (1993)
- FIDE rating: 2694 (August 2026)
- Peak rating: 2694 (March 2020)
- Peak ranking: No. 16 (July 1997)

Matthew David Sadler (born 15 May 1974) is an English chess grandmaster, chess writer and two-time British Chess Champion.

== Personal life ==
Sadler has a French mother, speaks French perfectly and is also qualified to play in closed French events. He was tipped to reach the heights scaled by such other leading English players as Michael Adams and Nigel Short but made the decision to cease playing professionally in his mid-20s, opting for an IT career in the Netherlands.

In 1988, Matthew appeared on the first ever episode of British TV show You Bet!. He won an award for successfully identifying the opponent, year and result of memorable chess matches featuring Bobby Fischer by looking at random board displays.

== Chess career ==
Sadler won the British Championship in 1995 at the age of 21 and again in 1997 (jointly with Michael Adams). He represented England in the 1996 Chess Olympiad, scoring 10½/13 and winning a gold medal for the best score on board four (England finished fourth), and also played in 1998 scoring 7½/12. He made 7/9 on board four for England at the European Team Chess Championship in Pula in 1997. His was the best individual score of the five-man English team and so contributed significantly to England's first (and to date only) gold medal in a major competition.

For several years, he was the book reviewer for New In Chess magazine and also wrote books and articles for other chess magazines. In 2000, his book Queen's Gambit Declined (published by Everyman) was awarded the British Chess Federation's book of the year award.

Latterly a resident of Amersfoort, Sadler returned to chess in 2010 to play in a rapidplay tournament held in nearby Wageningen. He won the event with a perfect score of 7/7, finishing ahead of grandmasters Jan Timman, Friso Nijboer and Daniel Fridman. In August 2011, Sadler continued his resurgence by winning the XIII Open Internacional D'Escacs de Sants, scoring 8½/10, ahead of several grandmasters including Jan Smeets. Right thereafter, in October 2011, he went on to compete in the Oslo Chess International; participants included ten other grandmasters, among them Sergei Tiviakov, Jon Ludvig Hammer and Sergey Volkov, all being 2600+ rated. Sadler won convincingly, with 8/9 points and a performance rating of 2849. Going into 2012, the gain in rating points elevated him to fourth rank amongst active English players and also lifted him back into the World Top 100.

In a January 2012 interview, Sadler stated that chess was now primarily a "hobby" for him. While relishing his return to tournament play, Sadler noted that he was now an amateur, and would not be coming back as a professional. He contrasts his present lighthearted attitude with his demeanor during his time as a professional, when he was "working ten hours a day and incredibly intensively".

Since 2019, Sadler has taken an interest in computer chess, especially AlphaZero and the Top Chess Engine Championship (TCEC), writing several books and news articles on the topic: Game Changer, The Silicon Road to Chess Improvement and various articles in the New In Chess magazine.

== Bibliography ==
- Sadler, Matthew (1997). The Slav. Everyman. ISBN 978-1901259001.
- Sadler, Matthew (1998). The Semi-Slav. Everyman. ISBN 978-1901259087.
- Sadler, Matthew (1999). Tips For Young Players. Everyman. ISBN 978-1857442311.
- Sadler, Matthew (2000). Queen's Gambit Declined. Everyman. ISBN 978-1857442564.
- Sadler, Matthew (2012). Study Chess With Matthew Sadler. Everyman. ISBN 978-1857449907.
- Sadler, Matthew; Regan, Natasha (2016). Chess For Life. Gambit. ISBN 978-1910093832.
- Sadler, Matthew; Regan, Natasha (2019). Game Changer. New In Chess. ISBN 978-9056918187.
- Sadler, Matthew (2021). The Silicon Road to Chess Improvement. New In Chess. ISBN 978-9056919832.
- Sadler, Matthew; Giddins, Steve (2023). Re-Engineering the Chess Classics. New In Chess. ISBN 978-9083311265.
