= Olga (name) =

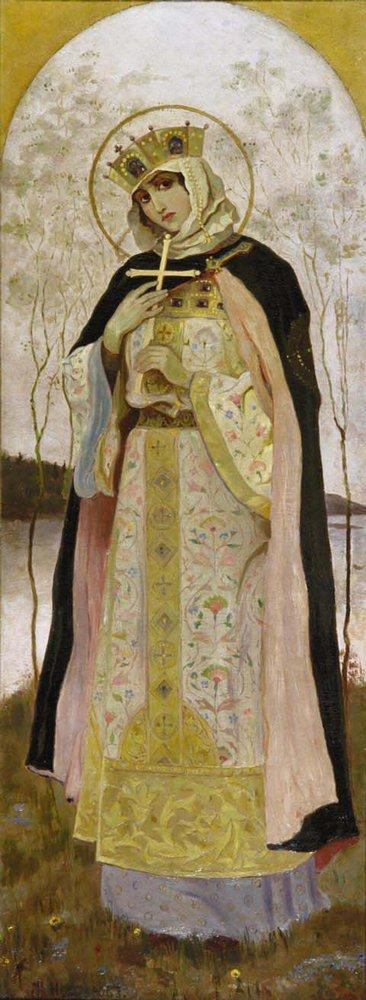
- An icon of St. Olga
- Gender: Female

Origin
- Origin: Old Norse
- Derivation: Helga
- Meaning: Holy; blessed

Other names
- Variant forms: Olha, Volha
- Related names: Olja, Oleg

Olga (Russian: Ольга) is a Russian feminine given name of Scandinavian origin. It is the equivalent of Helga, and derived from the Old Norse adjective heilagr (lit. 'prosperous, successful'). The name was brought by Scandinavian settlers who founded Kievan Rus' in the 9th century.

It is also used in Ukraine (Ольга, transliterated Olha), Belarus (Вольга, transliterated Vol'ha), Bulgaria (Олга transliterated Olga), the Czech Republic, Greece and Cyprus (Όλγα, Ólgha), Georgia (ოლგა (Olga) or more archaic ოლღა (Olgha)), Latvia, Lithuania, Finland, Poland, Hungary, Romania, Serbia, Bosnia (Serbian Олга or Оља), the Balkans, Western Europe and Latin America (Olga). It is also much in use in Scandinavia.

The masculine counterpart is Oleg (Олeг).

== Royalty and nobility ==
- Princess Olga of Greece and Denmark (1903–1997), granddaughter of King George I of Greece and wife of Prince Paul of Yugoslavia
- Princess Olga, Duchess of Apulia (born 1971), Princess of Greece and great-grandchild of Olga, Queen of Greece
- Olga FitzGeorge (1877–1928), English socialite, businesswoman and granddaughter of Prince George, Duke of Cambridge
- Saint Olga of Kiev (890–969), a Varangian noblewoman, regent of Kievan Rus' and wife of Igor of Kiev
- Baroness Olga Vadimovna von Root (1901 – 1967), Russian noblewoman, singer, and stage actress
- Olga Ilyinichna Ulyanova (1871–1891), Russian noblewoman and sister of Vladimir Lenin
- Olga Potocka (1802–1861), Polish countess
- Olga Zherebtsova (1766–1849), Russian aristocrat and socialite
- Olga Cantacuzène-Altieri (1843–1929), Russian-Italian aristocrat and novelist

=== Russian imperial family ===
- Grand Duchess Olga Pavlovna of Russia (1792–1795), fifth daughter of Paul I of Russia
- Olga Nikolaevna of Russia (1822–1892), second daughter of Nicholas I of Russia, wife to Charles I, King of Württemberg
- Grand Duchess Olga Feodorovna of Russia (1839–1891), wife of Grand Duke Michael Nikolaevich of Russia
- Grand Duchess Olga Nikolaevna of Russia (1895–1918), daughter of Nicholas II of Russia
- Grand Duchess Olga Alexandrovna of Russia (1882–1960), daughter of Alexander III of Russia
- Grand Duchess Olga Constantinovna of Russia (1851–1926), Queen consort to George I, King of Greece; reigned as Queen regent of Greece in 1920
- Grand Duchess Olga Alexandrovna of Russia (1882–1960), sister of Nicholas II of Russia
- Grand Duchess Olga Nikolaevna of Russia (1895–1918), eldest daughter of Nicholas II of Russia
- Princess Olga Andreevna Romanoff (born 1950), grandniece of Nicholas II of Russia

== Politicians ==
- Olga Abramova (politician, born 1953), Belarusian politician
- Olga Abramova (politician, born 1981), Russian politician
- Olga Adellach Coma (born 1966), Andorran politician
- Olga Alimova (born 1953), Russian politician
- Olga Amelchenkova, Russian politician
- Olga Anufriyeva, Russian politician
- Olga Bas (born 1964), Russian politician
- Olga Batalina (born 1975), Russian politician
- Olga Beaver (1942–2012), Czech-American politician
- Olga Bennett, Irish politician
- Olga Bielkova (born 1975), Ukrainian politician
- Olga Bodnar (born 1965), Ukrainian politician
- Olga Bjoner (1887–1969), Norwegian politician and journalist
- Olga Cebotari, Moldovan politician and diplomat
- Olga Dibrova (born 1977), Ukrainian diplomat
- Olga Luz Espinosa (born 1976), Mexican politician
- Olga Feliú (1932–2017), Chilean politician and lawyer
- Olga Fonseca, Venezuelan diplomat
- Oľga Glosíková (1953–2024), Slovak politician
- Olga Givernet (born 1981), French politician
- Olga Gauks (born 1987), German politician
- Olga Germanova (born 1961), Russian politician
- Olga Gerovasili (born 1961), Greek politician
- Olga Golodets (born 1962), Russian economist and politician
- Olga Ivanova (born 1984), Estonian politician
- Olga Ivaschenko, Ukrainian electrical engineer and stateswoman
- Olga Kazakova (born 1968), Russian politician
- Olga Kefalogianni (born 1975), Greek politician
- Olga Kefalogianni (born 1975), Greek politician
- Olga Kho, Filipino politician
- Olga Knudsen (1865–1947), Danish politician and women's rights activist
- Olga Kovitidi (born 1962), Crimean politician
- Olga Khokhlova (politician) (born 1957), Russian politician
- Olga Lauristin (1903–2005), Soviet Estonian politician
- Olga Li (born 1986), Russian politician
- Olga Litvinenko (born 1983), Russian politician
- Olga Lipovskaya (1954–2021), Russian feminist
- Olga Lyubimova (born 1980), Russian politician
- Olga Ilich, Canadian politician
- Olga A. Méndez (1925–2009), Puerto Rican politician
- Olga Mistereggen (1894–1970), Norwegian politician
- Olga Nybø (1930–2011), Norwegian politician
- Olga Petrović Njegoš (1859–1896), Montenegrin politician
- Olga Duque de Ospina (died 2019), Colombian politician
- Olga Paterova, Transnistrian politician
- Olga Pellicer, Mexican diplomat
- Olga Petersen (born 1982), German politician
- Olga Pilipenko (born 1966), Russian politician
- Olga Pircher, Austrian politician
- Olga Richterová (born 1985), Czech linguist, translator and politician
- Olga Sánchez Cordero (born 1947), Mexican politician and lawyer
- Olga Savastianova (born 1960), Russian politician
- Olga Seate, South African politician
- Olga Sehnalová (born 1968), Czech politician
- Olga Scheltema-de Nie (1939–2023), Dutch scientist and politician
- Olga Silvestre (born 1964), Portuguese politician
- Olga Sippl (1920–2025), German politician
- Olga Terho (1910–2003), Finnish politician
- Olga Timofeeva (born 1977), Russian politician and journalist
- Olga Timofeyeva (born 1967), Russian politician
- Olga Yepifanova (born 1966), Russian politician
- Olga Vasilyeva (politician) (born 1960), Russian politician and scientist, first female Minister of Education of Russia
- Olga Viscal Garriga (1929–1995), Puerto Rican politician and independence advocate
- Olga Zabralova (born 1980), Russian politician
- Olga Zrihen (born 1953), Moroccan-Belgian politician
- Olga Zammitt (born 1940), Mayor of Gibraltar

== Actresses ==
- Olga Agnew (1899–1987), Australian child actress
- Olga Andersson (1876–1943), Swedish actress
- Olga Antonova (born 1937), Russian actress
- Olga Arendt (1859–1902), German writer and actress
- Olga Arntgolts (born 1982), Russian theater and film actress
- Olga Aroseva (1925–2013), Soviet and Russian actress
- Olga Baclanova (1896–1974), Russian-American actress, radio host and singer
- Olga Barnet (1951–2021), Russian actress
- Olga Brandon (1863–1906), Australian-born stage actress in the United States and England
- Olga Bogdanova (born 1951), Soviet and Russian actress
- Olga Borys (born 1974), Polish actress
- Olga Bołądź (born 1984), Polish actress
- Olga Bisera, Yugoslav-born Italian film actress and producer
- Olga Breeskin (born 1951), Mexican violinist, dancer and actress
- Olga Bucătaru (1942–2020), Romanian actress
- Olga Budina (born 1975), Russian theater and film actress
- Olga Capri (1883–1961), Italian actress
- Olga Chekhova (1897–1980), Russian-German actress
- Olga Chorens (1924–2023), Cuban singer and actress
- Olga Cook, American actress, singer, vaudeville performer
- Olga Desmond (1891–1964), German actress and dancer
- Olga Dickie (1900–1992), British Australian actress
- Olga Dihovichnaya (born 1980), Belarusian actress
- Olga Druce, American producer, public speaker and actress
- Olga Engl (1871–1946), Austrian actress
- Olga Edwardes (1915–2008), British actress
- Olga Fadeeva (born 1972), Belarusian actor
- Olga Fedori (born 1984), Ukrainian actress
- Olga Fonda (born 1982), Russian actress and model
- Olga Frycz (born 1986), Polish actress
- Olga Vittoria Gentilli (1888–1957), Italian actress
- Olga Georges-Picot (1940–1997), French actress
- Olga Grey (1896–1973), American actress
- Olga Gzovskaya (1883–1962), Russian actress
- Olga James (1929–2025), American singer and actress
- Olga Kay (born 1982), Russian-American comedian and actress
- Olga Karlatos (born 1945), Greek actress
- Olga Kabo (born 1968), Soviet and Russian actress
- Olga Kosakiewicz (1915–1983), French actress
- Olga Knipper (1868–1959), Russian and Soviet stage actress
- Olga Kusenko (1919–1997), Soviet and Ukrainian actress
- Olga Kurylenko (born 1979), Ukrainian model and actress
- Olga Kuzmina (born 1987), Russian actress and dancer
- Olga Lerman (born 1988), Russian stage and film actress
- Olga Limburg (1881–1970), German actress
- Olga Lindo (1899–1968), English actress
- Olga Lounová (born 1981), Czech actress, singer, model and car racer
- Olga Lowe (1919–2013), British actress
- Olga Lomonosova (born 1978), Russian actress and former ballerina
- Olga Lezhneva (born 1983), Ukrainian actress
- Olga Medynich (born 1981), Russian theater and film actress
- Olga Merediz (born 1956), American Broadway, TV, and film actress
- Olga C. Nardone (1921–2010), American actress
- Olga Naumenko (born 1949), Soviet and Russian actress
- Olga Nethersole (1866–1951), English actress and health educator
- Olga Odanović (born 1958), Serbian actress
- Olga Ostroumova (born 1947), Soviet and Russian actress
- Olga Pakalović (born 1978), Croatian actress
- Olga Petrova (1884–1977), British-American actress, screenwriter and playwright
- Olga Preobrazhenskaya (1881–1971), Russian and Soviet actress and film director
- Olga Pogodina (born 1976), Russian actress
- Olga Ponizova (born 1974), Russian theater and film actress
- Olga Safari (born 1993), American actress and model
- Olga San Juan (1927–2009), American actress
- Olga Schoberová (born 1943), Indonesian comedian, actor, TV presenter and singer
- Olga Solbelli (1898–1976), Italian actress
- Olga Sosnovska (born 1972), Polish-British actress
- Olga Segura (born 1986), Mexican actress and producer
- Olga Sjøgren (1884–1960), Norwegian actress
- Olga Spiridonović (1923–1994), Serbian actress
- Olga Svendsen (1883–1942), Danish actress
- Olga Ramos (1918–2005), Spanish musician and actress
- Olga Rakhmanova (1871–1943), Russian actress, married name Olga Sokolova
- Olga von Root (1901–1967), Russian actress and aristocrat
- Olga Vasilyeva (actress) (born 1972), Russian film and stage actress
- Olga Villi (1922–1989), Italian actress
- Olga Volkova (actress) (born 1939), Russian actress
- Olga Wehrly, Irish actor and voiceover artist
- Olga Yakovleva (actress), Russian actress, frequent collaborator of the director Anatoly Efros
- Olga Zhizneva (1899–1972), Soviet actress
- Olga Zubarry (1929–2012), Argentine actress
- Olga Zuiderhoek (born 1946), Dutch actress

== Sportspeople ==
=== Handball players ===
- Olga Adzhiderskaya (born 1982), Kazakhstani handball player
- Olga Akopyan (born 1985), Russian handball player
- Olga Fomina (born 1989), Russian handball player
- Olga Gorshenina (born 1990), Russian handball player
- Olga Laiuk (born 1984), Ukrainian handball player
- Olga Milemba (born 1984), Congolese handball player
- Olga Medvedeva (born 1987), Russian handball player
- Olga Peredery (born 1994), Ukrainian handball player
- Olga Sanko (born 1978), Russian handball player
- Olga Shcherbak (born 1998), Russian handball player
- Olga Tankina (born 1994), Kazakhstani handball player
- Olga Travnikova (born 1970), Kazakhstani handball player

=== Basketball players ===
- Olga Arteshina (born 1982), Russian basketball player
- Olga Barysheva (born 1954), Russian basketball player
- Olga Buryakina (born 1958), Russian basketball player
- Olga Chatzinikolaou (born 1981), Greek basketball player
- Olga Frolkina (born 1997), Russian basketball player
- Olga Firsova (born 1976), American basketball player
- Olga Hrycak (born 1947), Canadian basketball player and coach
- Olga Sokolovskaya (born 1991), Ukrainian-born Russian basketball player
- Olga Vashkevich (born 1988), Belarusian basketball player
- Olga Vigil (born 1970), Cuban basketball player
- Olga Yatskovets (born 1997), Ukrainian basketball player
- Olga Yakovleva (basketball, born 1963), Russian basketball player
- Olga Yakovleva (basketball, born 1986) (died 2010), Russian basketball player
- Olga Yevkova (born 1965), Russian basketball player

=== Chess players ===
- Olga Alexandrova (born 1978), Ukrainian-born Spanish chess player
- Olga Babiy (born 1989), Ukrainian chess player
- Olga Badelka (born 2002), Belarusian chess player
- Olga Dolzhykova, Norwegian-Ukrainian chess player
- Olga Girya (born 1991), Russian chess grandmaster
- Olga Gutmakher (born 1987), Israeli chess player
- Olga Ignatieva (1920–1999), Soviet chess player
- Olga Podrazhanskaya (born 1948), Israeli chess player
- Olga Rubtsova (1909–1994), Soviet chess player
- Olga Sikorová (born 1975), Czech chess player
- Olga Stjazhkina (born 1970), Russian chess player

=== Cyclists ===
- Olga Drobysheva (born 1984), Uzbekistani cyclist
- Olga Hudenko (born 1991), Russian cyclist
- Olga Ismayilova (born 1985), Belarusian-Azerbaijani cyclist
- Olga Shekel (born 1994), Ukrainian cyclist
- Olga Slyusareva (born 1969), Russian cyclist
- Olga Wasiuk (born 1987), Polish cyclist
- Olga Zabelinskaya (born 1980), Russian-born Uzbek cyclist

=== Footballers ===
- Olga Ahtinen (born 1997), Finnish footballer
- Olga Aniskovtseva (born 1982), Belarusian footballer
- Olga Carmona (born 2000), Spanish footballer
- Olga Chernova (born 1997), Russian footballer
- Olga Cușinova (born 1985), Moldovan footballer
- Olga Foma (born 1989), Moldovan footballer
- Olga García (born 1992), Spanish footballer
- Olga Letyushova (born 1975), Russian footballer
- Olga Moreno (born 1979), Spanish footballer
- Olga Novikova (footballer) (born 1977), Belarusian footballer
- Olga Osipyan (born 1995), Armenian footballer
- Olga Petrova (born 1986), Russian footballer
- Olga Poryadina (born 1980), Russian footballer and coach
- Olga San Nicolás, Spanish footballer
- Olga Ševcova (born 1992), Latvian footballer
- Olga Sergaeva (born 1977), Russian footballer
- Olga Svinukhova (born 1969), Russian footballer
- Olga Tanscaia, Moldovan footballer and futsal and women's football referee
- Olga Tshilombo (born 2002), DR Congolese footballer
- Olga Vasilyeva (footballer) (born 1974), former Russian football defender

=== Gymnasts ===
- Olga Bicherova (born 1967), Soviet gymnast
- Olga Belova (rhythmic gymnast), Russian rhythmic gymnast
- Olga Bogdanova (born 1994), Estonian gymnast
- Olga Bumbić (born 1946), Yugoslav gymnast
- Olga Buyanova (born 1954), Russian rhythmic gymnast
- Olga Glatskikh (born 1989), Russian rhythmic gymnast
- Olga Göllner (1930–2017), Romanian gymnast
- Olga Gontar (born 1979), Belarusian rhythmic gymnast
- Olga Kapranova (born 1987), Russian rhythmic gymnast
- Olga Karasyova (1949–2025), Soviet artistic gymnast
- Olga Korbut (born 1955), Belarusian gymnast
- Olga Mostepanova (born 1970), Soviet gymnast
- Olga Munteanu (born 1927), Romanian gymnast
- Olga Rajković (1913–?), Yugoslav gymnast
- Olga Ilina (born 1995), Russian rhythmic gymnast
- Olga Puzhevich (born 1983), Belarusian rhythmic gymnast
- Olga Törös (1914–2015), Hungarian artistic gymnast
- Olga Tass (1929–2020), Hungarian gymnast
- Olga Sherbatykh (born 1988), Ukrainian artistic gymnast
- Olga Strazheva (born 1972), Soviet artistic gymnast
- Olga Yurkina (born 1979), Belarusian artistic gymnast

=== Tennis players ===
- Olga Barabanschikova (born 1979), Belarusian tennis player
- Olga Barbušová, Slovak para table tennis player
- Olga Brózda (born 1986), Polish tennis player
- Olga Danilović (born 2001), Serbian professional tennis player
- Olga Doroshina (born 1994), Russian tennis player
- Olga Fridman (born 1998), Ukrainian-Israeli tennis player
- Olga Glouschenko (born 1978), Belarusian tennis player
- Olga Govortsova (born 1988), Belarusian tennis player
- Olga Hostáková (born 1975), Czech tennis player
- Olga Ianchuk (born 1995), Ukrainian tennis player
- Olga Ivanova (tennis) (born 1977), Russian tennis player
- Olga Kalyuzhnaya (born 1982), Russian tennis player
- Olga Lugina (born 1974), Ukrainian tennis player
- Olga Lazarchuk (born 1981), Ukrainian tennis player
- Olga Montaño, Mexican tennis player
- Olga Morozova (born 1949), USSR (now Russian) tennis player
- Olga Nemeș (born 1968), German table tennis player
- Olga Panova (born 1987), Russian tennis player
- Olga Puchkova (born 1987), Russian tennis player
- Olga Savchuk (born 1987), Ukrainian tennis player
- Olga Sáez Larra (born 1994), Spanish tennis player
- Olga Strashun Weil (1903–1963), American tennis player and golfer
- Olga Tsarbopoulou (born 1968), Greek tennis player
- Olga Votavová (born 1966), Czech tennis player
- Olga Vymetálková (born 1976), Czech tennis player

=== Runners ===
- Olga Appell (born 1963), Mexican-American long-distance runner
- Olga Cristea (born 1987), Moldovan runner
- Olga Dvirna (born 1953), Soviet middle-distance runner
- Olga Escalante (born 1962), Colombian sprinter
- Olga Glok (born 1982), Russian long-distance runner
- Olga Kazi (born 1941), Hungarian middle-distance runner
- Olga Kotlyarova (born 1976), Russian runner
- Olga Kuznetsova (runner) (born 1967), Russian middle-distance runner
- Olga Markova (runner) (born 1968), Russian former long-distance runner
- Olga Nazarova (born 1965) Russian 400 metre runner
- Olga Nelyubova (born 1964), Russian middle-distance runner
- Olga Romanova (athlete) (born 1980), Russian long-distance runner
- Olga Raspopova (born 1978), Russian middle-distance runner
- Olga Yegorova (born 1972), Russian middle-distance runner

=== Skiers ===
- Olga Charvátová (born 1962), Czech alpine skier
- Olga Danilova (born 1970), Russian cross-country skier
- Olga Koroleva (born 1979), Russian freestyle skier
- Olga Kuzyukova (born 1985), Russian cross-country skier
- Olga Lazarenko (born 1980), Russian freestyle skier
- Olga Lychkina (born 1968), Russian freestyle skier
- Olga Mandrika (born 1993), Kazakhstani cross-country skier
- Olga Novikova (orienteer), Kazakhstani ski-orienteer
- Olga Pall (born 1947), Austrian alpine skier
- Olga Reshetkova (born 1982), Kyrgyzstani cross-country skier
- Olga Rocheva (born 1978), Russian cross-country skier
- Olga Polyuk (born 1987), Ukrainian freestyle skier
- Olga Schuchkina (born 1980), Russian cross-country skier
- Olga Seleznyova (born 1975), Kazakhstani cross-country skier
- Olga Shevchenko (born 1979), Russian ski-orienteer
- Olga Vasiljonok (born 1980), Belarusian cross-country skier
- Olga Vedyacheva (born 1970), Kazakhstani alpine skier
- Olha Volkova (born 1986), Ukrainian freestyle skier
- Olga Zavyalova (born 1972), Russian cross-country skier

=== Skaters ===
- Olga Belyakova (born 1988), Russian short track speed skater
- Olga Danilov (born 1973), Israeli Olympic speed skater
- Olga Fatkulina (born 1990), Russian speed skater
- Olga Graf (born 1983), Russian speed skater
- Olga Markova (figure skater) (born 1974), Russian retired figure skater
- Olga Mikutina (born 2003), Ukrainian-Austrian figure skater
- Olga Naidenova (born 1987), Russian figure skater
- Olga Orgonista (1901–1978), Hungarian pair skater
- Olga Orlova (born 1984), Ukrainian figure skater
- Olga Pleshkova (born 1956), Russian speed skater
- Olga Prokuronova (born 1989), Russian pair skater
- Olga Semkina (born 1976), Russian former pair skater
- Olga Szelc (born 1994), Polish figure skater
- Olga Vassiljeva (born 1977), Estonian figure skater

=== Sprinters ===
- Olga Antonova (born 1960), Russian sprinter
- Olga Bogoslovskaya (born 1964), Russian sprinter
- Olga Conte, Argentine sprinter
- Olga Kaidantzi (born 1979), Greek sprinter
- Olga Lenskiy (born 1992), Israeli sprinter
- Olga Kharitonova (born 1990), Russian sprinter
- Olga Mishchenko (born 1971), Ukrainian sprinter
- Olga Mutanda (1967–2014), Ivorian sprinter
- Olga Nazarova (born 1965), Soviet sprinter
- Olga Tereshkova (born 1984), Kazakhstani sprinter
- Olga Zaytseva (born 1984), Russian sprinter

=== Swimmers ===
- Olga de Angulo (1955–2011), Colombian swimmer
- Olga Beresnyeva (born 1985), Ukrainian swimmer
- Olga Brusnikina (born 1978), Russian synchronized swimmer
- Olga Detenyuk (born 1993), Russian swimmer
- Olga Dorfner (1898–1983), American swimmer
- Olga Gnedovskaya (born 1989), Uzbekistani swimmer
- Olga Kirichenko (born 1976), Ukrainian swimmer
- Olga Landik (born 1980), Russian swimmer
- Olga Loizou (born 1961), Cypriot swimmer
- Olga Moltchanova (born 1979), Russian-born Kyrgyz swimmer
- Olga Mukomol (born 1979), Ukrainian swimmer
- Olga Novokshchenova (born 1974), Russian synchronized swimmer
- Olga Hachatryan (born 1992), Turkmenistani swimmer
- Olga Petrusyova (born 1953), Russian swimmer
- Olga Prokhorova (born 1979), Russian swimmer
- Olga Sedakova (synchronized swimmer) (born 1972), Olympic synchronized swimmer competing for Soviet Union and Russia
- Olga Sokolova, represented Russia at the 2012 Summer Paralympics
- Olga Shevchuk, Ukrainian synchronized swimmer
- Olga Sviderska (born 1989), Ukrainian Paralympic swimmer
- Olga Šplíchalová (born 1975), Czech freestyle swimmer
- Olga Titova (born 1980), Kyrgyzstani swimmer
- Olga Vargas (born 1980), Mexican synchronized swimmer
- Olga Vasyukova (born 1980), Russian synchronized swimmer
- Olga Zelenkova, Soviet swimmer

=== Water polo players ===
- Olga Beliaeva (born 1985), Russian water polo player
- Olga Doménech (born 1988), Spanish water polo player
- Olga Gorbunova (born 1993), Russian water polo player
- Olga Leshchuk (born 1971), Russian-born Kazakhstani water polo player
- Olga Turova (born 1983), Russian water polo player

=== Volleyball players ===
- Olga Asato (born 1949), Peruvian volleyball player
- Olga Efimova (born 1990), Russian volleyball player
- Olga Fateeva (born 1984), Russian volleyball player
- Olga Grushko (born 1976), Kazakhstani volleyball player
- Olga Khrzhanovskaya (born 1980), Russian volleyball player
- Olga Nasedkina (born 1982), Kazakhstani volleyball player
- Olga Nikolaeva (born 1972), Russian volleyball player
- Olga Raonić (born 1986), Serbian volleyball player
- Olga Solovova (born 1953), Soviet volleyball player
- Olga Shkurnova (born 1962), Soviet volleyball player
- Olga Shatylo (born 1984), Ukrainian Paralympic volleyball player
- Olga Strantzali (born 1996), Greek volleyball player
- Olga Zhitova (born 1983), Russian volleyball player

=== Other sportspeople ===
- Olga Abramova (born 1988), Ukrainian biathlete
- Olga Akimova (born 1983), Uzbekistani ice dancer
- Olga Andrianova (born 1949), Soviet discus thrower
- Olga Andrianova (curler) (1952–2022), Russian female curler and curling coach
- Olga Arkhangelskaya (born 1981), Russian badminton player
- Olga Anisimova (born 1972), Russian biathlete
- Olga Artamonova (born 1977), Kazakhstani Olympic judoka
- Olga Butkevych (born 1986), Ukrainian-British wrestler
- Olga Cepero (born 1975), Cuban triple jumper
- Olga Chernyavskaya (born 1963), Russian discus thrower
- Olga Desyatskaya (born 1987), Russian sport shooter
- Olga Dmitrieva (born 1981), Russian triathlete
- Olga Dor-Dogadko (born 1976), Israeli track and field athlete
- Olga Dovgun (born 1970), Kazakhstani sports shooter
- Olga Ertlová (born 1986), Czech squash player
- Olga Erofeeva, Russian triathlete
- Olga Fedorovich (born 1992), Belarusian droughts player
- Olga Færseth (born 1975), Icelandic multi-sport athlete
- Olga Fikotová (1932–2024), Czech-American discus thrower
- Olga Gavrilova (1957–2022), Soviet javelin thrower
- Olga Generalova (born 1972), Russian triathlete
- Olga Gere (born 1942), Yugoslav high jumper
- Olga Golovanova (born 1983), Russian snowboarder
- Olga Golovkina (born 1986), Russian athlete
- Olga Grant, Canadian baseball player
- Olga Gyarmati (1924–2013), Hungarian track and field athlete
- Olga Homeghi (born 1958), Romanian rower
- Olga Ivanova (athlete) (born 1979), Russian shot putter
- Olga Ivanova (taekwondo) (born 1993), Russian taekwondo practitioner
- Olga Jekyll (1918–2014), New Zealand fencer
- Olga Jensch-Jordan (1913–2000), German diver
- Olga Jakušina (born 1997), Latvian ice dancer
- Olga Jarkova (born 1979), Russian curler
- Olga Juha (born 1962), Hungarian high jumper
- Olga Kaniskina (born 1985), Russian racewalker
- Olga Kardopoltseva (born 1966), Belarusian racewalker
- Olga Knyazeva (1954–2015), Soviet fencer
- Olga Kevelos (1923–2009), British motorcycle racer
- Olga Kharlan (born 1990), Ukrainian fencer
- Olga Khoroshavtseva (born 1994), Russian freestyle wrestler
- Olga Khristoforova (born 1980), Russian diver
- Olga Kochneva (born 1988), Russian fencer
- Olga Kurban (born 1987), Russian heptathlete
- Olga Kurkulina (born 1971), Israeli high jumper
- Olga Kuzenkova (born 1970), Russian hammer thrower
- Olga Kuznetsova (born 1968), Russian sport shooter
- Olga Kucherenko (born 1985), Russian long jumper
- Olga Levenkova (born 1984), Russian heptathlete
- Olga Liashchuk, Ukrainian strongwoman
- Olga Medvedtseva (born 1975), Russian biathlete
- Olga Melnik (born 1974), Russian biathlete
- Olga Mineyeva (born 1952), Soviet athlete
- Olga Michałkiewicz (born 1994), Polish rower
- Olga Mikhaylova (born 1986), Russian race walker
- Olga Modrachová (1930–1995), Czech athletics competitor
- Olga Moroz (born 1966), Belarusian Olympic archer
- Olga Morozova (badminton) (born 1995), Russian badminton player
- Olga Mullina (born 1992), Russian pole vaulter
- Olga Nazarova (biathlete) (born 1977), Russian-born Belarusian biathlete
- Olga Nazarova (hurdler) (born 1962), Russian hurdler
- Olga Nikitina (born 1998), Russian saber fencer
- Olga Novikova (luger) (born 1973), Russian luger
- Olga Panfyorova (born 1977), Russian race walker
- Olga Permyakova (born 1982), Russian ice hockey defender
- Olga Pershankova (born 1972), Russian ice dancer
- Olga Pilipova (born 1983), Kazakhstani archer
- Olga Podchufarova (born 1992), Russian biathlete
- Olga Pogrebnyak (born 1973), Belarusian sport shooter
- Olga Poltoranina (born 1987), Kazakhstani biathlete
- Olga Roj (born 1989), Belarusian-German badminton player
- Olga Ruyol, Cuban softball player
- Olga Rukavishnikova (born 1955), Soviet pentathlete
- Olga Rubin (born 1989), Israeli mixed martial arts fighter
- Olga Rublyova (born 1974), Russian long jumper
- Olga Ryabinkina (born 1976), Russian shot putter
- Olga Rypakova (born 1984), Kazakhstani athlete
- Olga Samková (born 2005), Czech slalom canoeist
- Olga Savenkova (born 1982), Russian ice hockey player
- Olga Stulneva (born 1983), Russian athlete and bobsledder
- Olga Semenova (born 1973), Russian Paralympic athlete
- Olga Senyuk (born 1991), Moldovan-born Azerbaijani-Ukrainian archer
- Olga Sharkova-Sidorova (born 1968), Russian fencer
- Olga Sharutenko (born 1978), Russian competitive ice dancer
- Olga Shchukina (born 1977), Uzbek shot putter
- Olga Smirnova (wrestler) (born 1979), Russian-born Kazakhstani freestyle wrestler
- Olga Shishigina (born 1968), Kazakhstani hurdler
- Olga Stepanova (born 1986), Russian sport shooter
- Olga Szabó-Orbán (1938–2022), Romanian fencer
- Olga Sosina (born 1992), Russian ice hockey player
- Olga Slapina (born 1966), Soviet canoeist
- Olga Turchak (born 1967), Kazakh high jumper
- Olga Te, Russian weightlifter
- Olga Tratsevskaya (born 1975), Belarusian rower
- Olga Tzavara (1924–2013), Greek sport shooter
- Olga Umaralieva (born 1988), Uzbekistani sprint canoeist
- Olga Velichko (born 1965), Russian fencer
- Olga Vasdeki (born 1973), Greek triple jumper
- Olga Vasilchenko (born 1956), Russian former rower
- Olga Vilukhina (born 1988), Russian biathlete
- Olga Volozhinskaya (born 1962), Soviet ice dancer
- Olga Voshchakina (born 1961), Soviet fencer
- Olga Winterberg (1922–2010), Israeli discus thrower
- Olga Yakusheva (born 1974), Belarusian archer
- Olga Zaitseva (born 1978), Russian biathlete
- Olga Zausaylova (born 1978), Russian triathlete
- Olga Zubova (born 1993), Russian weightlifter

== Artists ==
- Olga de Amaral (born 1932), Colombian textile and visual artist
- Olga Balema, Ukrainian visual artist
- Olga de Blanck (1916–1998), Cuban musical artist
- Olga Costa (1913–1993), Mexican artist
- Olga de Chica (1921–2016), Colombian artist
- Olga Della-Vos-Kardovskaya (1875–1952), Russian artist
- Olga Dondé (1937–2004), Mexican artist
- Olga Fialka (1848–1930), Austro-Hungarian artist
- Olga Gurski (1902–1975), Ukrainian artist
- Olga Gutiérrez (1928–2015), Ecuadorian musical artist
- Olga Herlin (1875–1965), Swedish, first female engraver
- Olga van Iterson-Knoepfle, Dutch artist
- Olga Kisseleva (born 1965), French artist
- Olga Khodataeva (1894–1968), Soviet artist and animator
- Olga Mohr (1905–1955), American artist
- Olga Nunes (born 1979), Canadian musical artist
- Olga Lomaka (born 1982), Russian contemporary artist
- Olga Nyblom (1872–1955), Swedish artist
- Olga Orlova (animator) (1932 - 2022) see Nu, pogodi!
- Olga Pashchenko, Russian musical artist
- Olga Piria (1927–2015), Uruguayan artist, pianist and goldsmith
- Olga Syahputra (1983–2015), Indonesian comedy artist
- Olga Volchkova (born c. 1970), Russian-born artist
- Olga Zhekulina (1900–1973), Russian artist

=== Sculptors ===
- Olga Jančić (1929–2012), Serbian sculptor
- Olga Jevrić (1922–2014), Serbian sculptor
- Olga Koumoundouros (born 1965), American sculptor based in Los Angeles
- Olga Niewska (1898–1943), Polish sculptor
- Olga Rapay-Markish (1929–2012), Ukrainian artist and sculptor

=== Painters ===
- Olga Albizu (1924–2005), American painter
- Olga Andrino, Spanish painter and sculptor
- Olga Beggrow-Hartmann (1862–1922), German-Russian painter
- Olga Bogaevskaya (1915–2000), Russian painter
- Olga Boznańska (1865–1940), Polish painter
- Olga Dormandi (1900–1971), Hungarian painter and children's book illustrator
- Olga Dubeneckienė (1891–1967), Lithuanian and Soviet painter
- Olga Liashenko, Ukrainian German painter
- Olga Lehmann (1912–2001), Chilean-born painter and designer
- Olga Milles (1874–1967), Austrian-born Swedish painter
- Olga Mizgireva (1908–2000), Turkmenistani botanist and painter
- Olga Napoli (1903–1955), Italian painter
- Olga Novo (born 1975), Spanish painter
- Olga Oppenheimer (1886–1941), German painter
- Olga Safronova (born 1991), Kazakhstani painter
- Olga Sacharoff (1889–1967), Spanish painter
- Olga Sinclair, Panamanian painter
- Olga Tsutskova (born 1952), Russian painter
- Olga Rozanova (1886–1918), Russian painter
- Olga Wagner (1873–1963), Danish painter and sculptor
- Olga Wisinger-Florian (1844–1926), Austrian painter

== Writers ==
- Olga ('Olly') Donner (1881–1956), Finnish writer
- Olga Andreyeva Carlisle (born 1930), American novelist
- Oľga Feldeková (1943–2025), Slovak writer
- Olga Flor (born 1968), Austrian writer
- Olga Grau (born 1945), Chilean writer, professor, philosopher
- Olga Grjasnowa (born 1984), German writer
- Olga Grushin (born 1971), Russian-American novelist
- Olga Guirao, Spanish writer
- Olga Harmony (1928–2018), Mexican playwright and drama teacher
- Olga Horak (1926–2024), Slovak-born Australian author and Holocaust survivor
- Olga Huckins, American writer and editor
- Olga Humo (1919–2013), Yugoslav partisan, writer and academic
- Olga Larionova (1935–2023), Russian science fiction writer
- Olga Linek Scholl (1884–1982), Czech-American screenwriter
- Olga Lengyel (1908–2001), Hungarian Holocaust survivor and author
- Olga I. Larkina (born 1954), Russian journalist, publicist and writer
- Olga Martynova (born 1962), Russian-German writer
- Olga Masters (1919–1986), Australian author
- Olga Merino (born 1965), Spanish writer
- Olga Novikoff (1840–1925), Russian writer and journalist
- Olga Orman (1943–2021), Aruban writer and poet
- Olga Ossani (1857–1933), Italian journalist, writer, and women's rights activist
- Olga Ozarovskaya (1874–1933), Russian folklorist, performer, writer
- Olga Printzlau (1891–1962), American screenwriter
- Olga Rautenkranzová (1891–?), Czech director and screenwriter
- Olga Sansom (1900–1989), New Zealand teacher, museum director, botanist, broadcaster, and writer
- Olga Savary (1933–2020), Brazilian writer
- Olga Shapir (1850–1916), Russian writer and feminist
- Olga Slavnikova (born 1957), Russian novelist and literary critic
- Olga Stringfellow (1923–?), New Zealand writer
- Olga Stanisławska (born 1967), Polish writer and freelance journalist
- Olga Tokarczuk (born 1962), Polish writer, activist, and public intellectual
- Olga Wohlbrück (1867–1933), Austrian author and actress
- Olga Xirinacs Díaz (born 1936), Spanish writer and piano teacher
- Olga Zhanibekova (born 1986), Kazakhstani writer

=== Poets ===
- Olga Anstei (1912–1985), Jewish-Ukrainian émigré poet
- Olga Bergholz (1910–1975), Soviet poet
- Olga Broumas (born 1949), Greek poet
- Olga Chyumina (1863–1909), Russian poet and translator
- Olga Elena Mattei (born 1933), Colombian poet
- Olga Gonçalves (1929–2004), Portuguese poet and novelist
- Olga Ivinskaya (1912–1995), Russian poet and writer, Soviet gulag detainee
- Olga Ilyin, Russian-born American poet and novelist
- Olga Nolla (1938–2001), Puerto Rican poet, professor and journalist
- Olga Orozco (1920–1999), Argentine poet
- Olga Ravn (born 1986), Danish poet and novelist
- Olga Sedakova (poet) (born 1949), Russian poet

=== Journalists ===
- Olga Luzardo (1916–2016), Venezuelan journalist and activist
- Olga Meyer (1930–2018), Norwegian journalist and radio host
- Olga Rodríguez (born 1975), Spanish journalist and author
- Olga Romanova (born 1966), television and newspaper journalist, opposition activist
- Olga Rudenko, Ukrainian journalist
- Olga Slivková (1936–2024), Slovak journalist
- Olga Viza (born 1958), Spanish journalist
- Olga Volkenstein (1875 –942), Russian journalist, suffragist and a leader of the women's rights movement

== Musicians ==
- Olga Athaide Craen, Indian pianist
- Olga Bell (born Olga Balashova, 1983), American musician
- Olga Bloom (1919–2011), American violinist and violist
- Olga Gorelik, Belarusian-born American pianist
- Olga Hegedus (1920–2017), English cellist
- Olga Jegunova (born 1984), Latvian classical pianist
- Olga Kern (born 1975), Russian pianist
- Olga Konkova (born 1969), Norwegian-Russian jazz pianist
- Olga Pierri (1914–2016), Uruguayan guitarist and teacher
- Olga Radke, Lutheran church worker and musician, helped run the Hermannsburg Choir, Australia, in the 1960s
- Olga Rotari (born 1989), Moldovan classical musician
- Olga Rudge (1895–1996), American violinist
- Olga Samaroff (1880–1948), American pianist
- Olga Scheps (born 1986), German pianist
- Olga Schwind (1887–1979), German musician
- Olga Shishkina (musician) (born 1985), Russian-born musician
- Olga Zilboorg (1933–2017), Mexican-American musician

=== Composers ===
- Olga Kholodnaya, Russian violinist, composer, arranger and producer
- Olga Hans (born 1971), Polish composer and music educator
- Olga Neuwirth (born 1968), Austrian composer

=== Singers ===
- Olga Arefieva (born 1966), Russian singer-songwriter
- Olga Averino (1895–1989), Russian opera singer
- Olga Avigail Mieleszczuk, Polish-Israeli singer in Yiddish
- Olga Bezsmertna (born 1983), Ukrainian operatic soprano
- Olga Borodina (born 1963), Russian opera singer
- Olga Björkegren (1857–1950), Swedish opera singer
- Olga Busuioc, Moldovan soprano
- Olga Buzova (born 1986), Russian media personality and singer
- Olga Cybulskaya (born 1985), Ukrainian singer
- Olga Glazova (born 1993), Russian singer
- Olga Guillot (1922–2010), Cuban singer
- Olga Jackowska (1951–2018), Polish vocalist and songwriter
- Olga Kormukhina (born 1960), Russian singer
- Olga Kulchynska, Ukrainian soprano opera singer
- Olga Lagrange-Gerlach (1874–1949), German opera singer
- Olga Meganskaya (born 1992), Russian singer, model and former member of Ukrainian girl group Nu Virgos
- Olga Mykytenko (born 1974), Ukrainian opera singer
- Olga Orlova (singer) (born 1977), Russian singer, founding member of Blestyashchiye
- Olga Olgina (1904–1979), Polish opera singer and teacher
- Olga Peretyatko (born 1980), Russian operatic soprano
- Olya Polyakova (born 1979), Ukrainian singer, actress and TV host
- Olga Praguer Coelho (1909–2008), Brazilian folk singer and guitarist
- Olga "Dark Princess" Romanova, former lead singer of the Gothic metal band Dark Princess
- Olga Romanovskaya (born 1986), Ukrainian singer, television presenter, fashion designer and model
- Olga Seryabkina (born 1985), Russian singer
- Olga Simzis, Russian opera singer
- Olga Souza (born 1968), Brazilian singer
- Olga Tañón (born 1967), Puerto Rican singer
- Olga von Türk-Rohn, Austrian soprano and voice teacher
- Olga Wilhelmine Munding (born 1976), American singer-songwriter
- Olga Vitalevna Yakovleva, or Origa (1970–2015), Russian singer
- Olga Voronets (1926–2014), Russian folk music singer

== Scientists ==
- Olga Aikala (1883–1962), Finnish horologist
- Olga Boudker, American scientist and academic
- Olga Bogdanova (1896–1982), Soviet chemist
- Olga Dahl (1917–2009), Swedish genealogist
- Olga Dudko, Ukrainian physicist and academic
- Olga Dontsova (born 1959), Russian scientist
- Olga Ehrenhaft-Steindler (1879–1933), Austrian physicist
- Olga Evdokimov, Russian physicist
- Olga Fassatiová (1924–2011), Czech mycologist
- Olga Freidenberg (1890–1955), Russian philosopher
- Olga May Goss, Australian plant pathologist
- Olga D. González-Sanabria, Puerto Rican scientist
- Olga Guramishvili-Nikoladze (1855–1940), Georgian biologist and educator
- Olga Hartman (1900–1974), American invertebrate zoologist
- Olga Hudlická (1926–2014), Czech-born English physiologist
- Olga Kennard (1924–2023), Hungarian-born British crystallographer
- Olga Kocharovskaya, American physicist
- Olga Korosteleva, Russian-American statistician
- Olga Lepeshinskaya (biologist) (1871–1963), Soviet biologist
- Olga F. Linares (1936–2014), Panamanian-American academic anthropologist and archaeologist
- Olga Loseva (born 1954), Russian musicologist
- Olga Martín-Belloso (born 1960), Spanish food scientist
- Olga García Mancheño, Spanish organic chemistry professor
- Olga Malinkiewicz (born 1982), Polish physicist and inventor
- Olga Najera-Ramirez (born 1955), American anthropologist
- Olga Ornatsky, Canadian scientist
- Olga Onuch, political scientist
- Olga Pendleton, American statistician
- Olga Plümacher (1839–1895), Swiss-American philosopher and scholar
- Olga Russakovsky, Ukrainian computer scientist
- Olga Shishkina (physicist) (born 1988), Russian physicist
- Olga Smirnova (scientist) (born 1973), Russian physicist
- Olga Sorkine-Hornung, Soviet-born Israeli computer scientist
- Olga Speranskaya, Russian scientist and environmentalist
- Olga Troyanskaya, American academic
- Olga Umnova, British academic
- Olga Tufnell (1905–1985), British archaeologist
- Olga Ulyanova (1922–2011), Russian scientist and niece of Vladimir Lenin
- Olga Vinogradova (1929–2001), Russian neuroscientist
- Olga Vitek, American biostatistician and computer scientist
- Olga Zolina (born 1975), Russian meteorologist

=== Botanists ===
- Olga Fedchenko (1845–1921), Russian botanist, explorer and artist
- Olga Knorring (1887–1978), Russian botanist
- Olga Korhoven Lakela (1890–1980), Finnish-American botanist and educator
- Olga Kuzeneva (1887–1978), Russian botanist
- Olga Kuzeneva (1887–1978), Russian botanist
- Olga Herrera-MacBryde (1937–2007), Ecuadorian-American botanist and international conservationist
- Olga Stewart (1920–1998), Scottish botanist and botanical artist

=== Mathematicians ===
- Olga Bondareva (1937–1991), Soviet mathematician and economist
- Olga Gil Medrano (born 1956), Spanish mathematician
- Olga Holtz (born 1973), Russian mathematician
- Olga Hadžić (1946–2019), Serbian mathematician
- Olga Hahn-Neurath (1882–1937), Austrian mathematician and philosopher
- Olga Kharlampovich (born 1960), Canadian mathematician
- Olga Ladyzhenskaya (1922–2004), Russian mathematician
- Olga Oleinik (1925–2001), Russian mathematician
- Olga Taussky-Todd (1906–1995), Austrian-American mathematician
- Olga Tsuberbiller (1885–1975), Russian mathematician

=== Doctors ===
- Olga Aleinikova (born 1951), Russian physician
- Olga Avilova (1918–2009), Ukrainian surgeon
- Olga Imerslund (1907–1987), Norwegian pediatrician
- Olga Jonasson (1934–2006), American transplant surgeon
- Olga Povitzky, American physician
- Olga Uvarov (1910–2001), Russian surgeon and researcher

== Dancers ==
- Olga Fricker (1902–1997), Canadian-born dancer, educator and choreographer
- Olga Grishenkova, Russian ballet dancer
- Olga Khokhlova (1891–1955), Russian-Ukrainian model and dancer
- Olga Pericet, Spanish flamenco and contemporary dancer
- Olga Roriz (born 1955), Portuguese choreographer and dancer

=== Ballet dancers ===
- Olga Esina, Russian ballet dancer
- Olga Lepeshinskaya (dancer), (1916–2008), Soviet ballerina
- Olga Moiseeva, (1928–2021), Soviet and Russian ballerina and teacher
- Olga Preobrajenska (1871–1962), Russian ballerina
- Olga Sandberg (1844–1926), Swedish ballerina
- Olga Sapphire (1907–1981), Russian-Japanese ballerina and choreographer
- Olga Smirnova (dancer) (born 1991), Russian ballet dancer
- Olga Spessivtseva (1895–1991), Russian ballet dancer

== Activists ==
- Olga Bancic (1912–1944), Jewish Romanian communist activist
- Olga Bianchi, Latin American pacifist and human rights activist
- Olga Hankin (1852–1942), Belarusian-Israeli midwife and activist
- Olga Kovalkova (born 1984), Belarusian activist
- Olga Murray (1925–2024), American lawyer and activist
- Olga Oinola (1865–1949), Finnish suffragette and President of the Finnish Women Association
- Olga Pilatskaya, Russian activist
- Olga Plakhotnik, Ukrainian feminist
- Olga Poblete (1908–1999), women's rights activist in Chile
- Olga Lopes-Seale (1918–2011), Guyanese radio personality and activist
- Olga Quiñones Fernández (1940–2014), Spanish lawyer and feminist
- Olga Ramos (activist) (1962–2022), Venezuelan activist, professor and researcher
- Olga Segerberg, Swedish photographer and suffragist
- Olga Talamante (born 1950), American activist

=== Revolutionaries and separatists ===
- Olga Ban, Yugoslav partisan
- Olga Kachura (1970–2022), Ukrainian separatist military officer
- Olga Kameneva (1883–1941), Russian Bolshevik revolutionary
- Olga Levashova (1837–1905), Russian revolutionary
- Olga Lyubatovich (1853–1917), Russian revolutionary
- Olga Makeeva (born 1974), Ukrainian lawyer and separatist

== Linguists ==
- Olga Blinova (1930–2020), Russian linguist
- Olga Fischer (born 1951), Dutch linguist
- Olga Kapeliuk (born 1932), Israeli linguist
- Olga Sirotinina (1923–2025), Russian linguist
- Olga Stolbova, Soviet and Russian linguist

== Educators ==
- Olga Chupris (born 1969), Belarusian law professor and administrator
- Olga Cossettini (1898–1987), Argentine teacher, educator and pedagogue
- Olga Fernández Latour de Botas (1935–2025), Argentine educator, folklorist, historian and writer
- Olga Fierz (1900–1990), Swiss teacher and translator
- Olga Fiorini (1927–2022), Italian businesswoman and educator
- Olga Palagia (born 1949), Professor of Classical Archaeology
- Olga Ross Hannon (1890–1947), American art professor and instructor

== Other people ==
- Olga Álava (born 1988), Ecuadorian model, social, lifestyle entrepreneur, environmentalist and beauty queen
- Olga Alkalaj (1907–1942), Yugoslav communist leader
- Olga Antonetti (1944–1968), Venezuelan beauty queen
- Olga Arlauskas (born 1981), Russian—Spanish filmmaker and film director
- Olga Dmitrievna Bagalei-Tatarinova (1889–1942), Ukrainian historian, archivist, bibliographer and librarian
- Olga Benário Prestes (1908–1942), German-Brazilian communist militant
- Olga Bordashevskaya (1919–2002), soldier in the Red Army during World War II
- Olga Briscorn, Russian serial killer
- Olga Bulbenkova (1835–1918), Russian fashion designer
- Olga Celeste (1888–1969), American animal trainer
- Olga Clark (1898–1994), Russian socialite
- Olga E. Custodio, U.S. Air Force officer
- Olga Dergunova (born 1965), Russian businessperson
- Olga Erteszek (1916–1989), Polish-American undergarment designer and lingerie company owner
- Olga FitzRoy, British sound engineer and campaigner
- Olga Gray (1906–1990), British secretary, typist and MI5 infiltration agent
- Olga di Grésy (1900–1994), Italian fashion designer
- Olga Havlová (1933–1996), Czech dissident and activist, Václav Havel's first wife
- Olga Hepnarová (1951–1975), Czech mass murderer
- Olya Ivanisevic (born 1988), Serbian fashion model
- Olga Koch (born 1992), Russian-born British stand-up comedian
- Olga Kudeshkina, Russian judge
- Olga Loera (born 1980), Mexican-American glamour model
- Olga Lucovnicova, Moldovan film director and cinematographer
- Olga Madar (1915–1996), American trade unionist
- Olga Mata, Venezuelan woman detained for publishing a humorous TikTok video
- Olga Máté (1878–1961), Hungarian photographer
- Olga Michael (1916–1979), American saint
- Olga Miller (1920–2003), Australian historian and Aboriginal elder
- Olga Paredes (born 1984), Bolivian architect and Wikimedian
- Olga Petit (1870–1966), French lawyer
- Olga Pikhienko (born 1980), Russian circus performer
- Olga Polizzi, British hotelier and interior designer
- Olga Raggio (1925–2009), American art historian
- Olga Rutterschmidt (born 1933), American murderer of two homeless men for life insurance money
- Olga Sanfirova (1917–1944), Soviet military aviator
- Olga San Juan (1927–2009), American actress and comedian
- Olga Skabeyeva (born 1984), Russian TV host and political commentator, described as propagandist
- Olga Smorodskaya (born 1956), Russian sports executive
- Olga Taratuta (1876–1938), Ukrainian anarchist
- Olga Uskova (born 1964), Russian entrepreneur
- Olga Venecia Herrera Carbuccia (born 1956), Dominican jurist

== Fictional people ==
- Olga, a sister of the messenger Barnabas in Franz Kafka's unfinished novel The Castle
- Olga, a.k.a. Olgariki, in the Russian animated children's television series GoGoRiki
- Olga in Neighbours From Hell 2: On Vacation, who is Mr Rottweiler's love interest
- Olga Marie Animusphere in the Japanese mobile game Fate/Grand Order
- Olga Astronominov, also known as Lalavava, the younger sister of Mandark in the American animated television series Dexter's Laboratory
- Teto Ollga (Auntie Olga), in the 1976 Albanian comedy film The Lady from the City, portrayed by Violeta Manushi
- Olga da Polga, a fictional Guinea pig the subject of a book series by Michael Bond
- Olga Fitzgerald in series 10 of the British television programme Waterloo Road, portrayed by Pooky Quesnel
- Olga Gurlukovich in Metal Gear Solid 2: Sons of Liberty
- Olga Montenegro, a character from the Philippine action drama series FPJ's Batang Quiapo
- Olga Orly in Apollo Justice: Ace Attorney
- Olga Pataki, the older sister of Helga Pataki in the American animated television series Hey Arnold!
- Olga Sergeyevna Prozorova in the Russian play Three Sisters by Anton Chekhov
- Olga "meat" Romanova is a general of "The Volk" in the Crackdown video game series

== See also ==
- Olga (disambiguation)
- Olja, Olha, Olya, Volha, other similar given names
