= Olja =

Olja is a feminine given name and nickname. It may refer to:

== Given name ==
- Olja Bećković (born 1964), Serbian journalist, actress and television presenter
- Olja Ivanjicki (1931–2009), Serbian painter, sculptor and poet
- Olja Knežević (born 1968), Croatia-based Montenegrin novelist
- Olja Petrović (politician) (born 1990), Serbian politician
- Olja Savičević (born 1974), Croatian novelist, poet and playwright

== Nickname ==
- Olivera Ćirković (born 1969), Serbian writer, painter, former convicted jewel thief and former basketball player and administrator
- Ognjen Petrović (1948–2000), Serbian football goalkeeper

== See also ==
- Olga, Olha, Olya, Volha, other similar given names
