= Nyblom =

Nyblom is a surname. Notable people with the name include:

- Anders Nyblom (born 1981), Danish wrestler
- Håkan Nyblom (born 1981), Danish wrestler, twin brother of Anders
- Helena Nyblom (1843–1926), Swedish children's writer
- Olga Nyblom (1872–1955), Swedish artist
