= Volha =

- Gender: Female
- Language: Belarusian

Origin
- Origin: Old Norse
- Meaning: "holy", "blessed"

Other names
- Related names: Olga, Helga

Volha (Belarusian: Вольга) is a feminine Belarusian given name, a variation of the name Olga (Olha). It can also be a Ukrainian surname (Ukrainian: Волга).

Notable people with the name include:

== Given name ==
- Volha Aniskoutsava (born 1982), Belarusian footballer
- Volha Badelka (born 2002), Belarusian chess player
- Volha Berazniova (born 1980), Belarusian rower
- Volha Dubouskaya (born 1983), Belarusian long-distance runner
- Volha Hapeyeva (born 1982), Belarusian poet, writer, translator, and linguist
- Volha Harbunova (born 1981), Belarusian women's rights organiser and trainer
- Volha Havartsova (born 1988), Belarusian tennis player
- Volha Hayeva (born 1982), Belarusian road cyclist
- Voĺha Karač (born 1979), Belarusian journalist, public figure, and politician
- Volha Kavalkova (born 1984), Belarusian activist and dissident
- Volha Khilko (born 1979), Belarusian wrestler
- Volha Khizhynkova (born 1986), Belarusian journalist, pageant contestant and model
- Volha Khudzenka (born 1992), Belarusian sprint canoeist
- Volha Klimava (born 1995), Belarusian sprint canoeist
- Volha Krautsova (born 1981), Belarusian long-distance runner
- Volha Martynava (born 1981), the birth name of Belarusian poet Valzhyna Mort
- Volha Masiukovich (born 1992), Belarusian track cyclist
- Volha Mazuronak (born 1989), Belarusian long-distance runner and racewalker
- Volha Padabed (born 1979), Belarusian basketball player
- Volha Samusik (1985–2010), Belarusian rock singer and journalist
- Volha Silkina (born 1995), Belarusian modern pentathlete
- Volha Sudarava (born 1984), Belarusian long jumper
- Volha Talayeva (born 1987), Belarusian short track speed skater
- Volha Tratseuskaya (born 1975), Belarusian rower
- Volha Tsander (born 1976), Belarusian hammer thrower
- Volha Yarmolenka, known as Alesya, Belarusian singer
- Volha Zinkevich (born 1975), Belarusian paralympic athlete
- Volha Ziuzkova (born 1983), Belarusian basketball player

== Surname ==
- Vasyl Volha (born 1968), Ukrainian politician
