= Olha =

Olha is a Ukrainian feminine given name related to Olga. Volha is a Belarusian variant. Notable people with the name include:

- Olha Basanska (born 1992), Ukrainian footballer
- Olha Basarab (1889–1924), Ukrainian political activist and alleged spy
- Olha Bibik (born 1990), Ukrainian sprinter
- Olha Bohomolets (born 1966), Ukrainian physician, singer and songwriter
- Olha Bura (1986–2014), Ukrainian activist
- Olha Franko (1896–1987), Ukrainian cookbook author
- Olha Freimut (born 1982), Ukrainian TV presenter, journalist, writer and model
- Olha Kobylianska (1863–1942), Ukrainian writer and feminist
- Olha Kosach (1849–1930), pen name Olena Pchilka, Ukrainian publisher, writer, ethnographer, interpreter and civil activist
- Olha Kuryshko (born 1988), Ukrainian politician
- Olha Lyakhova (born 1992), Ukrainian middle-distance runner
- Olha Ovdiychuk (born 1993), Ukrainian footballer
- Olha Rozshchupkina (born 1984), Ukrainian former artistic gymnast
- Olha Saladukha (born 1983), Ukrainian former triple jumper
- Olha Skrypak (born 1990), Ukrainian long-distance runner
- Olha Stefanishyna (born 1985), Ukrainian lawyer and civil servant
- Olha Sumska (born 1966), Ukrainian actress
- Olha Zubaryeva (born 1958), Ukrainian handball player

== See also ==
- Olja, a given name and nickname
