= Olga Lomaka =

Russian contemporary artist

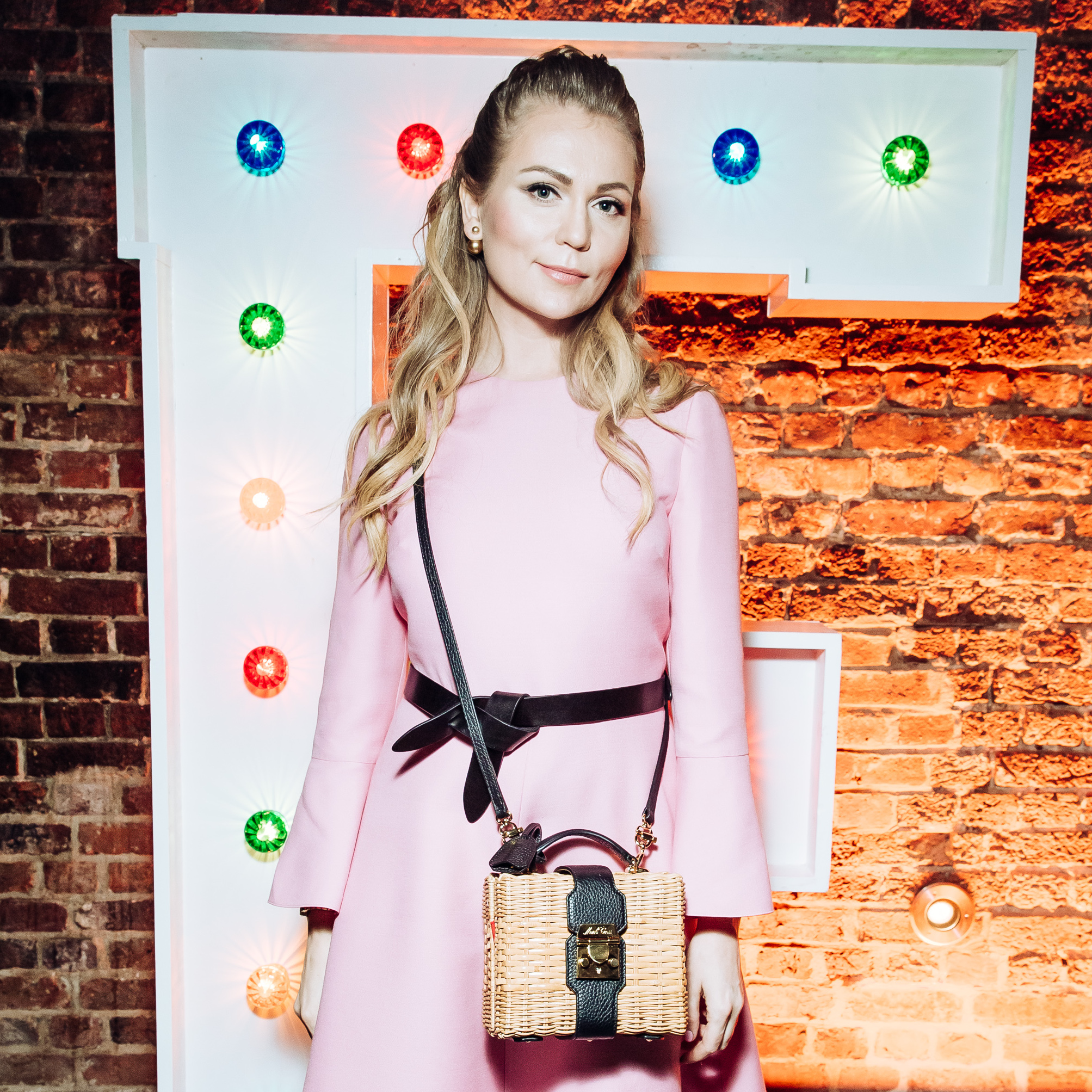
- Olga Lomaka, 2017
- Born: September 10, 1982 (age 43); Krasnodar, Russia
- Education: MGIMO; Loyola University Chicago; Central Saint Martins; Camberwell College of Arts
- Occupations: contemporary artist gallerist curator
- Movement: Pop Art
- Website: www.olgalomaka.com

Olga Lomaka (born September 10, 1982) is a Russian gallerist, contemporary artist, and curator. Her style is known for working primarily within the pop-art movement, combining diverse materials and techniques in her pieces. Lomaka is actively exhibiting worldwide, participating in global art-fairs and biennales. She was named the Best Artist of the Year and won The Annual Award at the Aurora European Awards in Moscow in 2014. She was also awarded the title Fashion Artist of the Year by the Fashion TV Channel in Moscow in 2013.

== Early life and education ==
Olga Lomaka was born in Krasnodar, Russia. At a young age her family moved to Moscow, where she grew up and spent her childhood. Lomaka moved to the United States in 1999 to continue her higher education and pursue her career. In 2002, she completed painting courses at Loyola University Chicago. In 2004 she graduated with honors from the George Mason University, Virginia, with a Business Administration degree. A decade later Lomaka moved to London to pursue her interests in art further and established her studio residency in Chelsea. She continued her education in Fine Art at Central Saint Martins and graduated with a BA in Painting from Camberwell College of Arts in 2015, later that year she completed art-business courses at Sotheby’s University of London. In 2017, Lomaka opened Lomaka Gallery in London, a contemporary art space that specializing in featuring emerging artists from all over the world.

== Creative career ==
As an artist, Lomaka is recognised for her pop art style. Within the realms of pop-art, Lomaka examines issues concerning the evolution of social mindfulness, influence of contemporary trends on traditional values, relationships between the sexes and psychological dependence of one’s self esteem on pre-existing stereotypes. At the core of her work is a blend of global social phenomena and fundamental existential questions. Lomaka experiments with new techniques such as carving and aerography. She mixes traditional materials with modern media.

Viewers can often find images of famous people in her artworks such as Jude Law, Anna Dello Russo, Karl Lagerfeld, and Naomi Campbell. In October 2016, Lomaka presented an installation dedicated to the 90th birthday of Queen Elizabeth II for her solo show “Artefacts” at Saatchi Gallery in London.

Lomaka’s works can be found in 25 Kadr Gallery Foundation (Moscow), Contemporary Art Center «M17» (Kyiv), Loyola University Foundation (Chicago), Erarta Museum (St.Petersburg) as well as in private collections such as Pierre Cardin’s Foundation.

From 2014 to 2016 she launched her own TV show Art & Fashion with Olga Lomaka on World Fashion Channel, and hosted many guests of the cultural world like Hubert de Givenchy, fashion designer and founder The House of Givenchy, Claire Wilcox, curator of Victoria & Albert Museum, Bernard Blistène, curator of Centre Pompidou and Marta Ruiz del Árbol, curator of Museo Thyssen-Bornemisza.

In 2015, Lomaka launched limited-edition sweatshirts featuring prints from a series of her paintings, Mind Parasites. She has also collaborated with Vogue Fashion Night Out by producing a new collection, Mickey’s Evolution.

In 2017, she founded Lomaka Gallery set in the heart of London's Fitzrovia. Lomaka Gallery is a contemporary art space that collaborates with artists working today. It welcomes a broad audience to an exhibition programme, supporting work of a group of artists who collectively defy categorization.

== Solo exhibitions ==
- Pink Magic, The Hellenic Centre, London, 2018
- Artefacts, Saatchi Gallery, London, 2016
- Artefacts, 25 Kadr Gallery, Moscow, 2016
- The Mind Parasites, Contemporary Art Center M17, Kyiv, 2015
- The Mind Parasites, Erarta Gallery, London, 2015
- SOS.OK, Contemporary Art Center M17, Kyiv, 2013
- SOS.OK, Zeppelin Gallery, Moscow, 2013
- SOS.OK, ASC Gallery, London, 2013
- Anahata, ASC Gallery, London, 2013
- Trip to Ecstasy, Wild Gallery, Paris, 2011
- Nerves, 25 Kadr Gallery, Moscow, 2010
- Girls Went Wild, Zenith Gallery, Washington, DC, 2004
- Saint, LUMA Gallery, Chicago, 2002

== Selected group exhibitions ==
- 2017 — Biennale Internazionale Mantova, Diocesan Museum Francesco Gonzaga, Mantova
- 2017 — XI Florence Biennale, Fortezza da Basso, Florence
- 2017 — «Premio Combat Prize 2017», Eighth Edition, Museo Civico G. Fattori, Livorno
- 2017 — Festival d'Arts chez Pierre Cardin, Lacoste, France
- 2017 — «Affordable Art Fair 2017», Hampstead, London
- 2017 — «Edition I», Lomaka Gallery, London
- 2016 — «Art Monaco 2016», Espace Fontvieille, Monte-Carlo
- 2016 — The Art Marathon, IZO Art Gallery, Moscow
- 2016 — Russian Art Week, XX International Art Fair, The Central House of Artists, Moscow
- 2016 — «ART.WHO.ART» V Edition, Park Mira, Moscow
- 2015 — IV Exhibition-Auction, MGIMO, Moscow
- 2015 — «LITART», Depre Art Space, Moscow
- 2015 — Degree Show, Camberwell College of Arts, London
- 2014 — III Exhibition-Auction, MGIMO, Moscow
- 2014 — «Circular», Forge Gallery, London
- 2014 — «Aurora», Cosmos Pavilion, Moscow
- 2014 — «UNIT», Dilston Grove Gallery, London
- 2014 — Diamond Auction, Le Sporting Salle Des Etoi Less, Monaco
- 2013 — «Re-Ups», Cultivate Gallery, London
- 2013 — CRASH SALON, Charlie Dutton Gallery, London
- 2013 — End of 1st Year Show, Camberwell College of Arts, London
- 2012 — Open Exhibition, Peckham Space Gallery, London
- 2012 — Exhibition «0/2», Holiday Art Market, Moscow
- 2011 — «Young Generation», Wild Gallery, Paris
- 2009 — Exhibition «0/1», 25 Kadr Gallery, Moscow
- 2004 — «BEST 04», Fine Arts Galleries at GMU, Fairfax, VA
- 2003 — Group Show, George Mason University, Fairfax, VA
- 2003 — «Crave», Wilson Center Gallery, Washington, DC
- 2002 — Summer Show, Loyola University, Chicago

== Awards ==
- Painting Nominee, 1st Premio Arte Milano, Milan, 2017
- Best Contemporary Artist 2017, by VV Magazine, Phillips Auction House, London 2017
- Le Prix d’excellence Pensé Écologique», Art Monaco 2016, Monte-Carlo
- First Prize, Sculpture Nominee», Russian Art Week, XX International Art Fair, Moscow, 2016
- Best Art Programme of the Year, by Fashion TV Channel, Moscow, 2015
- The Best Artist of the Year, The Annual Award by Aurora European Awards, Moscow, 2014
- 2014 — «The Best Artist of the Year», The Annual Awards by Top 25 Diamond Companies & Persons, St. Petersburg
- 2013 — «Fashion Artist of the Year» by Fashion TV Channel, Moscow
