= Olga Pircher =

Austrian politician (born 1952)

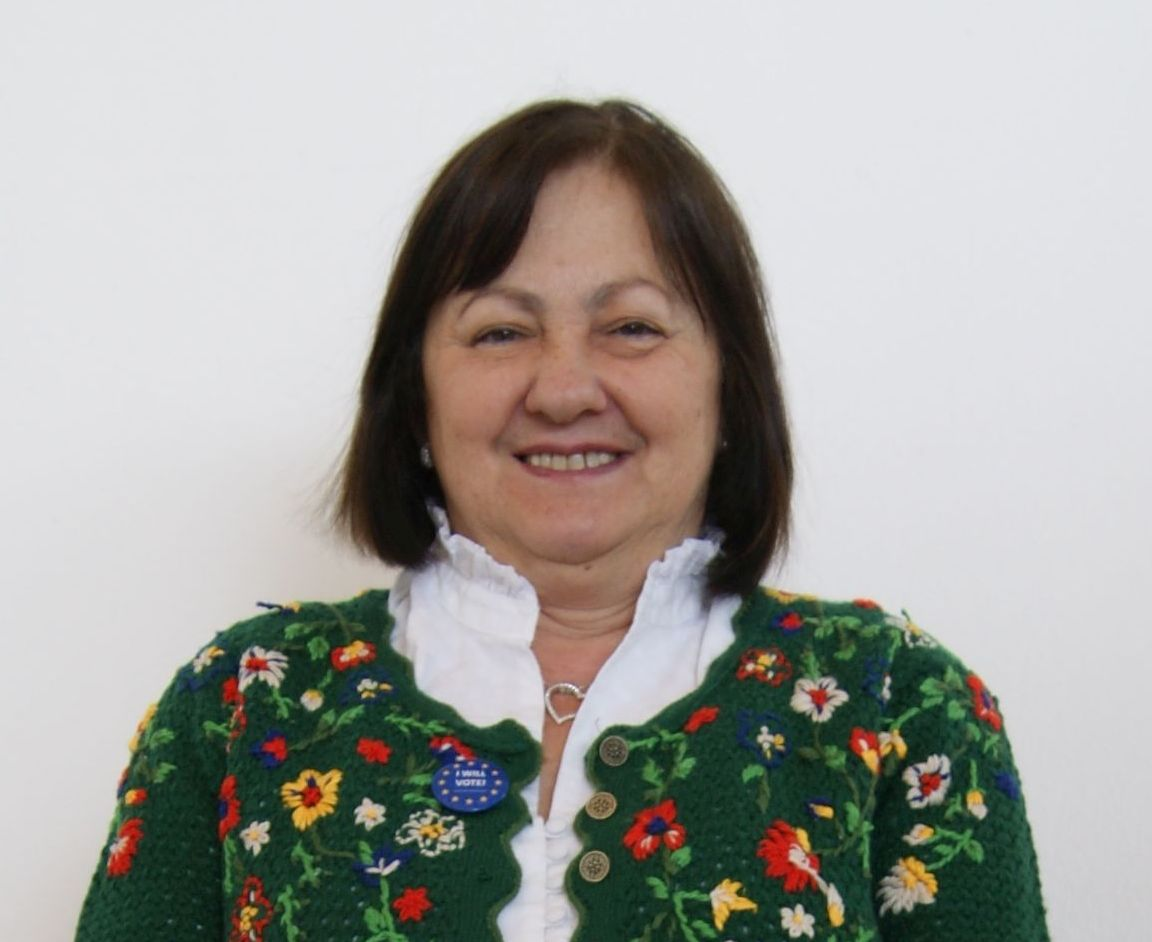

Landesrat of Vorarlberg
- In office 31 January 2001 – 13 October 2009

Personal details
- Born: 7 October 1952 (age 73) Leoben, Styria, Austria
- Party: ÖVP

Olga Sonja Barbara Pircher (née Haidinger; born 7 October 1952) is an Austrian politician. A member of the Social Democratic Party, she served as a Landesrat of Vorarlberg from 2001 to 2009.

== Politics ==
From 2003 to 2015, Pircher was state chairwoman of the SPÖ women in Vorarlberg. Other functions she held were that of deputy state party chairwoman, was a member of the state and federal party executive committees, as well as president of Sozialistische Bodensee-Internationale and a member of the Lake Constance Council. On 31 January 2001, she succeeded Helmut Zimmermann in the Vorarlberg state parliament, where she remained until 13 October 2009. From November 2013 to March 2017, she was the district chair of the SPÖ district of Bludenz. She is a member of the cultural committee of the city of Bludenz and chairwoman of the Bludenz adult education center association.

== Personal life ==
Pircher lives in Bludenz and has been married since 1972. She moved from Styria to Vorarlberg in 1977 and is the mother of three children.
