= Olga Quiñones Fernández =

Spanish lawyer and feminist

Olga Quiñones Fernández (Salinas (Castrillón), Asturias, 1940 - Valencia, 6 June 2014) was a Spanish lawyer and feminist, who was a professor at the University of Valencia. In 1985, she was the first president of the Valencian School Board. She was vice president of the Association of University Women (1974–76), and maintained contact with the feminist movement for life. In 2012, she received the "Dona Commitment in Les Politiques d'Igualtat" Prize from Dones Progressistes for her work, and her commitment to equality policies.
