= Olga Kuzeneva =

Russian botanist (1887–1978)

Olga Iakinfovna Kuzeneva (1887–1978) was a Russian botanist who specialized in conifers. She identified at least five species. The standard author abbreviation Kuzen. is used to indicate this person as the author when citing a botanical name.
