= Olga Dontsova =

Russian scientist

Olga Anatolyevna Dontsova
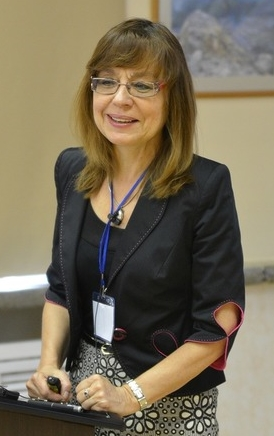
- Born: 7 January 1959; Moscow, Russia (formerly USSR)
- Education: Moscow State University
- Known for: Ribosomology
- Awards: 1999 European Academy Prize for Young Scientists; 2016 RAS Academician
- Scientific career
- Fields: Chemical biology Molecular biology
- Workplaces: Russian Academy of Sciences; Moscow State University

Olga Anatolyevna Dontsova (born January 7, 1959) is a Russian biochemist and an academician at the Russian Academy of Sciences. Her research interests include: structure and functions of RNA-containing cellular machines, functional properties and mechanisms of regulation of Telomerase Ribonucleoprotein particle (RNP) complexes and non-coding RNAs.

== Education and work ==
In 1991 she defended her Ph.D. from the Chemistry Department of Moscow State University and in 1997 her doctoral dissertation development of chemical methods for studying the structure and function of complex ribonucleoprotein systems was published. Since 1999 she is the professor of Bio-organic chemistry, Department of Chemistry of Natural Compounds at Faculty of Chemistry, Moscow State University.

She is the member of the Russian Foundation for Basic Research Board.

== Selected bibliography ==
=== Articles ===
- Sergiev, Petr V.; Artemov, Artem A.; Prokhortchouk, Egor B.; Dontsova, Olga A.; Berezkin, Grigory V. (7 February 2016). "Genomes of Strongylocentrotus franciscanus and Lytechinus variegatus: are there any genomic explanations for the two order of magnitude difference in the lifespan of sea urchins?". Aging. 8 (2): 260–271. doi:10.18632/aging.100889. PMC 4789581. PMID 26851889.
- Kubarenko, Andrew; Sergiev, Petr; Wintermeyer, Wolfgang; Dontsova, Olga; Rodnina, Marina V. (17 November 2006). "Involvement of Helix 34 of 16 S rRNA in Decoding and Translocation on the Ribosome". Journal of Biological Chemistry. 281 (46): 35235–35244. doi:10.1074/jbc.M608060200. hdl:11858/00-001M-0000-002D-2277-7. PMID 16990269. S2CID 21634765.
- Bugaeva, EY; Surkov, S; Golovin, AV; Ofverstedt, LG; Skoglund, U; Isaksson, LA; Bogdanov, AA; Shpanchenko, OV; Dontsova, OA (December 2009). "Structural features of the tmRNA-ribosome interaction". RNA. 15 (12): 2312–20. doi:10.1261/rna.1584209. PMC 2779675. PMID 19861420.
- Dontsova, O; Tishkov, V; Dokudovskaya, S; Bogdanov, A; Döring, T; Rinke-Appel, J; Thamm, S; Greuer, B; Brimacombe, R (10 May 1994). "Stem-loop IV of 5S rRNA lies close to the peptidyltransferase center". Proceedings of the National Academy of Sciences of the United States of America. 91 (10): 4125–9. Bibcode:1994PNAS...91.4125D. doi:10.1073/pnas.91.10.4125. PMC 43737. PMID 7514294.*
- Dontsova, O; Dokudovskaya, S; Kopylov, A; Bogdanov, A; Rinke-Appel, J; Jünke, N; Brimacombe, R (August 1992). "Three widely separated positions in the 16S RNA lie in or close to the ribosomal decoding region; a site-directed cross-linking study with mRNA analogues". The EMBO Journal. 11 (8): 3105–16. doi:10.1002/j.1460-2075.1992.tb05383.x. PMC 556795. PMID 1379176.

=== Books ===
- Sergiev, PV; Golovina, AY; Prokhorova, IV; Sergeeva, OV; Osterman, IA; Nesterchuk, MV; Burakovsky, DE; Bogdanov, AA; Dontsova, OA (2011). "Modifications of ribosomal RNA: From enzymes to function". Ribosomes: Structure, Function, and Dynamics. Springer Verlag. pp. 97–110. doi:10.1007/978-3-7091-0215-2_9. ISBN 978-3-7091-0214-5.

=== Patents ===
- Telomerase inhibiting composition (2017)
- Method for the determination of modified RNA nucleotides (2014)
- Telomerase inhibitors and a method for the preparation thereof (2011)
