= Olga Bulbenkova =

Russian fashion designer

- Born: 1835; Nizhny Novgorod
- Died: 1918 (aged 82–83)
- Known for: Fashion designer

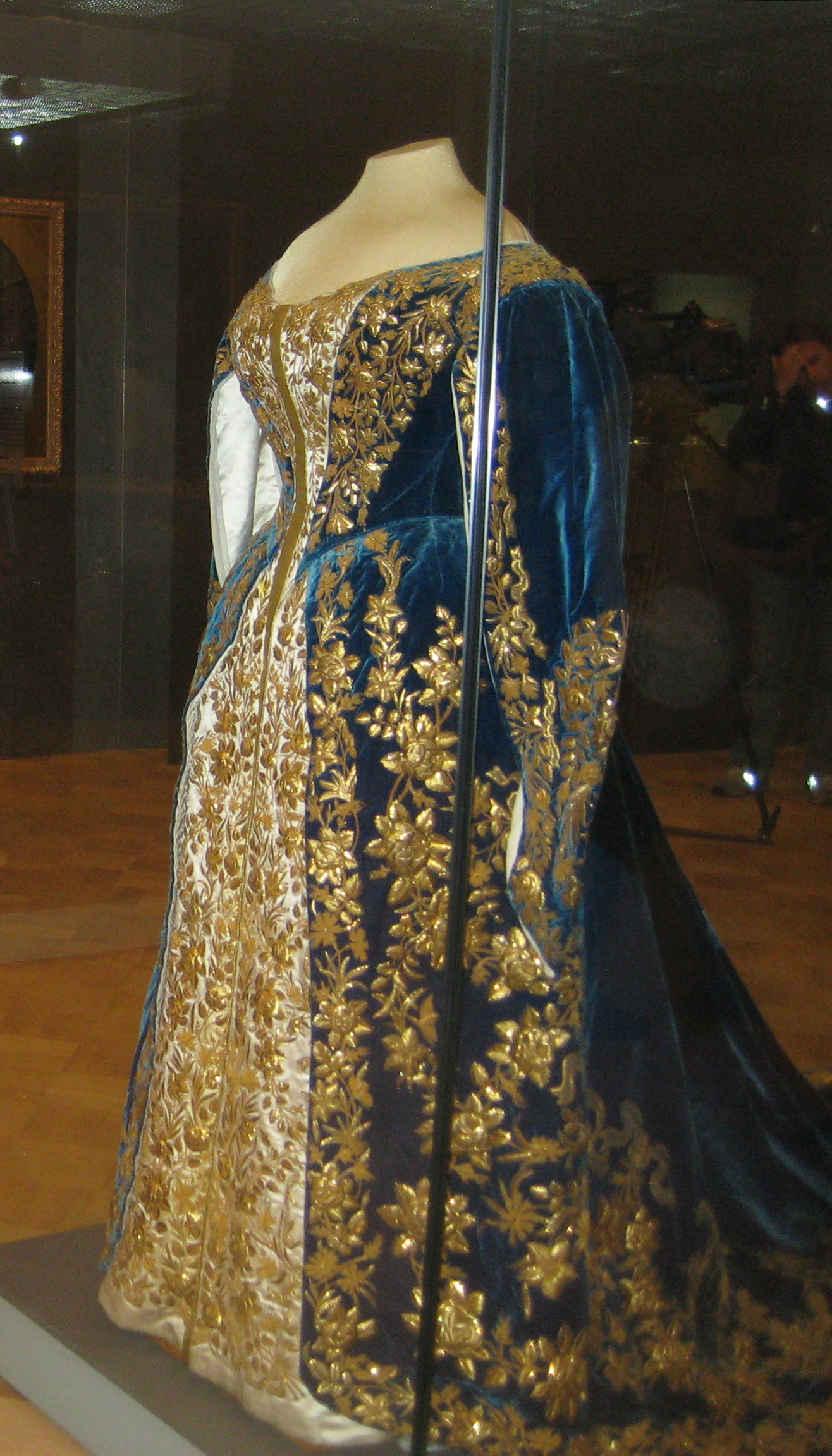
Alexandra Fedorovna's court dress (end 19-20 c, Olga Bulbenkova's workshop, Hermitage) by shakko 06

Olga Bulbenkova (1835-1918) was a Russian fashion designer. She founded the first Russian fashion house.

== Life ==
She was born into a priest’s family in Nizhny Novgorod. At the age of nine, she became a fosterchild of her aunt, the wife of the merchant Butakov of St. Petersburg. Her aunt owned a haberdashery shop on Nevsky Prospect. After secondary school, Olga Bulbenkova studied at the fashionable tailor's workshop of Mme Watt. She eventually took over the workshop herself. She established what has been called the first Russian fashion house. Until the late 19th-century, Russia had not much of a fashion industry, since the upper classes simply followed and imported French fashion. In the second half of the 19th-century however, several Russian fashion houses were created, such as the Brisack/Brizak, the Andiyo fashion house and Anna Hindus.

The Olga Bulbenkova fashion house was first located at 8 Monika Embankment, and later at 68 Ekaterinsky Canal. She swiftly became a very successful fashion designer. She competed with Charles Frederick Worth for clients in the Russian aristocracy, and was a fashion designer of the Imperial court, with Empress Maria Feodorovna and her daughters for her clients. She became the dressmaker of the women of the Imperial family. She specialized in making formal ceremonial costumes for members of the imperial family and the court aristocracy for coronations, weddings, and other festive occasions. She was known for her gold-sewn imperial gowns. She made the formal court dresses of the daughters of Tsar Nicholas II. She made the 1894 wedding dress of Grand Duchess Xenia Alexandrovna of Russia.

In 1910 she retired and left the management to her niece Adriadna Konstantinovna Willim (1890-1976). The fashion house made its last major commission for the imperial court in 1913, for the celebrations of the 300th anniversary of the House of Romanov. The fashion house was closed in after the Russian Revolution in 1917.

Many of the dresses she made for the Imperial family are kept at the Hermitage museum.
