= Olga Craen =

Indian pianist (1913–1986)

Olga Craen LRAM
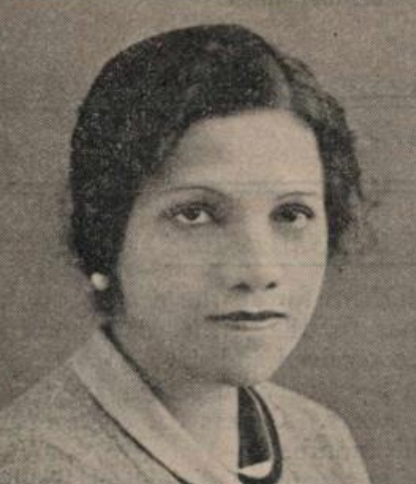
- Craen, from a 1936 issue of The Indian Listener
- Born: Olga Athaide; 1913; Goa, Portuguese India
- Died: 1986 (aged 72–73)
- Education: Royal Academy of Music (RAM)
- Occupations: Pianist; piano educator
- Years active: 1936–1980s
- Spouse: Jules Craen (m. 1939; died 1959)

Olga Athaide Craen LRAM (née Athaide; 1913 – 1986) was an Indian pianist and piano educator. She began her career in 1936 while a student at the Royal Academy of Music (RAM) in London. A finalist in the 1946 Marguerite Long-Jacques Thibaud International Music Competition held in Paris, she later taught piano in Bombay, India.

== Early life ==
Olga Athaide was born in Goa, the daughter of Franklin Herculano Athaide and Ana Maria Luisa da Conceicao Cordeiro. Her mother was also a pianist. With a scholarship from the Sir Ratan Tata Trust, Athaide trained with English pianist Tobias Matthay and completed her studies at the Royal Academy of Music in London in 1936.

== Career ==
During her student days in London, Craen performed on radio and on British and continental concert stages, including Wigmore Hall in 1936. "Miss Athaide's performance showed a warm musical nature," commented one reviewer, "allied with exceptionally brilliant technic and facility." In 1938, she gave a recital at the Cowasji Jehangir Hall, and made her first of many appearances with the Bombay Symphony Orchestra. She returned to Cowasji Jehangir Hall in 1939, with a program of French composers, for the Alliance Française in Bombay.

In 1946, Craen was one of the finalists of the Marguerite Long-Jacques Thibaud International Music Competition in Paris. In 1948, she and her husband faced difficulties when they illegally subleased a flat in India. Both were arrested, and her husband was convicted; he served a jail sentence of several years for the violation. The experience depleted their funds, and their health and reputations.

Craen gave public performances until the late 1950s, and taught piano in Bombay into the 1980s. One of her successful students was Marialena Fernandes.

== Personal life ==
Athaide married Belgian violinist and conductor Jules Craen in 1939. She was widowed when Jules Craen died in 1959; she died from cancer in 1986. In 2013, to mark the centennial of her birth, the Olga & Jules Craen Foundation established the Young Musician of the Year competition.
