= Russian Art Week =

Russian Art Week was a major international art fair in London, UK, which takes places bi-annually every June and November. During the week the UK's four major auction houses Christie's, Sotheby's, MacDougall's and Bonhams present a programme of sales featuring Russian paintings and works of art.> Russian Art Week works in parallel with the salesrooms to provide a comprehensive listing of the season's sales and events. The website and the related published guide provide a single source for information on the Russian auctions as well as other related cultural events, exhibitions and conferences taking place around London. It is accompanied by a directory of Russian auction houses, galleries, dealers and specialist institutions.

== Description ==
The event was founded by Theodora Clarke, editor of Russian Art and Culture, in 2012 and launched at the Embassy of the Russian Federation. Russian Art Week was established in order to aggregate commercial and academic events into one week. Russian art sales in London have seen an increase in recent years, with sales in June 2013 raising £50 million. The guide provides information on the timings and content of the Russian art sales, preview key works and report results.

The Russian Art Week website is run by its parent company Russian Art and Culture which also hosts an opening party to mark the beginning of the week-long event. Previous venues have included Mayfair's Erarta Gallery, where a panel discussion on fakes and forgeries was staged, and the Westbury Hotel. The 2015 Autumn edition was hosted in great style at the Corinthia Hotel Apartments where the Gagliardi Gallery, 40 years on the art scene in the heart of Chelsea, London, was selected to curate the artworks to complement the event. The company also organises a number of complementary VIP events, usually in the form of tours, talks and private exhibition visits.

The Russian Art Week guide was the first publication to provide a comprehensive listing of the week's Russian sales for collectors and dealers. The guide is released two weeks before the event and is available at participating locations across central London or as a free download on the Russian Art Week website. Content is divided into categories consisting of Sales, Events, Directory and Auction Times and contains selected highlights from each auction house. Recent editions have included both Russian and English content.

=== Russian Art and Culture website ===
Russian Art and Culture is the sister website of Russian Art Week and co-hosts its opening party. This website was launched in response to the conference "Cultural Exchange: Russia and the West", held at the University of Bristol in 2011. This site, which takes the form of an online magazine, allows academics, curators, researchers and interested members of the public to both submit articles and to read about the latest developments in Russian art, theory and criticism. The site has an international readership and receives web traffic of 50,000. In February 2014 Russian Art and Culture was shortlisted for the UK Blog Awards 2014, recognising the site as one of the top 10 Arts and Culture blogs in the UK.
