= Olga Rotari =

Classical musician

Olga Rotari Ольга Ротарь
- Born: July 25, 1989; Comrat, Moldova
- Genres: Classical music
- Occupation: Pianist
- Years active: 1995–present
- Website: olgarotari.com

Olga Rotari (Russian: Ольга Ротарь, born on July 25, 1989) is a Moldovan classical pianist and chamber musician.

== Biography ==
Rotari began to play the piano at the age of six-years old. Initially started her piano studies with the musician Natalia Dimcha “наталья димча” and at the age of 15, she enrolled at Anton Rubinstein Music Academy in Tiraspol, Moldova. In pursuit of higher studies, she moved to Turkey. Continued at Istanbul University State Conservatory under the mentoring of Prof. Cana Gurmen. In 2012, she graduated with the degree of baccalaureate of Music in Piano Performance. She attended masterclasses and by year of 2017, she received the Master of Music in Piano Performance after publishing a thesis titled: "Examination of Piano transcriptions and paraphrases written by Franz Liszt on Opera".

In 2020, she joined the ranks of famous musicians as such Simon Rattle, Judith Weir, John McCabe as a member of the Incorporated Society of Musicians the UK's professional body for musicians and subject association for music.

Rotari is not only known as a solo classical pianist, but also as chamber musician. and duet performance in cooperation with other artists such as Tutu Aydınoğlu.

== Competition and awards ==
She rose to prominence after winning the 16th International Young Musicians Chamber Music Competition at Edirne Mimar Sinan Rotary Club Chamber followed by winning three major competitions in 2016: Heirs of Orpheus in Bulgaria, Stars at Tenerife in Spain and Musical Fireworks in Baden-Württemberg – Germany. And in 2018, she won the Musical Fireworks in Baden-Württemberg - Germany 2018.

== Solo and chamber performances ==
- Galatasaray Üniversitesi -Istanbul, Turkey
- Istanbul University State Conservatory – Istanbul, Turkey
- Sweden, General Consulate of Japan - Istanbul, Turkey
- Notre Dame de Sion -Istanbul, Turkey
- Medica Culture Center -Istanbul, Turkey
- Zorlu PSM – Istanbul, Turkey
- Yeldeğirmeni Culture and Art Center - Istanbul, Turkey
- Caddebostan Culture and Art Center Main Hall - Istanbul, Turkey
- Süreyya Opera Hall - Istanbul, Turkey
- Galatasaray University – Istanbul, Turkey
- Istanbul University Congress and Culture Center - Istanbul, Turkey

== Festival and events ==
- Pera International Piano Festival -Beyoğlu, Turkey
- Antalya International Piano Festival -Antalya, Turkey
- Edirne Mimar Sinan Rotary Young Musicians Chamber Performance - Edirne, Turkey
- Bayerische Musikakademie - Marktoberdorf, Germany
- Istanbul International Chamber Choir May 11, 2011 in Istanbul, Turkey
- Intertemporal German Music Event at Caddebostan Cultural Center
- Piano Recital - Caddebostan Cultural Center Concert
- laureate of international competitions TV interview at ATV Channel
