= Olga Cook =

American actress

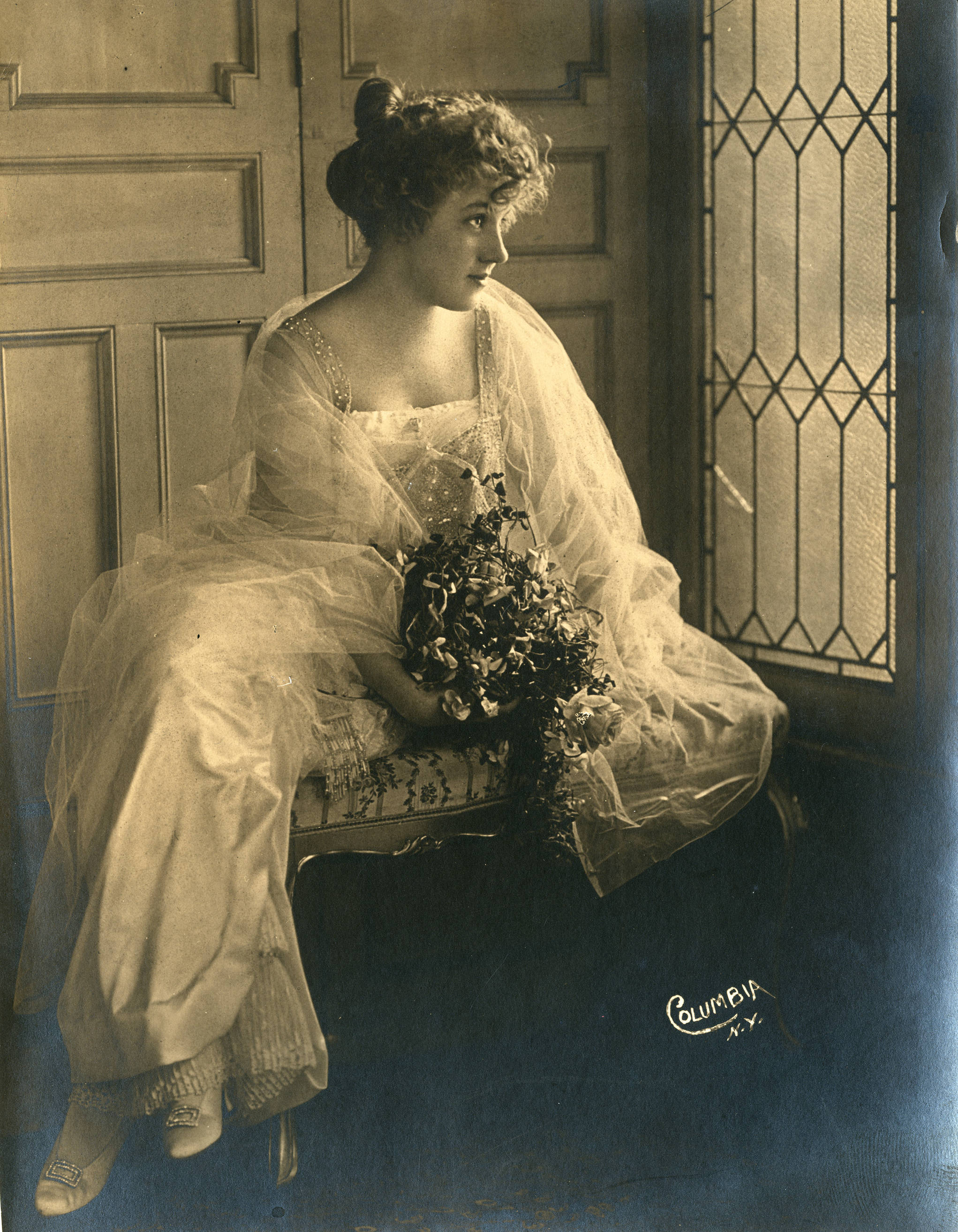
- Olga Cook, from a 1918 publicity photo
- Born: New York, New York, U.S.
- Died: December 15, 1991
- Other names: Olga Cook Line
- Occupations: Actress, singer, vaudeville performer

Olga Cook Line (born about 1895, died December 15, 1991) was an American actress, singer, and vaudeville performer in the 1920s.

== Early life and education ==
Cook was from New York City, the daughter of policeman and athlete Edward Cook and Margaret A. Martin Cook. She graduated from Washington Irving High School, and studied singing in New York with Francis Stuart.

== Career ==
Cook began her stage career as a vaudeville performer. She appeared in Broadway musicals, in The Passing Show of 1919, The Midnight Rounders of 1921, Blossom Time (1921–1923), and The Passing Show of 1924. She also sang on radio broadcasts, and played herself in one short silent film, Starland Review No. 4 (1922). She was considered a stage beauty, and her diet and style choices were reported in detail.

Cook returned to vaudeville in 1923, and starred in Gus Edwards' Sunbonnet Sue revue. "Olga Cook is the queen bee of vaudeville singers," noted Washington Daily News in 1923. "No perching and twittering; no fussing and fooling. She strides to the stage, opens her mouth, and beautiful sounds come out. She is a thoro, banging hit, and deservedly." She appeared in The Student Prince in Chicago in 1925, and announced that she was taking "a well-earned rest" from the stage in 1926.

Cook's rest was short-lived. In 1927, she and pianist Eric Zardo toured together, and performed at a midnight benefit in New York City for Mississippi flood victims. In 1928, she starred as Barbara Fritchie in an operetta called My Maryland, when it was produced in Philadelphia, New York, and Hartford. In 1934, she sang at a Daughters of the American Revolution memorial service at a battlefield on Mackinac Island.

== .Personal life ==
In December 1925, Cook married G. Keith Line, a "millionaire sportsman" who owned horse stables and riding academies in Illinois, Michigan and Florida. The Lines lived in Chicago in 1930 and 1940. She died in 1991.
