= Olga Liashenko =

Ukrainian German painter

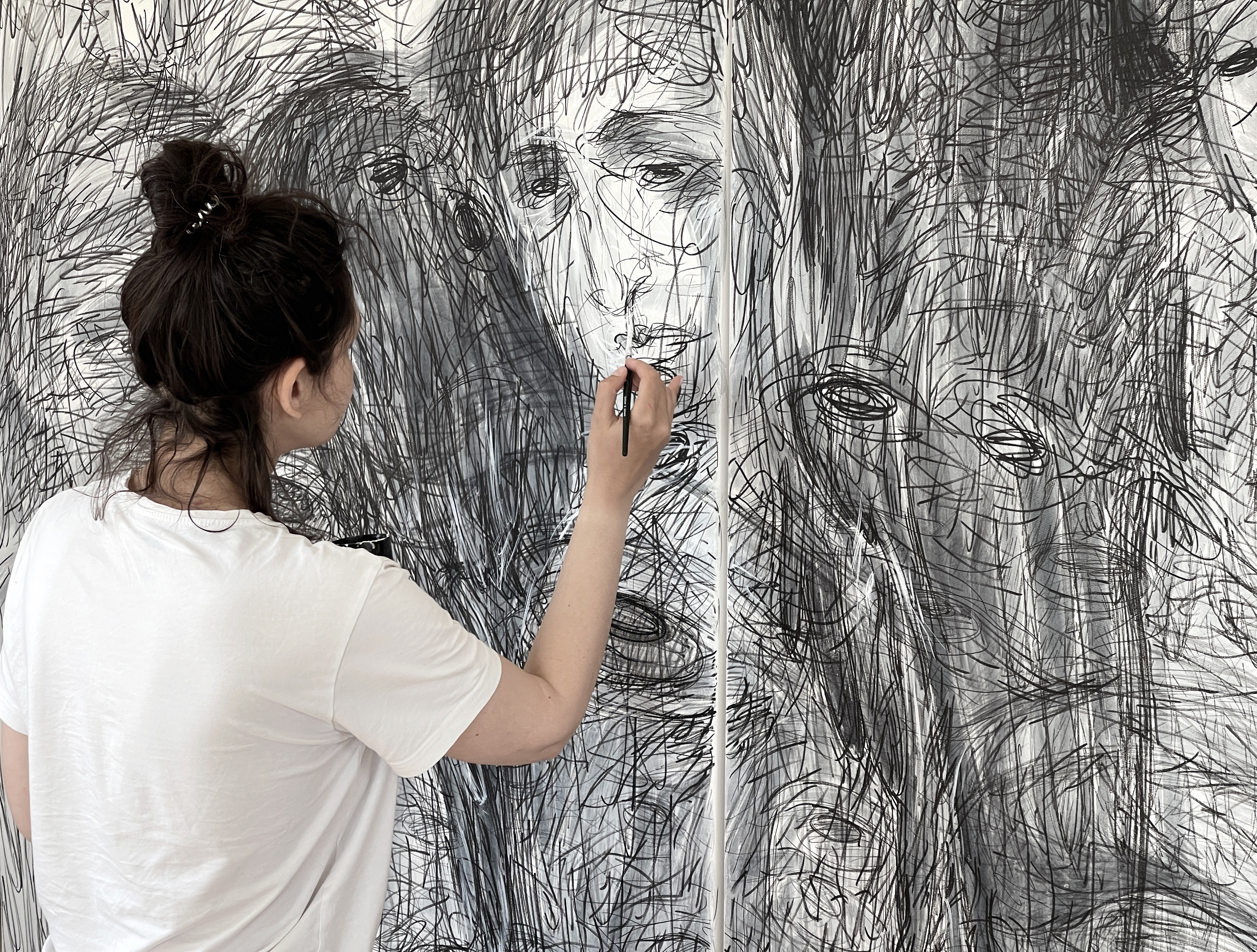
- Olga Liashenko
- Education: Kharkiv State Academy of Design and Arts
- Known for: Painting
- Movement: abstract art
- Website: www.olga-liashenko.org

Olga Liashenko (Ukrainian: О́льга Ляшенко Olga Lyashenko; born 27 July 1979 in Kharkiv, Ukrainian SSR, Soviet Union) is a Ukrainian German artist and Icon painter, currently living in Germany.

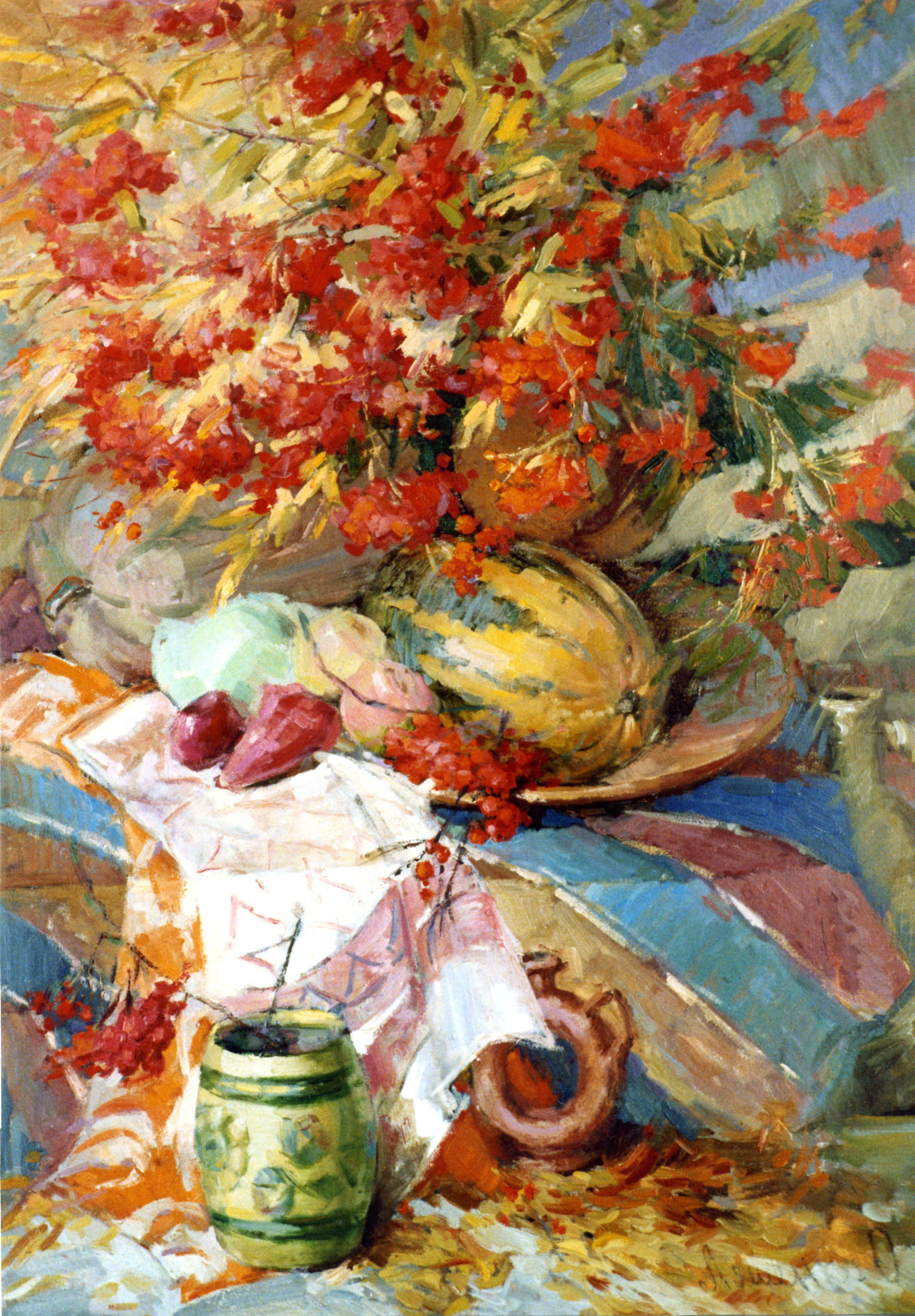
Украинская осень (Ukrainian Autumn) 2004 oil painting (student work)

== Life ==
Olga Liashenko studied from 1996 to 1999 at the Kharkiv State School of Art, Ukraine and was educated as a painter there. She started studying at Kharkiv State Academy of Design and Arts in 1999 studying iconography, Art painting and drawing. Additionally to art genres such as painting and drawing, she learned handicrafts - icon painting. In 2006 Olga Liashenko graduated from the academy with honors as an academic painter and an icon painter.

At the beginning of October 2010, she moved to Germany to continue getting her second education at Erfurt University of Applied Sciences (Fachhochschule Erfurt) at the Faculty of Conservation and Restoration specializing in restoration of the mural paintings and architectural surfaces. From 2012 to 2014 Olga Liashenko was participating in the Deutschlandstipendium program. She was awarded the academic degree Master of Arts when graduated from the university.

Olga Liashenko paints in Bavaria / Franconia.

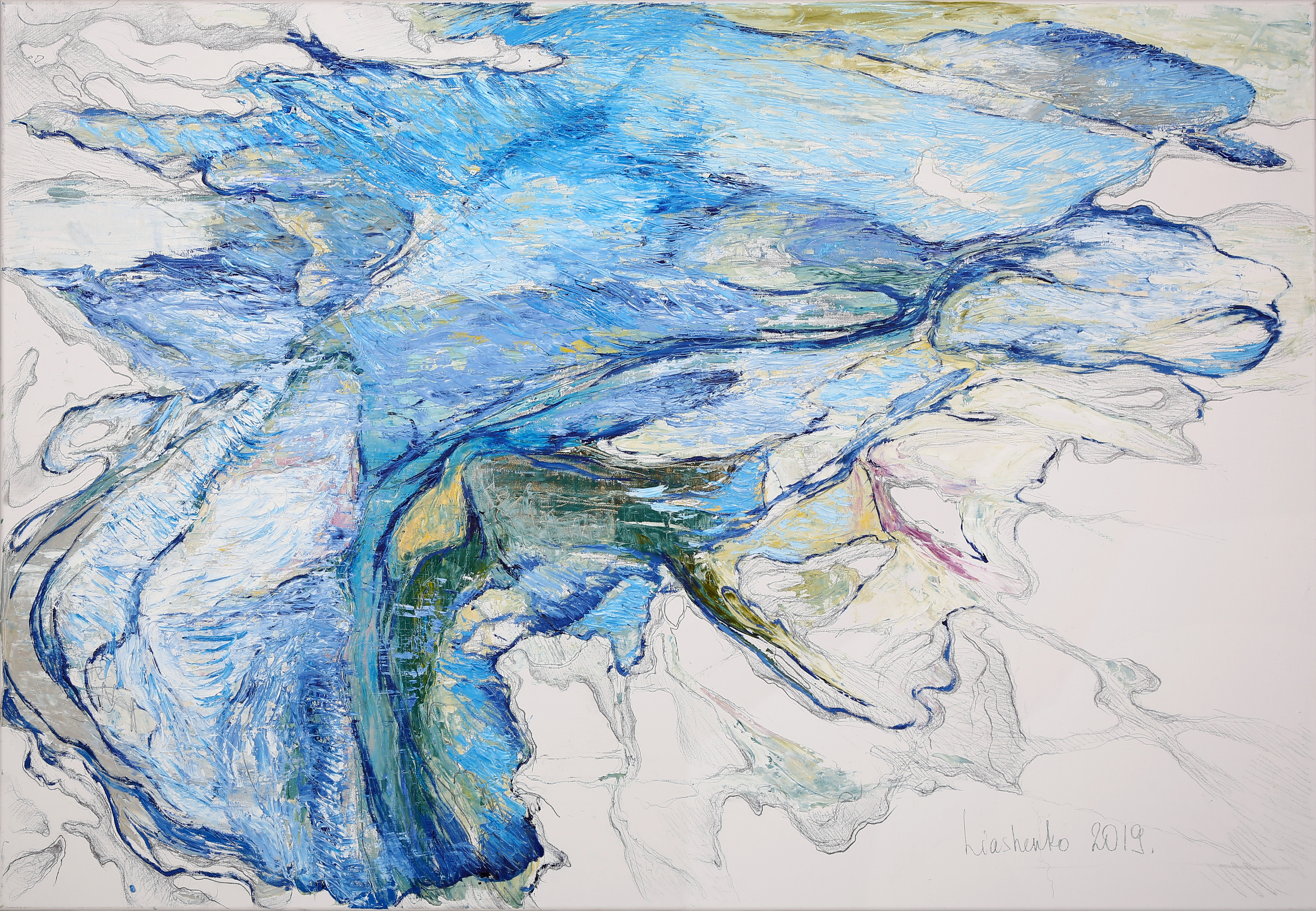
Main.Leben 2019 (Main river.Life) 2019 mixed media

== Painting ==
During the study period Olga Liashenko was finding an artistic inspiration from the works of Leonardo da Vinci, Gerhard Richter and Marco Geiko. During this period of time, she devoted herself to summer plein air painting in the Crimea. For her diploma thesis, Olga Liashenko created a monumental painting called "Пасха (Easter)", which is dedicated to the Christian themes. From 1998 to 2010, she took an active part in various exhibitions in Ukraine and Russia.

The technique of her painting has changed over time from oil painting in the academic style to mixed media art. In April, 2010 Olga Liashenko received a special jury prize from Boris Mikhailov (photographer) at the international festival "Non-Stop Media V", which took place in the Kharkiv Municipal Gallery as a biennial.

The style of her work evolved from realistic to figurative abstract art. As a result of this evolution, styles of art were intertwined, creating a special and unique style. The artist Olga Liashenko increased her commitment to artistic endeavors in Germany. Since 2017 she has been a member of the Federal Association of Academic Artists (BBK Bundesverband Bildender Künstlerinnen und Künstler). In 2020, she presented her works in the exhibition for the Hassberge district's art prize in Bavaria.

Parallel to the change in painting technique was a thematic reorientation. In addition to classic still life and landscape representations, other themes emerged. Working on a variety of series of pieces, she defines her own artwork style at the same time Olga Liashenko focuses on relevant and current topics.

== Icon painting ==
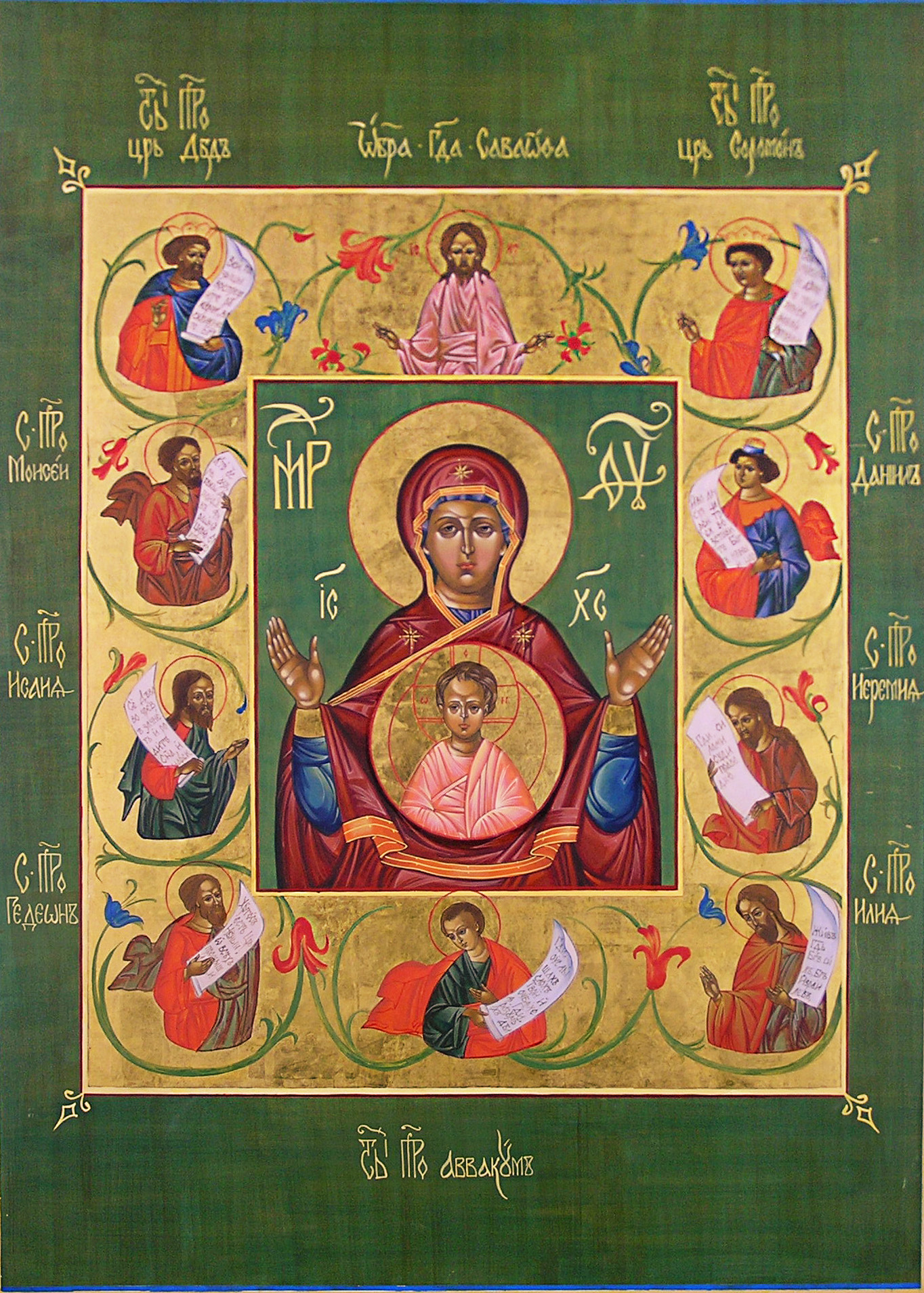
Знамение. Курская Коренная (Our Lady of the Sign (Kursk Korennaia)) 2005 tempera, gilding, Nativity Church, Ulanok in Kursk region, Russia

At the age of 13, Olga Liashenko painted her first icon of Holy Mary. In later training, she learned a variety of icon painting techniques, including tempera. For her Master's thesis, Olga Liashenko painted the icon “Знамение. Курская Коренная (Our Lady of the Sign (Kursk Korennaia))” for the Nativity Church in Ulanok near Kursk, Russia. Within the central part of the icon, the Mother of God is surrounded by saints and floral ornaments. During the writing of the icon, she used image canons based on Byzantine iconography. Olga Liashenko uses natural pigments to paint in egg tempera on wood. The haloes traditionally have gold leaf gilding.

She created the iconostasis for the Elezkij Dormition Monastery in Chernihiv, Ukraine, during 2012–2013. In its design, the icon of "Jesus Christ on the throne" traditionally played a significant role. Besides the Majestas Domini, there are full-length Deesis icons bearing numerous saints and archangels on medallions.

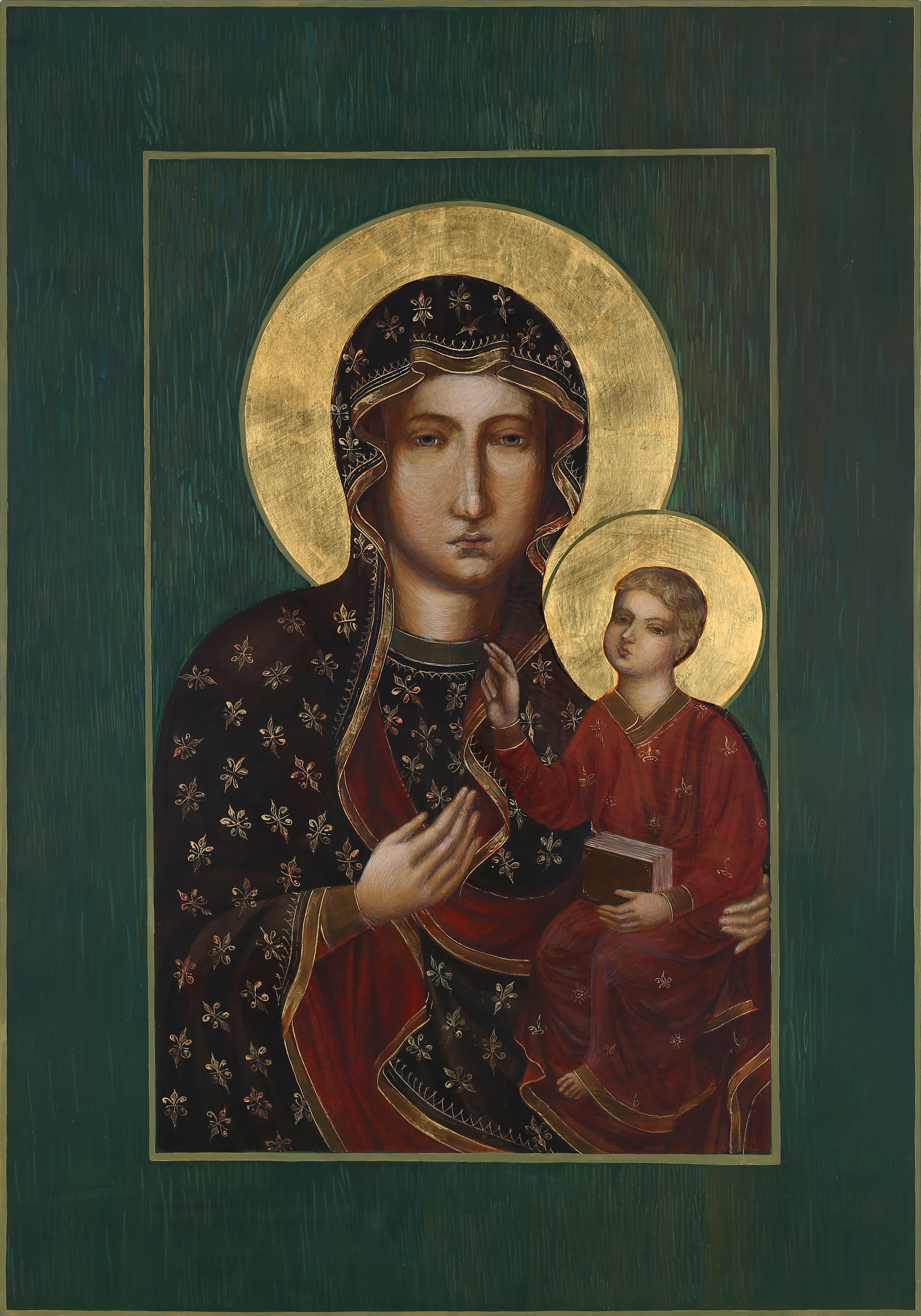
Schwarze Madonna von Tschenstochau (Black Madonna Czestochowa) 2021 empera, gilding

== Exhibitions (selection) ==
- 2010: Non Stop Media V, Jury award, Харківська муніципальна галерея (Kharkiv Municipal Gallery), Kharkiv Ukraine (catalog)
- 2014: Beskidzkie Integracje Sztuki VIII (Integration of Art VIII 2014), Galleria Kukuczka (Gallery Kukuczka), Istebna Poland (catalog)
- 2016-2017: Galerie Kunsthandwerkerhof, Königsberg Bayern Germany
- 2017: Zeigt her eure..., BBK - Gallery in Kulturspeicher, Würzburg Germany
- 2018: Farben - Glanz, Kunsthaus, Haßfurt Germany
- 2018: Krokodil in der Suppe, BBK - Gallery in Kulturspeicher, Würzburg Germany
- 2019: Neuaufnahmen/DIE NEUEN, BBK - Gallery in Kulturspeicher, Würzburg Germany
- 2019–2020: Ikonen - Geschriebene Bilder (Icons - Written Pictures), Museum City Miltenberg, Miltenberg Germany
- 2020: PositivWir, Coburg Hospital, Coburg Germany
- 2020: H2O - Lebenselixier im Landkreis Haßberge, „Kunststuck (Artwork)“ Hassberge art award, Oberschwappach Museum Castle, Knetzgau Germany (booklet)
- 2021: FRAUENTAG 2021 (WOMEN 'S DAY 2021), BBK online Gallery Würzburg Germany (Postcards, Art calendar: UNENDLICH FRAU (Everlasting Woman))
- 2021: WELLE (WAVE), BBK - Gallery in Kulturspeicher, Würzburg Germany
- 2021: was bleibt (what remains), Heidelberg Forum für Kunst, Heidelberg Germany (catalog)
- 2021: Sommerausstellung (summer exhibition) BBK - Lower Franconia, Neue Galerie in Bronnbach Monastery, Wertheim Germany
- 2021: NATUR - MENSCH 2021 (NATURE - HUMAN 2021), Sankt Andreas art award, Sankt Andreasberg, Harz National Park Germany (catalog)
