= Olga García Mancheño =

Organic chemistry professor

Olga García Mancheño is an organic chemistry professor at the University of Münster in Germany. García Mancheño directs an organic chemistry research group at University of Münster that focuses on development of new catalytic methods with the goal of developing sustainable synthetic routes to accomplish carbon-hydrogen functionalization, organic chemical rearrangements, and photocatalyzed chemical reactions.

== Academic career ==
García Mancheño earned her bachelor's degree in 2001 from the Faculty of Sciences of the Autonomous University of Madrid in Madrid, Spain. She continued at the Autonomous University of Madrid to earn her Ph.D. in 2005 under the mentorship of Juan Carlos Carretero. She continued her training in organic chemistry as a postdoctoral researcher in the lab of Carsten Bolm at RWTH Aachen University in Aachen, Germany. She completed her habilitation at University of Münster mentored by Frank Glorius, and then worked in a temporary professorship at the University of Göttingen in the city of Göttingen, Germany before acquiring her first permanent faculty position. She was an assistant professor of organic chemistry at the University of Regensburg in Bavaria, Germany from 2013-2017. In 2017, García Mancheño became a professor of organic chemistry at the University of Münster, in Münster, North Rhine-Westphalia, Germany, where she also completed her habilitation.

== Research ==
García Mancheño is head of a research group at the University of Münster that focuses on developing new catalysts to accomplish organic chemical transformations. She has authored several review articles in peer-reviewed journals on topics in organocatalytic chemistry, and is the editor of a textbook on anion-binding catalysts.

== Mentoring ==
García Mancheño was successful is acquiring funding from the European Research Council in 2017 to start her research program at the University of Münster. She has been a speaker at several training events to help other early career scientists in Germany to acquire funding for their research programs. In 2018 she was a speaker at the Interactive Information Event: ERC Consolidator Grant at the University of Münster to share advice about applying for that specific grant opportunity. She was invited by the German Fulbright Association and Research Corporation for Science Advancement to speak at workshops that are aimed to prepare university professors in Germany to be successful. She spoke at the Fulbright-Cottrell Junior Faculty Professional Development Workshops in 2018 (Berlin) and in 2019 (Göttingen).

== Honors and awards ==
García Mancheño has received the following honors and awards during her career:

- 2019 invited speaker at Fulbright-Cottrell Junior Faculty Professional Development Workshop in Göttingen
- 2018 invited speaker at Fulbright-Cottrell Junior Faculty Professional Development Workshop in Berlin
- 2017 European Research Council Consolidator Grant (CoG). Frontiers in Catalytic Anion-Binding Chemistry (Max funding of €1,997,763)
- 2016 ORCHEM Prize from the Liebig-Vereinigung für Organische Chemie of the Gesellschaft Deutscher Chemiker
