= Olga Dudko =

Ukrainian physicist and academic

- Ольга Дудко
- Born: Ukraine
- Education: University of Kharkiv
- Scientific career
- Workplaces: University of California, San Diego; National Institutes of Health; Tel Aviv University

Olga Dudko (Note: Ukrainian: Ольга Дудко, romanized: Olha Dudko) is a physicist who is a professor at the University of California, San Diego. Her research makes use of theoretical physics to understand complex biological problems. She was elected Fellow of the American Physical Society in 2022.

== Early life and education ==
Dudko completed undergraduate and postgraduate research at the National University of Kharkiv, where she worked in condensed matter physics. She moved to Tel Aviv University as a postdoctoral fellow, where she worked alongside Joseph Klafter on dynamic force spectroscopy. Dudko eventually left Israel for the National Institutes of Health.

== Research and career ==
Dudko joined the University of California, San Diego in 2007. She uses physics-based approaches to understand biological systems. In partnership with Attila Szabo and Gerhard Hummer, Dudko devised the Dudko-Hummer-Szabo theory to describe the kinetic behaviour of macromolecules in dynamic force experiments. She was awarded an National Science Foundation CAREER Award and a Hellman Fellowship to investigate single molecule biophysics. By translating the physics developed to understand the phase transitions of polymers to biological systems, Dudko explained the organizational processes that take place within the nuclei of living cells. She developed a theoretical description of synaptic transmission, that showed that chemical synapses had similar behavior irrespective of their size or rate of neurotransmitter release.

Dudko became associate editor of Physical Review Letters in 2019. In 2022, she was named a Simons Foundation Investigator, and elected a Fellow of the American Physical Society.

== Selected publications ==
- Olga K Dudko; Gerhard Hummer; Attila Szabo (15 March 2006). "Intrinsic rates and activation free energies from single-molecule pulling experiments". Physical Review Letters. 96 (10) 108101. doi:10.1103/physrevlett.96.108101. ISSN 0031-9007. PMID 16605793. Wikidata Q51944047.
- Olga K Dudko; Gerhard Hummer; Attila Szabo (13 October 2008). "Theory, analysis, and interpretation of single-molecule force spectroscopy experiments". Proceedings of the National Academy of Sciences of the United States of America. 105 (41): 15755–15760. Bibcode:2008PNAS..10515755D. doi:10.1073/pnas.0806085105. ISSN 0027-8424. PMC 2572921. PMID 18852468. Wikidata Q33375593.
- Vaijayanti Gupta; Michael Parisi; David Sturgill; et al. (16 February 2006). "Global analysis of X-chromosome dosage compensation". Journal of Biology. 5 (1): 3. doi:10.1186/jbiol30. ISSN 1478-5854. PMC 1414069. PMID 16507155. Wikidata Q34480938.
