= Olga Ossani =

Italian writer and feminist (1875-1962)

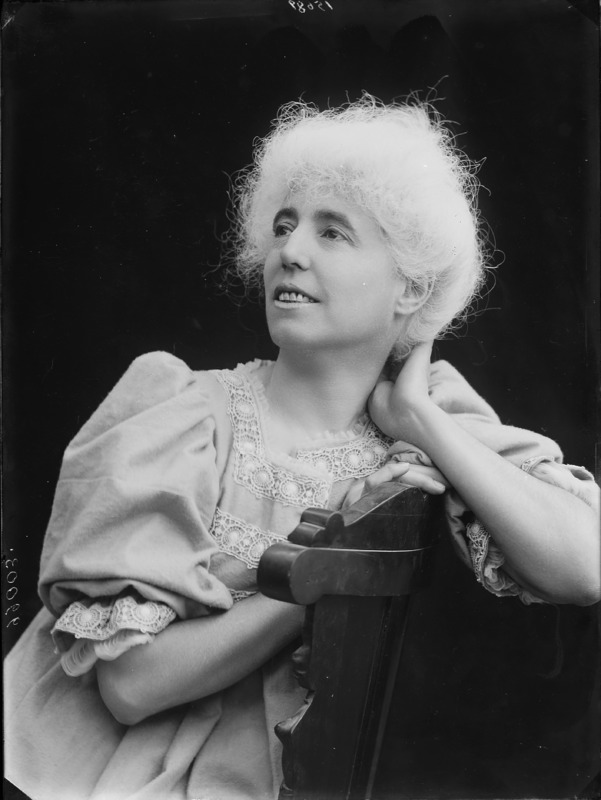
- Born: Olga Ossani; 24 May 1857; Rome, Italy
- Died: 11 February 1933 (aged 75); Rome, Italy
- Occupations: Activist, writer, journalist
- Writing career
- Pen name: Febea, Carbonilla

Olga Ossani (May 24, 1857 - February 11, 1933) was an Italian journalist, writer, and women's rights activist. She is considered one of the pioneering female journalists in Italy.

== Career ==
Ossani made her mark as one of Italy's first female journalists, breaking ground in a male-dominated field. She was involved in editing La vita, a Roman newspaper with a pro-suffrage stance, alongside her husband Luigi Lodi.

In addition to her journalistic work, Ossani was also known as a writer. She contributed to the growing body of literature produced by Italian women writers in the post-unification period.

== Activism and feminism ==
Ossani was part of a network of women who challenged traditional constructions of femininity in early 20th-century Italy. Along with figures like Sibilla Aleramo, Maria Montessori, and Eleonora Duse, she advocated for women's right to pursue professional ambitions and artistic endeavors.

During a cholera outbreak in Naples in 1884, she volunteered to the Croce Bianca (White Cross) to help out the victims.
