= Olga Lagrange-Gerlach =

German opera singer

Olga Lagrange-Gerlach, née Olga Gerlach, (1 November 1874 in Metz – 20 January 1949 in Munich at age 74) was a German mezzo-soprano.

== Sources ==
- Karl-Josef Kutsch, Leo Riemens: Großes Sängerlexikon. Vol. 33, Directmedia Publ., Berlin, 2000.
