= Olga Lychkina =

Russian freestyle skier

Personal information
- Nationality: Russian
- Born: 17 June 1968 (age 56)

Sport
- Sport: Freestyle skiing

Olga Lychkina (born 17 July 1968) is a Russian freestyle skier. She competed in the women's moguls event at the 1992 Winter Olympics.
