= Olga Grishenkova =

Russian ballet dancer

- Ольга Владимировна Гришенкова
- Born: 18 January 1989 (age 37); Novosibirsk, Soviet Union
- Education: Novosibirsk State Choreographic College
- Occupation: ballet dancer
- Years active: 2007–present
- Title: Merited Artist of the Russian Federation (2020)

Olga Vladimirovna Grishenkova (Russian: Ольга Владимировна Гришенкова; born 18 January 1989 in Novosibirsk, Soviet Union) is a Russian ballet dancer, prima ballerina of the Novosibirsk Opera and Ballet Theatre, Merited Artist of Russia (2020).

== Biography ==
In 2007, Olga Grishenkova graduated from the Novosibirsk State Choreographic School. In the same year, she was invited to the troupe of the Novosibirsk Opera and Ballet Theatre.

At the Novosibirsk Opera and Ballet Theatre, the ballerina performs the roles of Odette/Odile (Swan Lake, chor. M. Petipa, L. Ivanov), Giselle (Giselle, or Vilisa, chor. J. Perrot, J. Coralli, M. Petipa in N. Dolgushin's version), Phrygia (Spartacus, Y. Grigorovich; Spartacus, G. Kovtun), Lady of the Dryads and Street Dancer (Don Quixote, chor. M. Petipa, A. Gorsky), Gamzatti (La Bayadère, chor. M. Petipa), Zobeida (Scheherazade, chor. M. Fokin), Gulnara (Le Corsaire, chor. M. Petipa, ed. F. Ruzimatov), Masha (The Nutcracker, chor. V. Vainonen), Magnolia and Countess Cherry (Cipollino, chor. G. Mayorov), Diana Mireille (Flames of Paris, chor. V. Vainonen, ed. M. Messerer), Princess Aurora (The Sleeping Beauty, chor. Nacho Duato) and solo parts in the ballets Chopiniana (chor. M. Fokin), Pulcinella (chor. K. Simonov), Grand pas from the Paquita ballet (chor. M. Petipa).

== Awards and honours ==
In 2020, the ballerina was awarded the title of Merited Artist of the Russian Federation.
