= Voĺha Karač =

Belarusian journalist (born 1979)

- Ольга Евгеньевна Карач; Вольга Яўгенаўна Карач
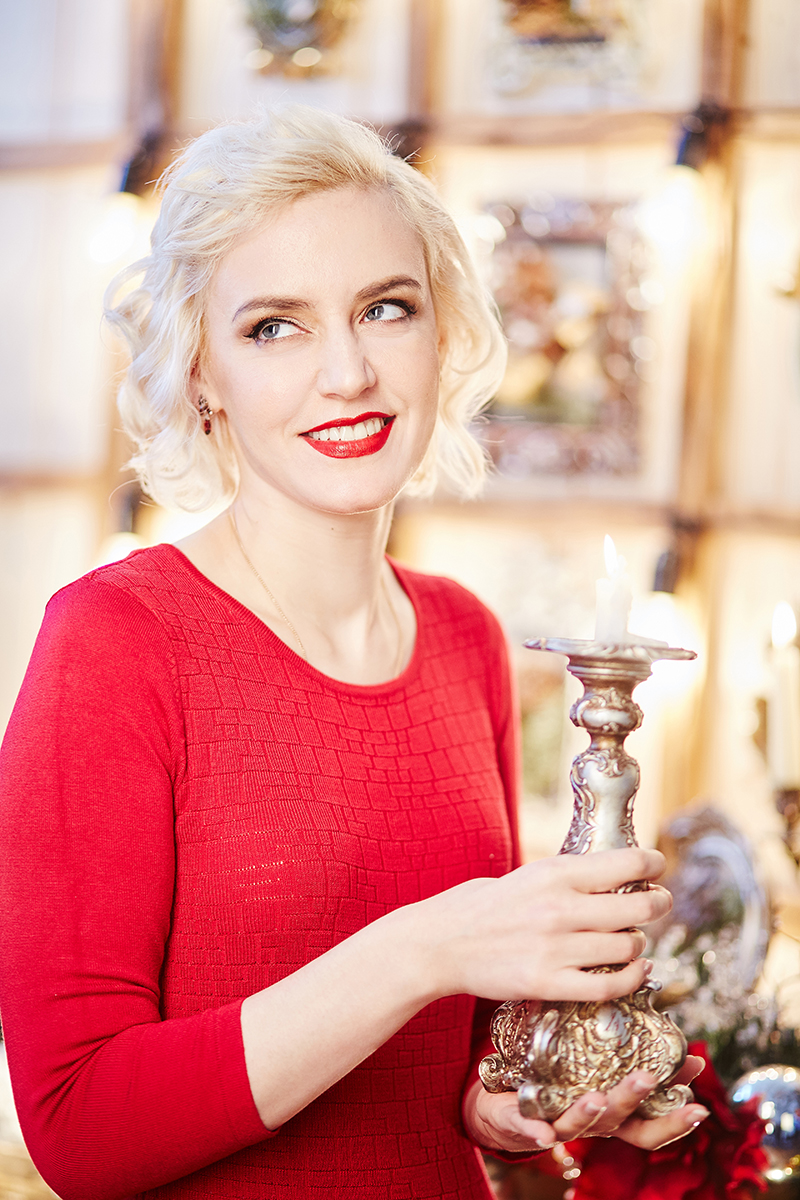
- Born: 5 January 1979 (age 47); Vitebsk, Byelorussian SSR
- Education: Vitebsk State University, European Humanities University
- Occupations: Politician, writer, social activist

Voĺha Jaŭhenaŭna Karač (Belarusian: Вольга Яўгенаўна Карач; Russian: Ольга Евгеньевна Карач; born 5 January 1979), also known internationally as Olga Karach or Olga Karatch, is a Belarusian human rights defender, peace activist, journalist and civil society activist. She is the founder and director of Our House (Nash Dom), a Belarusian human rights organisation operating from Lithuania.

Karač has been involved in Belarusian civil society and opposition politics since the late 1990s. Her activities have included human rights advocacy, civic education, support for people affected by political repression, women's rights, nonviolent civic action and advocacy for the right to conscientious objection to military service.

In July 2024, a Belarusian court sentenced Karač in absentia to 12 years' imprisonment as part of criminal proceedings against several Belarusian activists and opposition figures.

== Early life and education ==
Karač was born on 5 January 1979 in Vitebsk, in the then Byelorussian Soviet Socialist Republic.

She studied Russian and Belarusian philology at what is now Vitebsk State University, graduating with honours in 2002. She later studied political science at the European Humanities University in Vilnius and received a master's degree in 2012.

In the early 2000s, Karač worked as a teacher in Vitebsk. She taught Russian language and literature and later English.

== Civic and political activity ==
Karač became involved in civic activism while studying at university. In 1996, she founded the youth initiative The Seventh Side in Vitebsk.

In 2001–2002, she served as the coordinator of the unregistered youth movement ZUBR in Vitebsk and the Vitebsk Region.

On 21 November 2002, Karač left her position as ZUBR coordinator. In December 2002, she launched the civic initiative Our House in Vitebsk. At the time, she was also a member of the Belarusian Association of Young Politicians.

While working as a teacher, Karač became increasingly involved in political activity. According to biographical accounts, her employment was terminated after she was nominated as a parliamentary candidate.

In March 2003, Karač was elected to the Vitebsk City Council of Deputies. She became the only representative of the democratic opposition on the council and its youngest member.

From 2008 to 2012, she headed the Vitebsk regional branch of the United Civic Party of Belarus.

In 2009, Karač was involved in a project that resulted in the publication of the memoir collection Children of War, based on recollections of former prisoners of Nazi concentration camps and people who had been forcibly taken to Germany as children.

She also initiated and organised civic campaigns and public initiatives including Beware of the Police!, Our House — Hold Deputies to Account!, and Flowers Instead of Weeds, a campaign focused on the maintenance of cemeteries.

Karač was also the initiator of Chinovniki.info, an online project monitoring the activities of Belarusian state officials and institutions and providing tools for public oversight and civic participation.

== Our House ==
Karač founded and has led Our House (Belarusian and Russian: Nash Dom), which developed from a local civic initiative into a human rights organisation.

Our House has worked on human rights monitoring, assistance to people affected by political repression, civic education, gender equality and advocacy before European and international institutions.

Karač has represented Our House internationally and has spoken on issues including repression in Belarus, civil society, women's participation in peacebuilding and conscientious objection.

Following Russia's full-scale invasion of Ukraine in 2022, Karač and Our House placed particular emphasis on the rights of Belarusian conscientious objectors, draft evaders and deserters and on preventing the participation of Belarusian citizens in the war.

== Journalism and writing ==
Karač has worked as a journalist, political commentator and civic educator. She has written on Belarusian politics, civil society, nonviolent resistance, gender issues, human rights and conflict resolution.

She has been associated with independent Belarusian media and is a member of the Belarusian Association of Journalists.

Her publications include analytical articles on Belarusian politics and civil society and the civic activism manual Good Morning, Belarus!.

== International human rights and peace activities ==
Karač has participated in international human rights, peacebuilding and women's networks and advocacy initiatives.

Her work has included cooperation with organisations addressing conscientious objection, antimilitarism, women's participation in peace processes and the protection of civil society activists.

She has also participated in international advocacy activities involving European institutions and human rights organisations.

== Persecution in Belarus ==
Karač has been subjected to criminal prosecution and other restrictive measures by the Belarusian authorities.

In 2021, the KGB included her in its list of persons allegedly involved in terrorist activities.

In 2021, the YouTube and Telegram channels associated with Our House were designated as "extremist materials" by the Belarusian authorities. In 2022, Karač's own YouTube and Telegram channels were also designated as extremist materials. In May 2022, the Belarusian Ministry of Internal Affairs designated Our House itself an "extremist formation".

In July 2024, the Brest Regional Court sentenced Karač in absentia to 12 years' imprisonment in a general-security penal colony and imposed a fine. The charges included conspiracy to seize state power by unconstitutional means, participation in an "extremist formation", discrediting Belarus and other offences.

== Status in Lithuania ==
Karač has lived in Lithuania for a number of years and heads the Vilnius-based Our House organisation.

In August 2023, the Lithuanian Migration Department rejected her application for political asylum after the State Security Department of Lithuania assessed that she represented a threat to national security.

The Lithuanian security service stated that its assessment concerned Karač's contacts and activities involving Russia. Karač rejected allegations that she had cooperated with Russian or Belarusian intelligence services.

Following the asylum decision, several international peace and human rights organisations launched a campaign calling for her protection and asylum.

== Political positions and criticism ==
Karač has been a long-standing opponent of the government of Alexander Lukashenko and has advocated political change through nonviolent means.

She has also sharply criticised some leaders and organisations within the Belarusian opposition, including Sviatlana Tsikhanouskaya.

In interviews, Karač has argued that the Belarusian democratic movement became divided after the 2020 Belarusian presidential election and has criticised the political strategy and role of Tsikhanouskaya's office.

== Public allegations and disputes ==
Karač has been the subject of allegations by other Belarusian opposition figures.

Ihar Makar accused Karač of involvement in circumstances surrounding the detention by Russian and Belarusian security services of Youras Ziankovich and Alyaksandr Feduta, who were later prosecuted in Belarus in connection with an alleged coup plot.

After his release, Ziankovich denied Karač's involvement. He said that he had travelled to Moscow for meetings of his own initiative and stated that Karač "had nothing to do with it".

Feduta also denied Karač's involvement in his arrest.

== Awards and recognition ==
Karač has received a number of international awards for human rights and peace activities.

In 2022, she and Russian historian and human rights activist Irina Shcherbakova received the Human Rights Award of the City of Weimar.

In 2023, Karač received the Alexander Langer International Prize and the Seán MacBride Peace Prize.

In 2025, she received the Brescia Peace Prize in Italy.

Her earlier recognitions include an international peace award in Bremen in 2019 and an international award for civil courage in Radebeul in 2010.

== Selected works ==
- Karač, Voĺha. Good Morning, Belarus! (2010). - Karač, O. "European Strategy for Belarus after the Parliamentary Elections of 2008." News of IISEPS, No. 3 (2008), pp. 56–58. - Karač, O. "Civil Society and Youth: Demotivators." In Youth and Civil Society in Belarus: New Generation, 2011. - Karač, O. "Why Am I in Belarusian Politics While My Classmates Keep Away From It." In Rising Tide for Cooperation? Nordic-Baltic Relations in the 21st Century, 2012.

== See also ==
- Human rights in Belarus
- Belarusian opposition
- 2020–2021 Belarusian protests
- Conscientious objection
- Human rights in Lithuania
