= Olga Aikala =

Finnish horologist

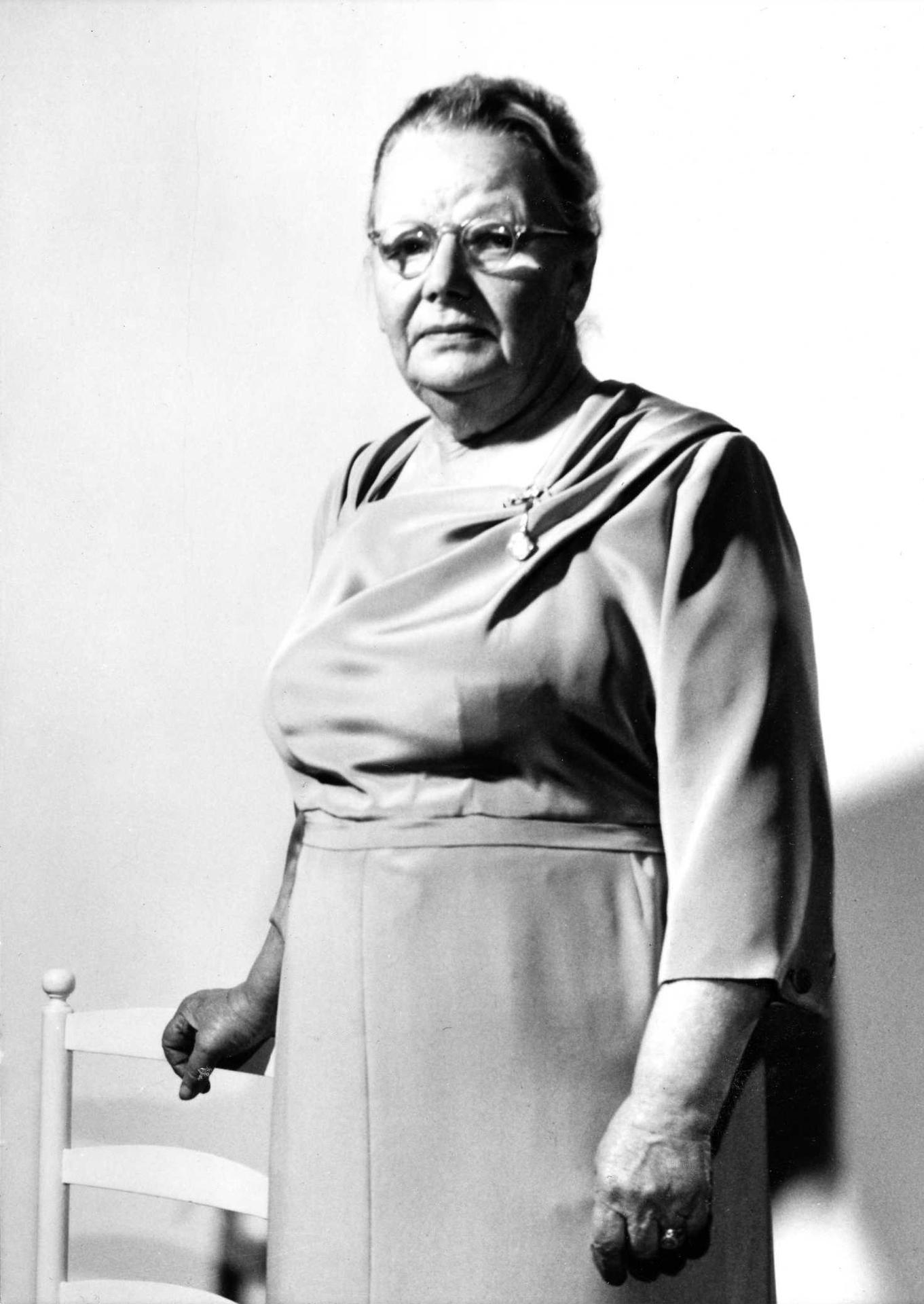
Olga Maria Aikala

Olga Maria Aikala (née Westerlund; 21 June 1883 – 15 December 1962) was a Finnish horologist who was the CEO of Aikalan Kello ja Kulta Oy.
