= Olga Paterova =

Transnistrian politician

Olga Paterova (Cyrillic: Ольга Патерова) is a politician in Transnistria. She was born in Tiraspol, the capital of Transnistria, in 1984, then part of the Moldovan SSR. As of 2005, she was the press secretary for the political youth organization Breakthrough (Russian: Proriv).

Along with fellow Breakthrough-leader Alena Arshinova, she was interviewed in December 2005 by Der Spiegel, a German news magazine.
