= Olga Medvedeva =

Russian handball player

Olga Medvedeva (born 22 March 1987) is a Russian team handball player from Astrakhan, former Junior World Champion for Russia, and currently playing for the Norwegian club Larvik HK.

== Club career ==
With Larvik HK Medvedeva won gold medals in the Norwegian top league in 2006/2007 and in 2007/2008, and also the cup in 2006/2007.

She won the Women's EHF Cup Winners' Cup in 2008 with Larvik HK.
