= Olga Pendleton =

American statistician

Olga J. Pendleton is an American statistician known for her research on road traffic safety and alcohol-impaired driving as a statistician at the Texas A&M Transportation Institute, and as a member of the "Zero Alcohol" committee of the National Research Council. She has also published highly-cited work on the geometric design of roads and, with Ronald R. Hocking, on multiple linear regression.

== Education ==
Pendleton did her undergraduate studies at the University of South Alabama. As Olga Pendleton Hackney, she did her graduate studies at Emory University. She earned a master's degree in 1973 with the thesis Periodic Regression Revisited (supervised by Yick-Kwong Chan) and completed her Ph.D. with the 1976 dissertation Hypothesis Testing In The General Linear Model.

== Career ==
Before working at the Texas Transportation Institute, Pendleton became an assistant professor at Mississippi State University, and then was associated with the University of Texas System Cancer Center, starting in 1980. As Olga J. Hocking and later Olga J. Herman, she has taught at Northern Michigan University since 2011.

== Recognition ==
She was elected as a Fellow of the American Statistical Association in 1991.
