= Olga Svinukhova =

Russian footballer (born 1969)

Personal information
- Full name: Olga Svinukhova
- Date of birth: 3 July 1969 (age 57)
- Place of birth: Russia
- Position: Goalkeeper

Senior career*
Years	Team	Apps	(Gls)
?-1993	Viktorya Stavropol		
1994-2006	Energiya Voronezh		
2007	Nadezhda Noginsk		
2008-2009	ShVSM Voronezh		
2010-2012	Energiya Voronezh		
- * Club domestic league appearances and goals

Olga Svinukhova is a retired Russian football goalkeeper, last played for Energiya Voronezh in the Russian Championship.

She was at 42 the team's most veteran player, having taken part in near to all its twelve titles between 1994 and 2003.

She has represented Russia at senior level.
