= Olga Nyblom =

Swedish artist

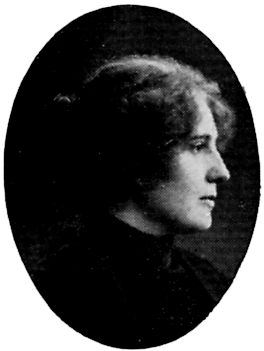
Olga Nyblom

Olga Nyblom was a Swedish artist (born 1872 in Gothenburg, Sweden, died 1955 in Nacka Municipality, Sweden) who specialized in oils, charcoals, pastels, and watercolor painting.

== Early life ==
Olga Nyblom studied at the Valand School in Gothenburg under Carl Larsson from 1891 to 1892. She later continued to study under Georg Pauli from 1894 to 1895. She married Lennart Nyblom (1872–1947), who was also an artist that worked in similar materials, and remained married until his death. She had 6 children with Lennart Nyblom, Staffan Nyblom (1901–1919), Peder Nyblom (1902–1981), Helena Nyblom (1903–1947), Maja Röhr (1904–1987), Hilde Nyblom (1908–2009) and Urban Nyblom (1913–1960).

== Career and works ==
After studying in Gothenburg, Nyblom went on to paint in Paris (1896 – 1897, returning again in 1903), Florence, Berlin, Dresden, and Vienna (1906). She participated in major Swedish exhibitions such as Hälsingborg in 1903, Norrköping in 1906, Lund in 1907, and Stockholm in 1911. She also shared in an exhibition with Gunnar Hallström in Stockholm in 1915. Some of her works are now exhibited in the National Museum in Sweden as well as the Waldemarsudde.

=== Subject matter ===
Many of Nyblom's works were of landscapes and on occasion people, however, there is no written record of who the people were. The landscapes were often of rolling hills, slanting trees down in browns and faded greens. Olga Nyblom also painted 'Flowers and vase' as a subject matter .
