= Bamboo weaving =

Type of bambooworking

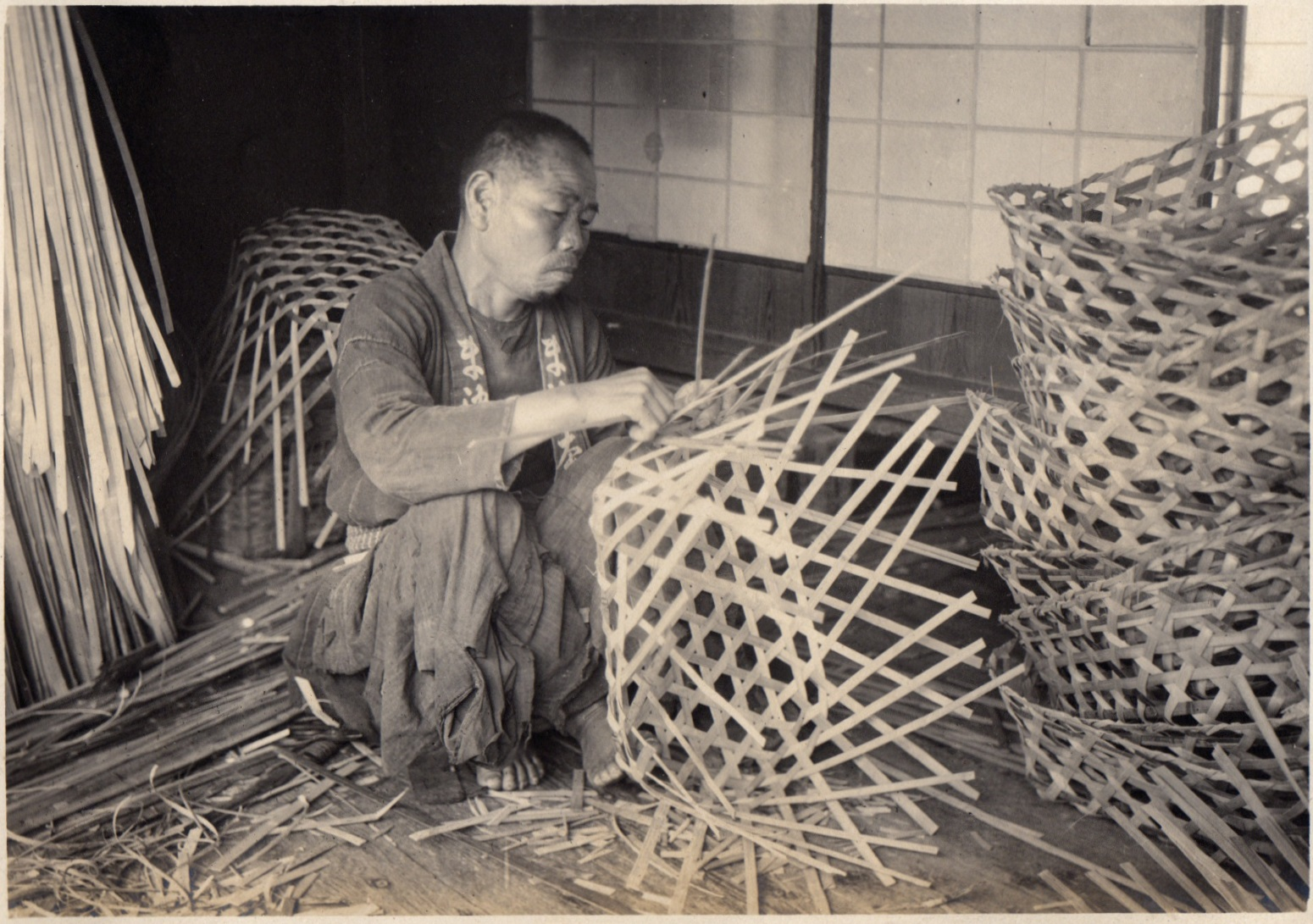
Japanese bamboo basket weaver working with kagome pattern (1915)

Bamboo weaving is a type of bambooworking in which two distinct sets of bamboo strips are interlaced at normally right angles to form an object. The longitudinal lengths of bamboo are called the warp and the lateral lengths are known as the weft (also known as 'woof', an archaic English word meaning "that which is woven"), (Note: Deriving from an obsolete past participle of weave (Oxford English Dictionary, see "weft" and "weave")) or filling. The method in which these strips are woven affects the characteristics of the finished piece.

Bamboo is typically hand-woven, with a number of bamboo weaving traditions having developed globally over time, particularly in Southeast Asia and East Asia, where bamboo suitable for weaving is particularly abundant.

== Types ==
- Chinese bamboo weaving
- Japanese bamboo weaving
- Korean sokuri
- Taiwanese bamboo weaving
- Jaapi (Assam, India)
- Olia (Odisha, India; grain storage basket)

== See also ==
- Wanchojang, a Korean style of sedge weaving
