= Olya =

Olya is a diminutive form of the first name Olga.

Olya may also refer to:

== People ==
- Olya Dubatova, Russian artist
- Olya Ivanisevic, Serbian fashion model
- Olya Kroytor, Russian artist
- Olya Polyakova, Ukrainian entertainer
- Olya Smeshlivaya, Russian snowboarder
- Olya Fomina, American musician
- Hasan Anami Olya, Iranian opera singer

== Other uses ==
- Olya, Russia, a rural locality (a selo) in Astrakhan Oblast, Russia
- Olya, Iran (disambiguation), several places in Iran
- Olya, meaning "Upper", a common element in Iranian place names; see
- "Olya", a song by the Ukrainian hard rock band Vopli Vidopliassova

== See also ==
- Olia (disambiguation)
- Olja, an alternate spelling
