= Japanese bamboo weaving =

Traditional Japanese craft

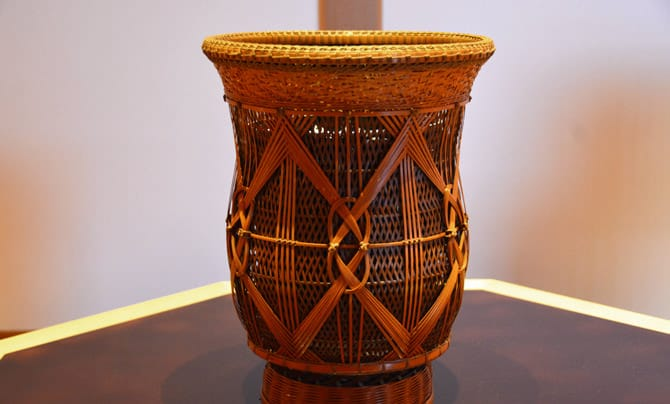
Woven bamboo flower basket (hanakago) for ikebana by Living National Treasure Hayakawa Shōkosai V, at the Kyoto State Guest House

Bamboo weaving (竹編み, takeami) is a form of bambooworking (竹細工, takezaiku) and a traditional Japanese craft (工芸, kōgei), with a range of different applications, weaving styles and appearances. Japanese bamboo weaving is particularly well known for its use in basket weaving.

== History ==
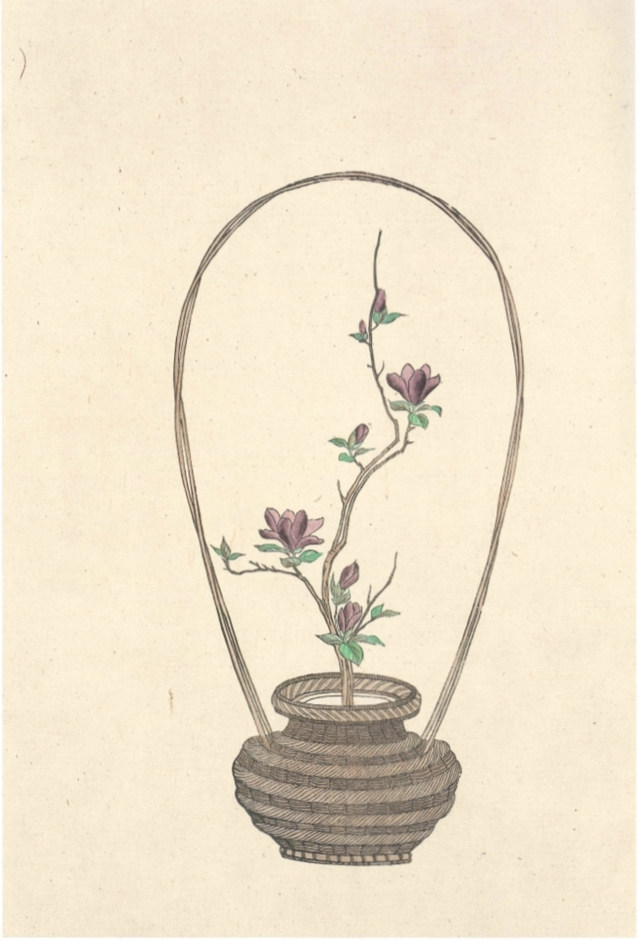
Ikebana shōka flower arrangement in bamboo basket, by 40th headmaster Ikenobō Senjō (from the Sōka Hyakki, 1820)

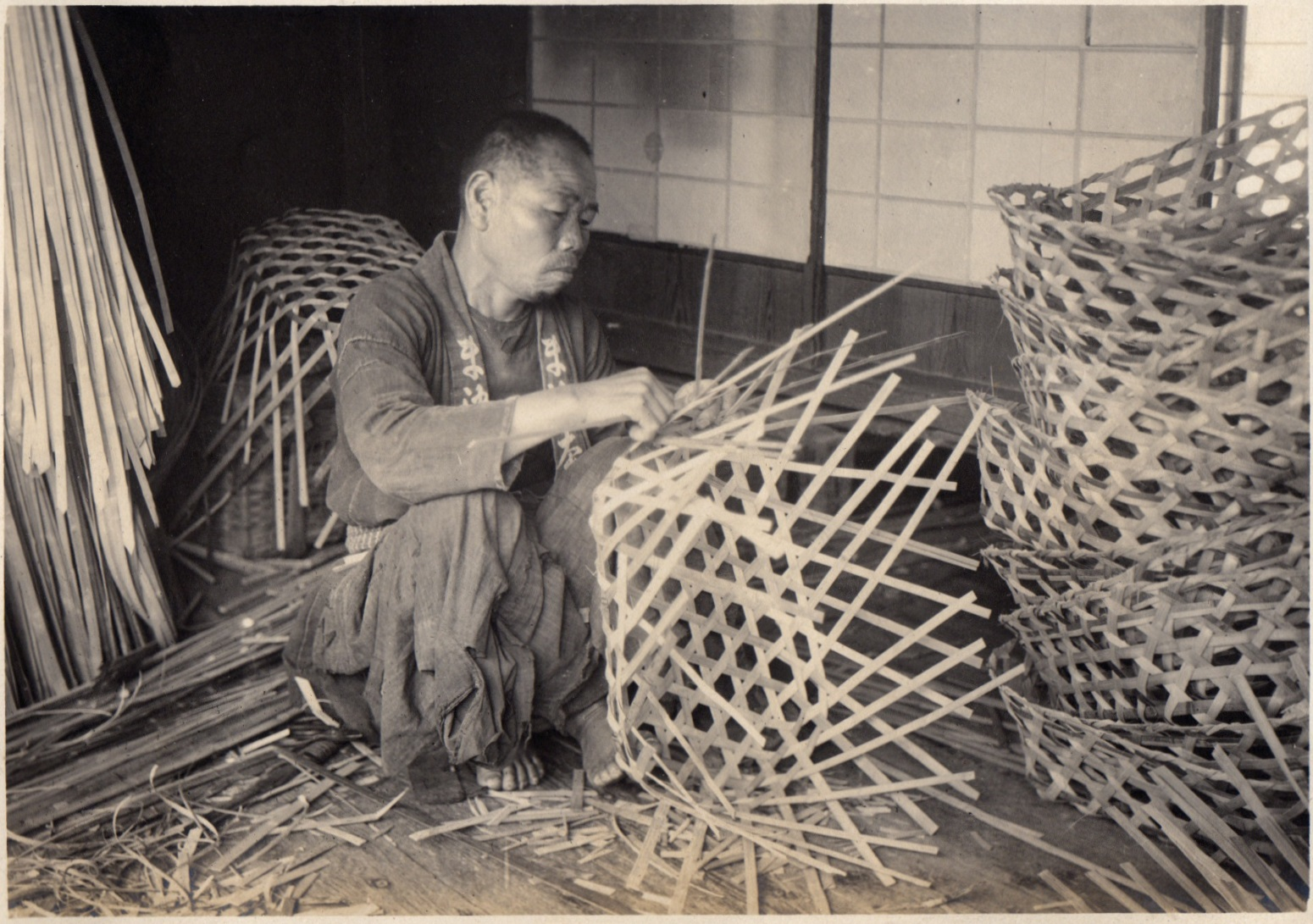
Basket weaver working with kagome pattern (1915)

More than six hundred species of bamboo, some endemic to the island, grow in Japan. Although defined as a subfamily of grasses, bamboo is characterized by its woody culm and a root system that can form either thick, slowly spreading clusters or more aggressive runners. Qualities such as the strength and flexibility of a bamboo variety differ widely, with some types considered more suitable for use in bamboo crafts than others. One such type especially used in bamboo weaving is Phyllostachys bambusoides, known as madake (真竹) or kashirodake (皮白竹), which is renowned for its combination of high strength and high flexibility.

Bamboo has characteristics which, over time, have led to its frequent usage in Japanese culture and the development of symbolism associated with its qualities. It is a fast-growing, straight-limbed and flexible plant, does not decay quickly once cut, and can be used for building shelters, weapons, instruments and containers. Young bamboo shoots, which are edible, form a part of traditional Japanese cuisine, and bamboo is a common theme in Japanese literature and painting.

Along with evergreen pine trees and plum blossoms – the first flower of spring – bamboo is a part of the traditional Three Friends of Winter motif, commonly seen on kimono worn for auspicious occasions as a symbol of perseverance and resilience. Japanese artists have often represented bamboo enduring inclement weather, such as rain or snow, reflecting its reputation for being flexible but unbreakable, and its association with steadfastness and loyalty.

Flower baskets for ikebana called hanakago (花籠) and other types were imported from China or their style copied. These karamono (唐物, lit. 'Chinese style') baskets had formal, symmetrical structures with tightly plaited weaves. It was the 16th century tea master Sen no Rikyū (1522–1591) who advocated for a simple, austere wabi-cha style with natural and spontaneous or seemingly artless utensils. These tea utensils established a Japanese bamboo art distinct from the imported Chinese style. Baskets were developed to appear in a natural, asymmetric style, called wamono (和物, lit. 'Japanese style'). Around 1700, the embrace of the steeped Japanese tea ceremony (sencha) coincided with a renewed admiration for Chinese culture, literature, and painting among the Japanese literati, a phenomenon that continued into the 19th century. Finely woven, elegant baskets imported from China served as models for karamono baskets now created by Japanese craftsmen, following a tradition established during the Muromachi period (1392–1573). Recognition of bamboo craftsmanship as a traditional Japanese decorative art began at the end of the 19th century, and became accepted as an art form.

The Bamboo Technical Training Support Centre in the town of Ōita was established in 1938, making it the only publicly funded prefectural-level institution in the country that is dedicated to bamboo crafts. Following World War II, bamboo crafts disappeared as plastic replaced it for utilitarian products. Nevertheless, high-level production remained and art forms developed apart from crafts. Bamboo art gained increasing recognition. In 1967, Shōnō Shōunsai (生野祥雲斎) (1904–1974) from Beppu became the first bamboo artist to be nominated by the government as a Living National Treasure. In 1979, the bamboo crafts of Beppu were designated by the Ministry of Economy, Trade and Industry in 1979 as a Traditional Arts and Crafts.

Most of the master artisans designated Living National Treasures are selected from among participants in the annual Japan Kōgei Association exhibitions. Whereas the annual Japan Art Academy exhibitions (Nitten (日展)) emphasize artistic expression, the Art and Crafts exhibitions prioritize the preservation of traditional skills and typically feature functional, though modern, baskets. In the postwar era, many of the leading bamboo artists were linked to established lineages. Although most artists are men, a number of female artists have emerged recently, such as Toshie Ōki (大木 淑恵) and Setsuko Isohi (磯飛 節子; b. 1964).

Bamboo art of recent decades, despite its practitioners holding the same respect for tradition and lineage as bamboo artists through history, reflects a greater diversity in technique and vision. Notable artists have come to the craft from outside the traditional family lines, and many work independently. Some have a background in the fine arts, while others found themselves attracted to the practice after having worked in an unrelated field.

As is similar in other Japanese crafts, the acquisition of knowledge usually involved a lengthy apprenticeship with the master of the workshop, often the father of the young disciple, in a system called shitei (師弟). Learning the basic skills and techniques generally takes five to ten years, but mastering them and developing an individual style can require decades. In previous centuries, a student apprenticed to a master would be required to work hard almost every day in exchange for little or no pay; an apprentice would live in their master's household and would also be expected to participate in household duties. Before beginning any training, an apprentice would be expected to simply observe their master and other more senior students at work; even older, more experienced students would typically learn through this method of observation. In more recent times, this method of apprenticeship has changed and is no longer typical or common, with students of bamboo weaving instead learning basic skills in technical schools, such as the centre in Ōita, before later going to a master.

While some bamboo works can be completed in several weeks, others take many months, and exhibition pieces often require longer, sometimes a year or two. Bamboo arts have a low profile compared to ceramics, mainly because of the comparatively low number of artisans, and the amount of time it takes to finish an object.

Bamboo basketry is often complemented with other materials such as rattan or hemp palm; basketry of only these materials also exist. Another is tsuruzaiku (つる細工), the craft of vine weaving, which is popular in many parts of the northern Tōhoku region, where bamboo is more scarce, specifically the weaving of akebia quinata, known as akebizaiku (アケビ細工).

The three main production areas of bamboo weaving are the western Kansai region around the cities of Osaka and Kyoto, the eastern Kantō region around Tokyo, and the southernmost island of Kyushu. Each have their own techniques and styles of weaving bamboo.

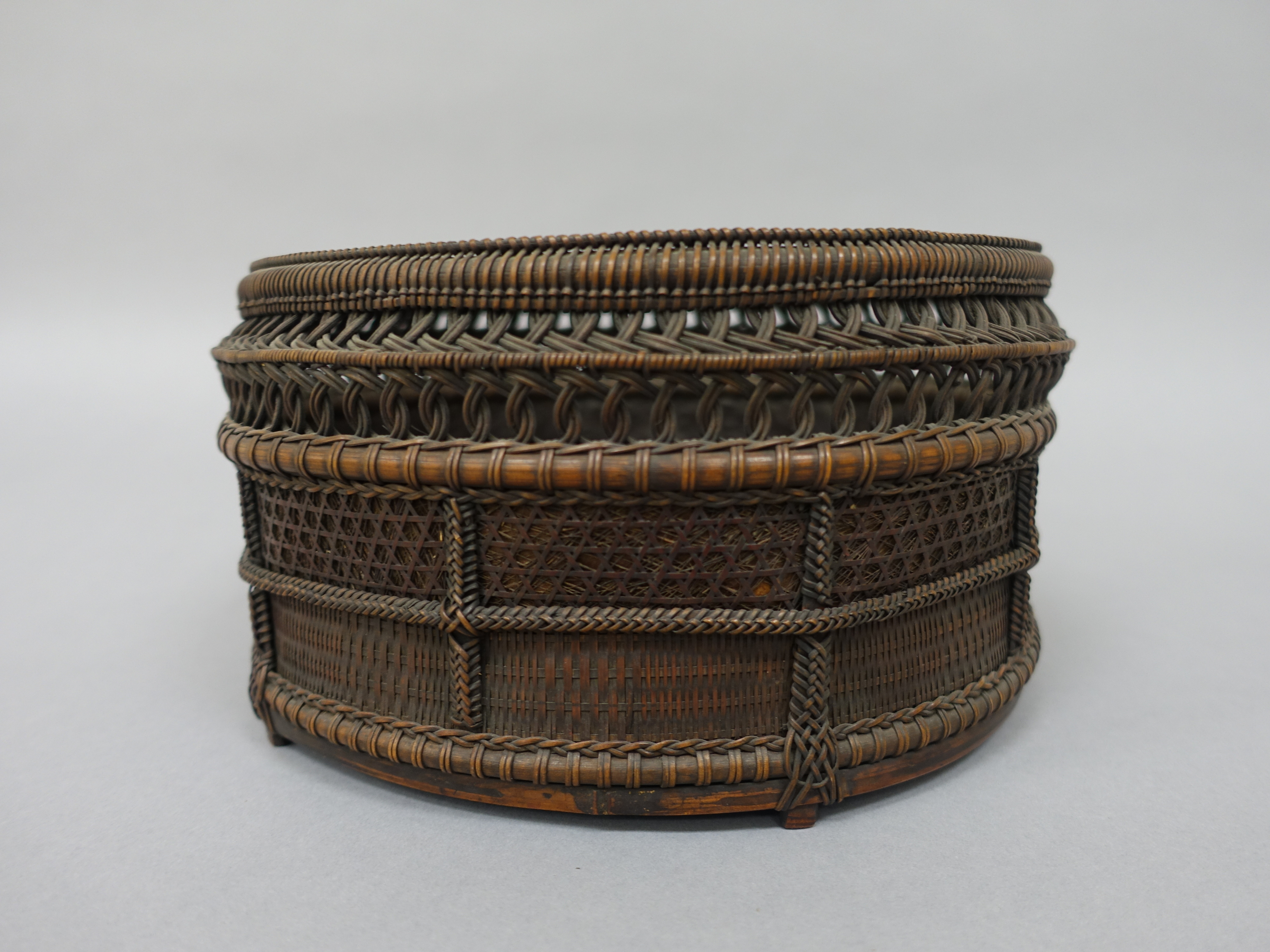
Chinese-style charcoal basket (sairō-sumitori) for Japanese tea ceremony. Timber bamboo, dwarf bamboo, and rattan. Edo period, 19th century

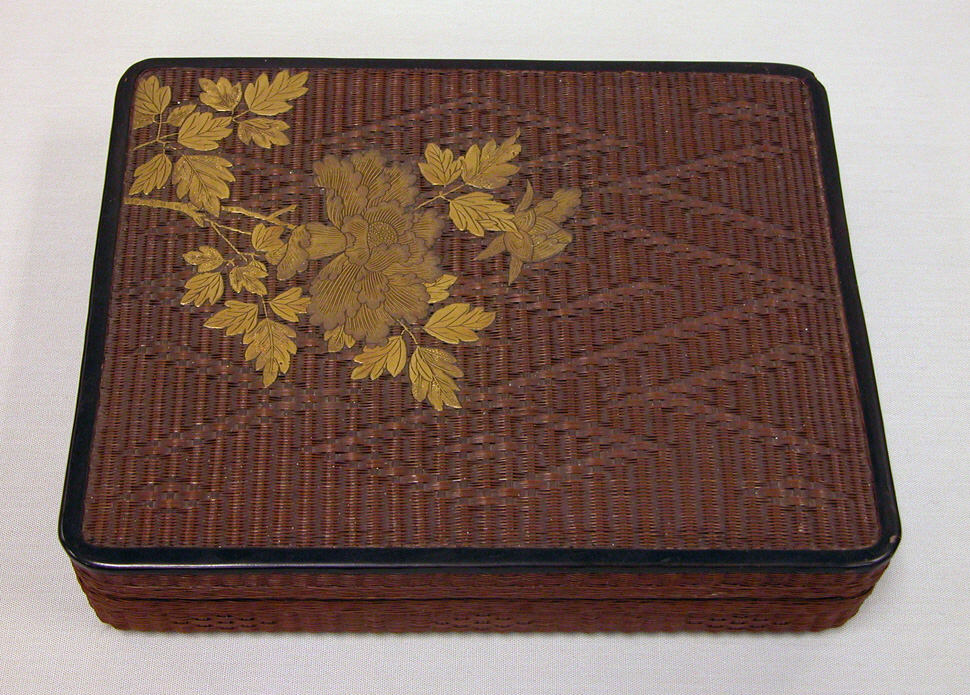
Basketwork box with peonies. Bamboo, lacquer, and gold hiramaki-e. Edo period, second half of 19th century

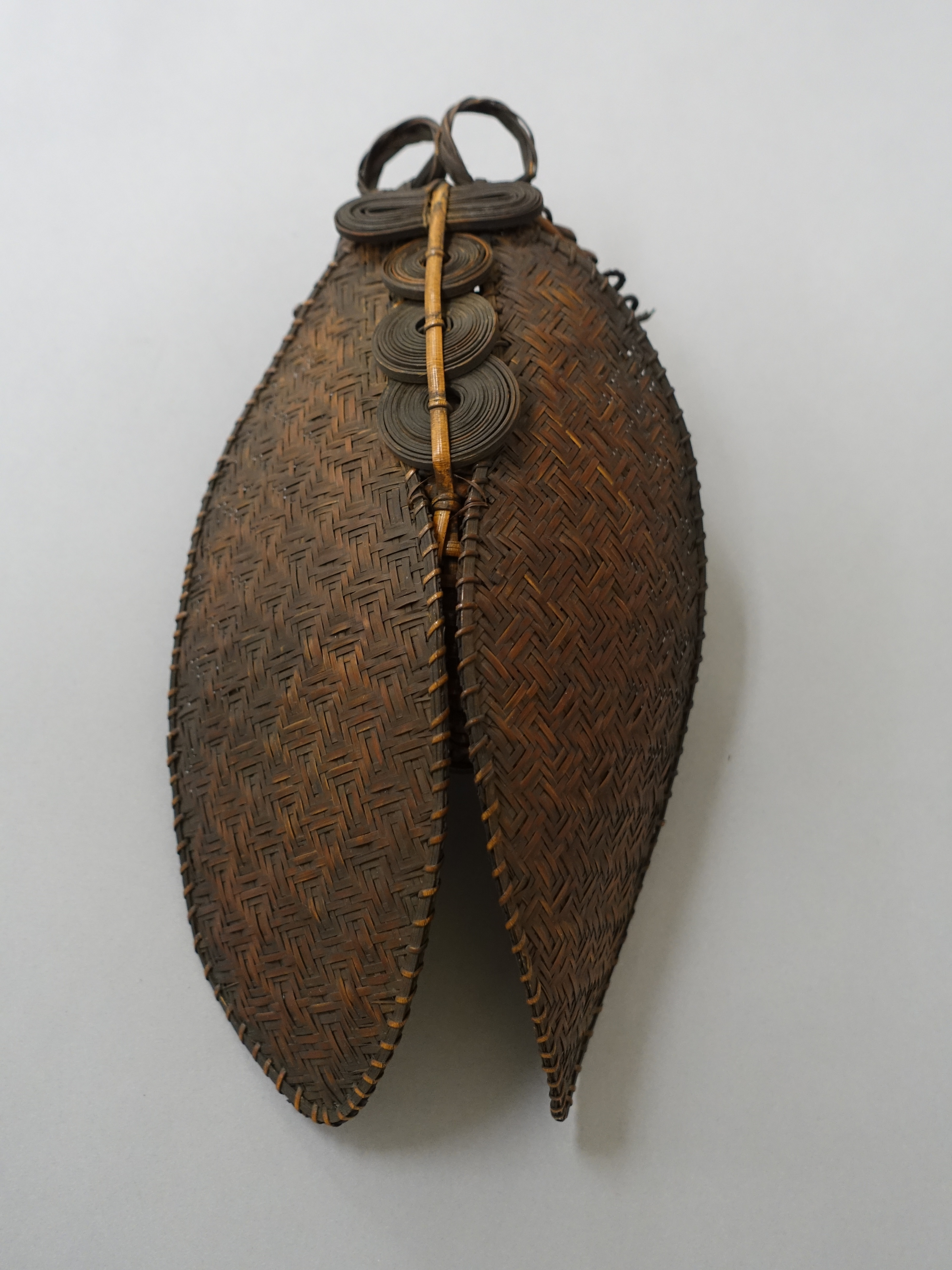
Hanging flower basket (kake-hanakago) in the shape of a cicada. Rattan. Edo period, 19th century

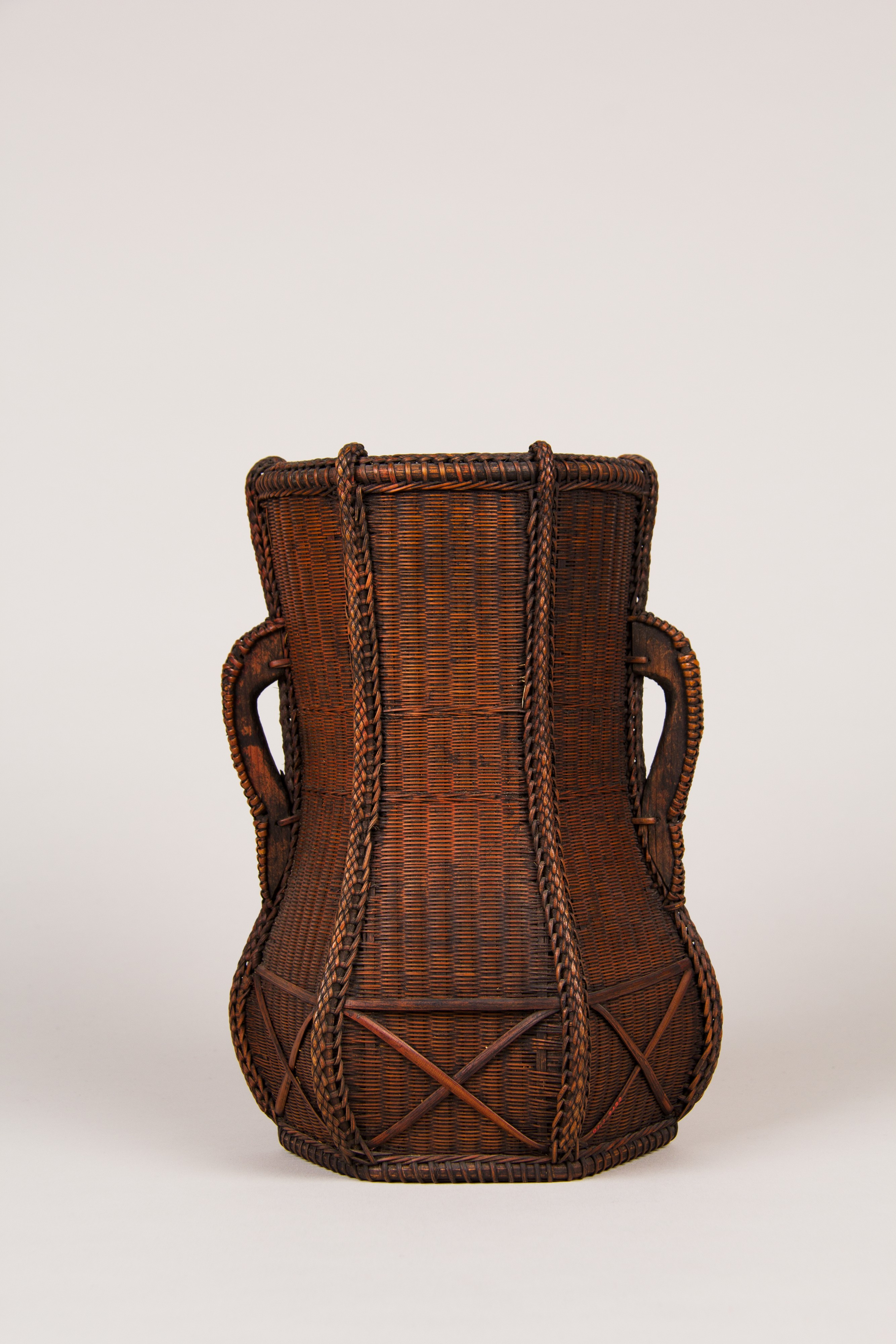
Flower basket. Bamboo. Edo period, second half of 19th century

=== Kansai artisans ===
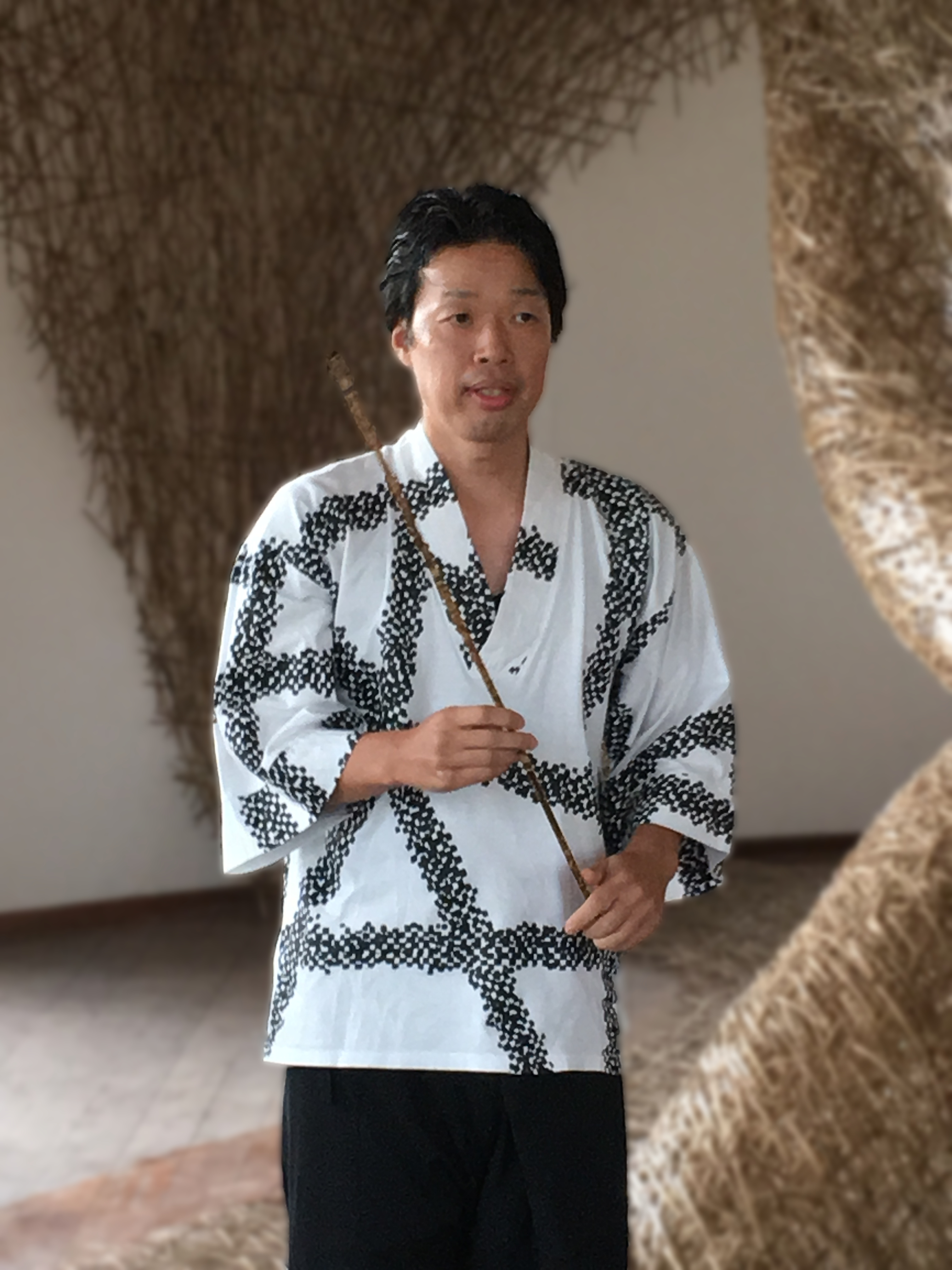
Tanabe Chikuunsai IV explaining his large-scale installation work Godai at the Musée Guimet (2016)

Of items woven from bamboo in Japan, sophisticated sencha flower baskets and tea utensil baskets were historically in especially high demand in the western region of Kansai, with Osaka and Kyoto at its centre. In the late 19th century, master craftsmen in the region began combining technical perfection with artistic individuality to produce functional "art baskets" that were signed by the artist. The pioneering Kansai bamboo artist Hayakawa Shōkosai I (早川尚古斎; 1815–1897), is believed to be the first master to have signed his baskets, studied the traditional craft of rattan plaiting, and concentrated on sencha tea utensils. His eldest son, Shōkōsai II (1860–1905), followed him into the basketry trade but died at an early age. He was succeeded by his younger brother, Shōkosai III (1864–1922), who developed an advanced style of plaiting called "coarse weave", a departure from the family's signature techniques. After World War II, Shōkōsai IV (1902–1975) moved from Osaka to Kyoto, where he established the new family workshop. Shōkōsai V (1932–2011) explored further possibilities in armor plaiting, a type of parallel construction considered one of the traditional Hayakawa techniques. He exhibited his work at the annual Japanese Traditional Art Crafts Exhibitions beginning in 1966 and was designated a Living National Treasure in 2003.

The Osaka-based bamboo artist Wada Waichisai I (和田和一斎; 1851–1901) established an important and long-lasting lineage of masters. He was known for his precise, delicate plaiting techniques, making primarily karamono (Chinese-style) baskets and utensils for the sencha tea ceremony. Among his numerous disciples was Tanabe Chikuunsai I (初代田辺竹雲斎; 1877–1937), who both perpetuated inherited traditions and began to modernize them. He developed the so-called ryūrikyō style of basketry after studying the 18th century paintings of Yanagisawa Kien, who often depicted bamboo baskets filled with flowers or fruits in the bunjin literati style. Chikuunsai made ryūrikyō baskets explicitly for exhibition, a trend that marked a significant shift in Japanese bamboo art, reflecting the ambition of master craftsmen to achieve the same degree of recognition already accorded contemporary ceramic and lacquer artists. Tanabe Chikuunsai II (1910–2000) and Chikuunsai III (1940–2014) extended the Tanabe lineage, with the latter producing unique geometric sculptures. The Sakai-based Tanabe Chikuunsai IV (b. 1973) has carried on the family tradition while also experimenting with monumental sculpture and organic installation works, such as the almost 6-metre (20 ft) high Godai at the Musée Guimet in 2016, or with The Gate in 2017 at the Metropolitan Museum of Art.

Another disciple of Wada Waichisai I was Yamamoto Chikuryūsai I (初代山本竹龍斎; 1868–1945), who received awards at the 1925 International Exhibition of Modern Decorative and Industrial Arts in Paris, the 1933 Century of Progress fair in Chicago, and the 1937 Exposition Internationale des Arts et Techniques dans la Vie Moderne in Paris. He was also one of the first bamboo craftsmen whose work was admitted to the Teiten exhibition of the Imperial Fine Arts Academy.

Maeda Chikubōsai I (初代前田竹房斎; 1872–1950), also from Sakai, established his own distinguished family line. He began his career producing karamono and literati baskets, but then developed a unique method of using natural bamboo branches and roots to achieve a more rustic effect. He also made several pieces for the Imperial Court. Chikubōsai II (1917–2003) produced both sencha baskets and modern vessels made from round strips of bent-and-gathered bamboo. Beginning in the Taishō period, both Tanabe Chikuunsai I and Maeda Chikubōsai I incorporated antique arrows into their work, which was particularly appreciated by clients who were descended from samurai. He was followed by his on Maeda Chikubōsai II (二代前田竹房斎; 1917–2003), whose works were shown at the Nitten and who in 1995 was awarded by the government as the third bamboo artist to be named a Living National Treasure.

One of the artists who was influenced by Tanabe Chikuunsai II is Sugita Jozan (b. 1932 in Osaka). Other notable artisans and artists include Suzuki Gengensai (鈴木玩々斎; 1891–1950), Higashi Takesonosai (東竹園斎; 1915–2006), who was influenced by Rōkansai and received the Special Recognition Award (Tokusen) at the 1971 Nitten exhibition, Tanaka Kōsai (田中篁斎; 1912–1993) whose also integrated the shafts of arrows into his work, Tanaka Kōji (田中耕司; b. 1941), and Tanioka Shigeo (谷岡茂男; b. 1949) who was an apprentice of Tanabe Chikuunsai II.

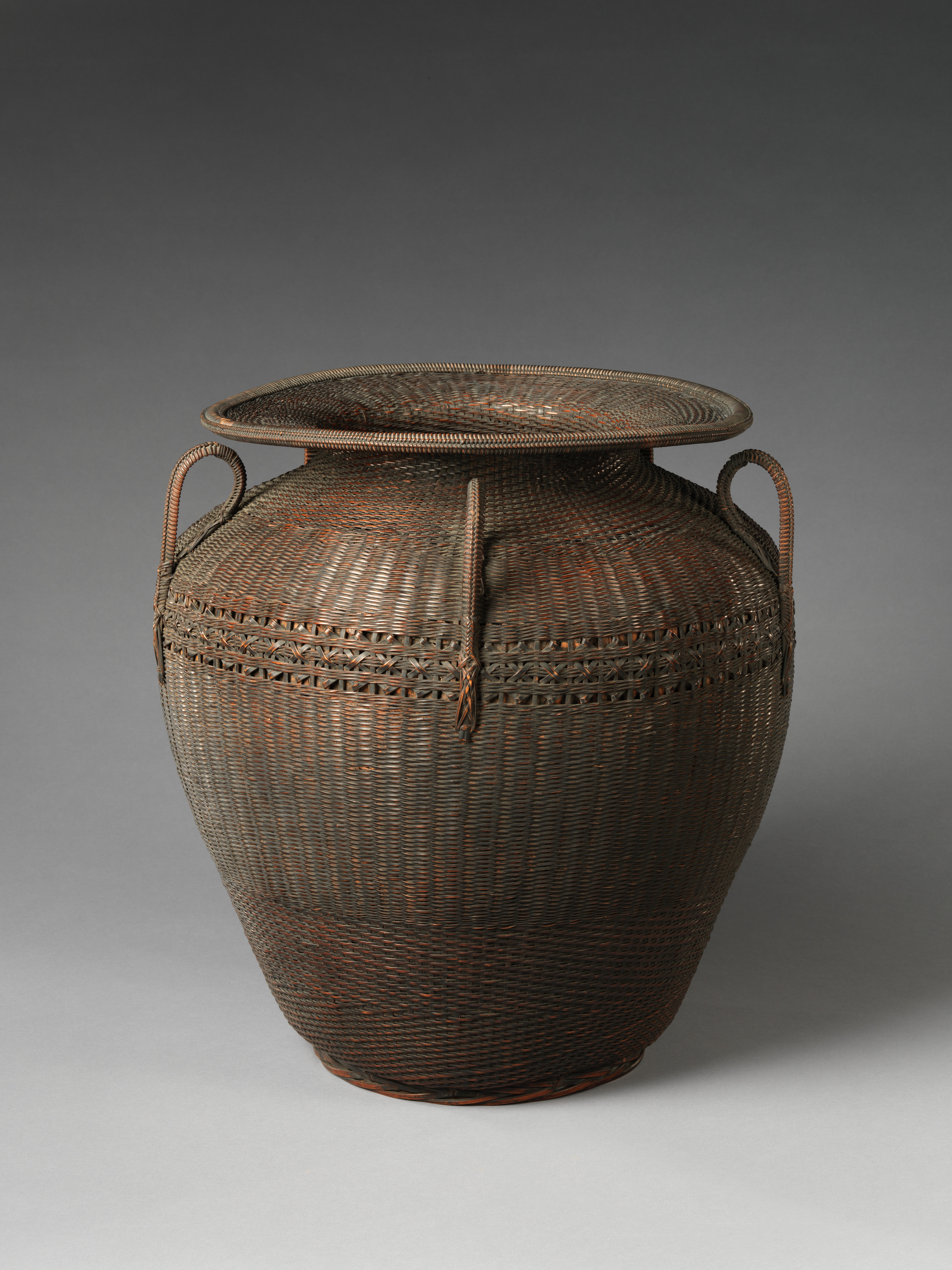
Large flower basket. Bamboo with rattan accents. By Hayakawa Shōkōsai I, second half of the 19th century

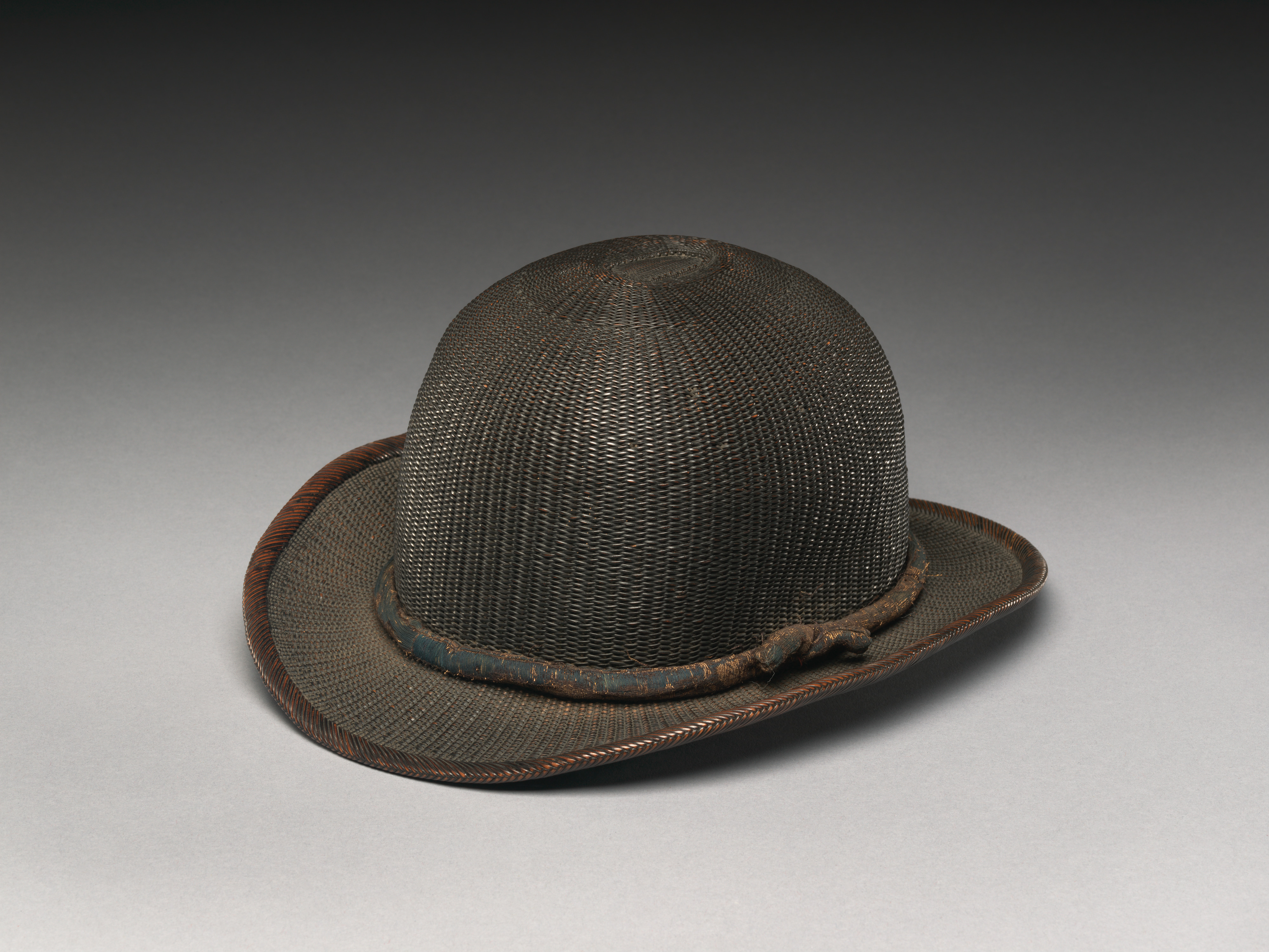
Bowler hat. Timber bamboo, rattan, and brocade silk. By Hayakawa Shōkosai I, Meiji era, c. 1880–1890

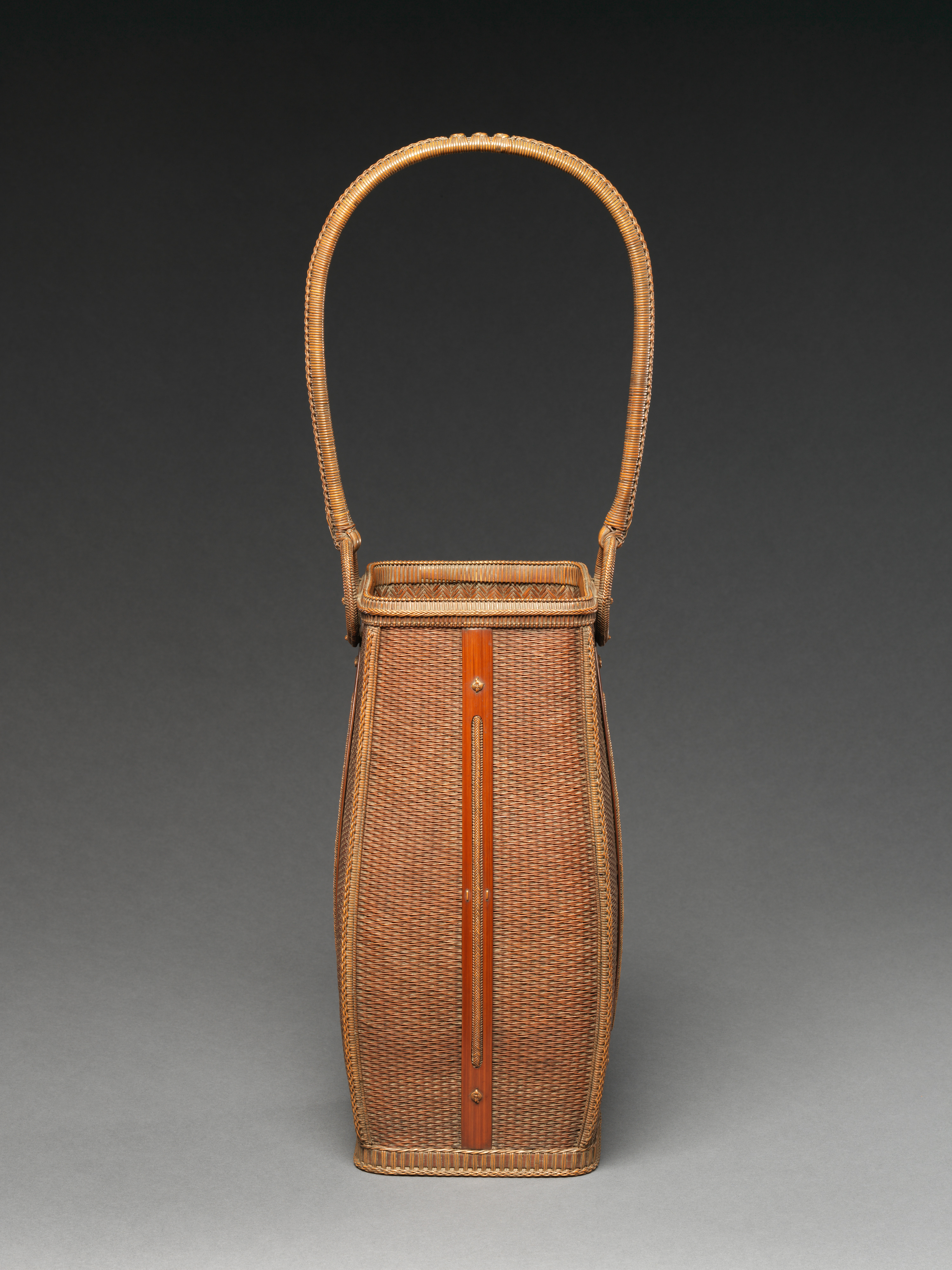
Karamono-style flower basket. Timber bamboo, rattan, and lacquer. By Wada Waichisai I, Meiji period, c. 1890–1901

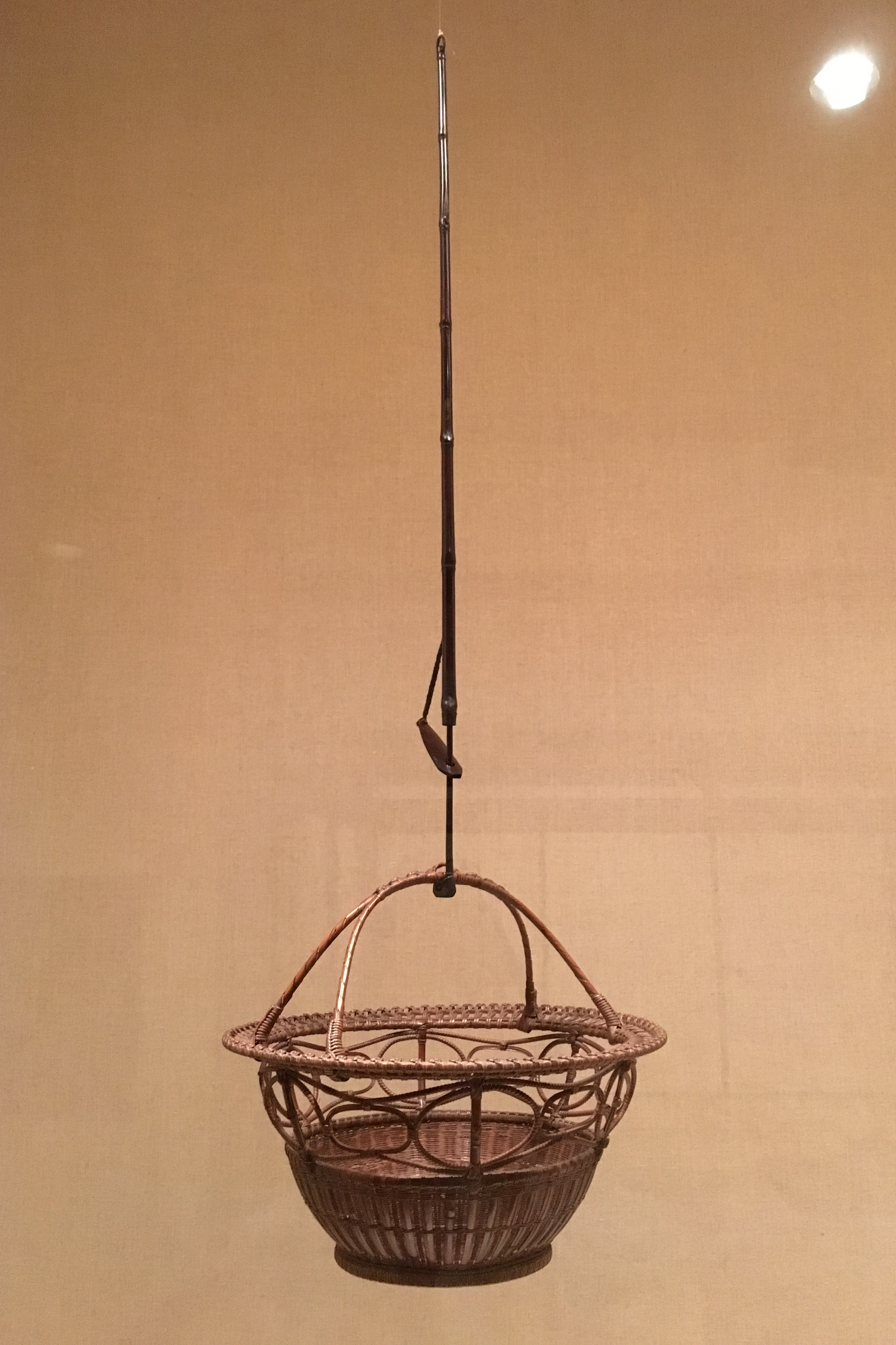
Ryūrikyō hanging flower basket. Smoked dwarf bamboo and rattan. By Tanabe Chikuunsai I, late Meiji–early Taishō period, c. 1900–1920

Monden Kōgyoku (門田篁玉; b. 1916) made thousands of utilitarian baskets for wholesalers for two decades after WWII. He later made a number of artistic pieces with extremely fine strips of bamboo and intricate techniques. He lives near Hiroshima in the neighbouring Chūgoku region.

=== Kantō artisans ===
Japanese bamboo art in the eastern region of Kantō around Tokyo underwent a process of modernization during the first half of the 20th century. Several masters rose to fame through their participation in newly reorganized domestic art international exhibitions and began producing "art baskets".

Iizuka Hōsai II (二代飯塚鳳斎; 1872–1934) and his brother Iizuka Rōkansai (飯塚琅玕斎; 1890–1958, born Yanosuke) spearheaded the movement, pioneering new directions for the field and elevating bamboo craft to an art form. Emphasizing artistic freedom and individuality, Rōkansai experimented with the possibilities of the medium and developed several new techniques, including bundled plaiting (tabane-ami) and embroidered plaiting (take sashi-ami). He received an award in the 1925 International Exhibition of Modern Decorative and Industrial Arts in Paris. Iizuka Shōkansai (飯塚小玕斎) (1919–2004), who trained under his father, the famous Rōkansai, regularly exhibited his works at the annual Nitten exhibition and the Traditional Art and Crafts exhibitions, and was designated a Living National Treasure in 1982. The Iizuka family traditions were transmitted to Katsushiro Sōhō (勝城蒼鳳) (b. 1934) and Fujinuma Noboru (藤沼昇) (b. 1945), both Living National Treasures active in Tochigi Prefecture.

Ishikawa Shōun (1895–1973) was a disciple of Iizuka Rōkansai, as was Yokota Hōsai (横田峰斎) (1899–1975). Hōsai was one of the seventeen founding members of the Japan Bamboo Artists Association in 1955, along with Kosuge Shōchikudo and Iizuka Shōkansai. Suzuki Kyokushōsai I (鈴木旭松斎, c. 1872–1936) might have been connected to the Hōsai lineage. Another disciple of Rōkansai was Nakata Kinseki (中田錦石) (1902–1959).

Buseki Suigetsu (武関翠月) (1930–2013) is an artist working in Tokyo.

Fujitsuka Shōsei (藤塚松星) (born 1949) had his apprenticeship under Baba Shōdō (1925–1996) and is based in Kanagawa. His produces installation art in a highly individualistic style.

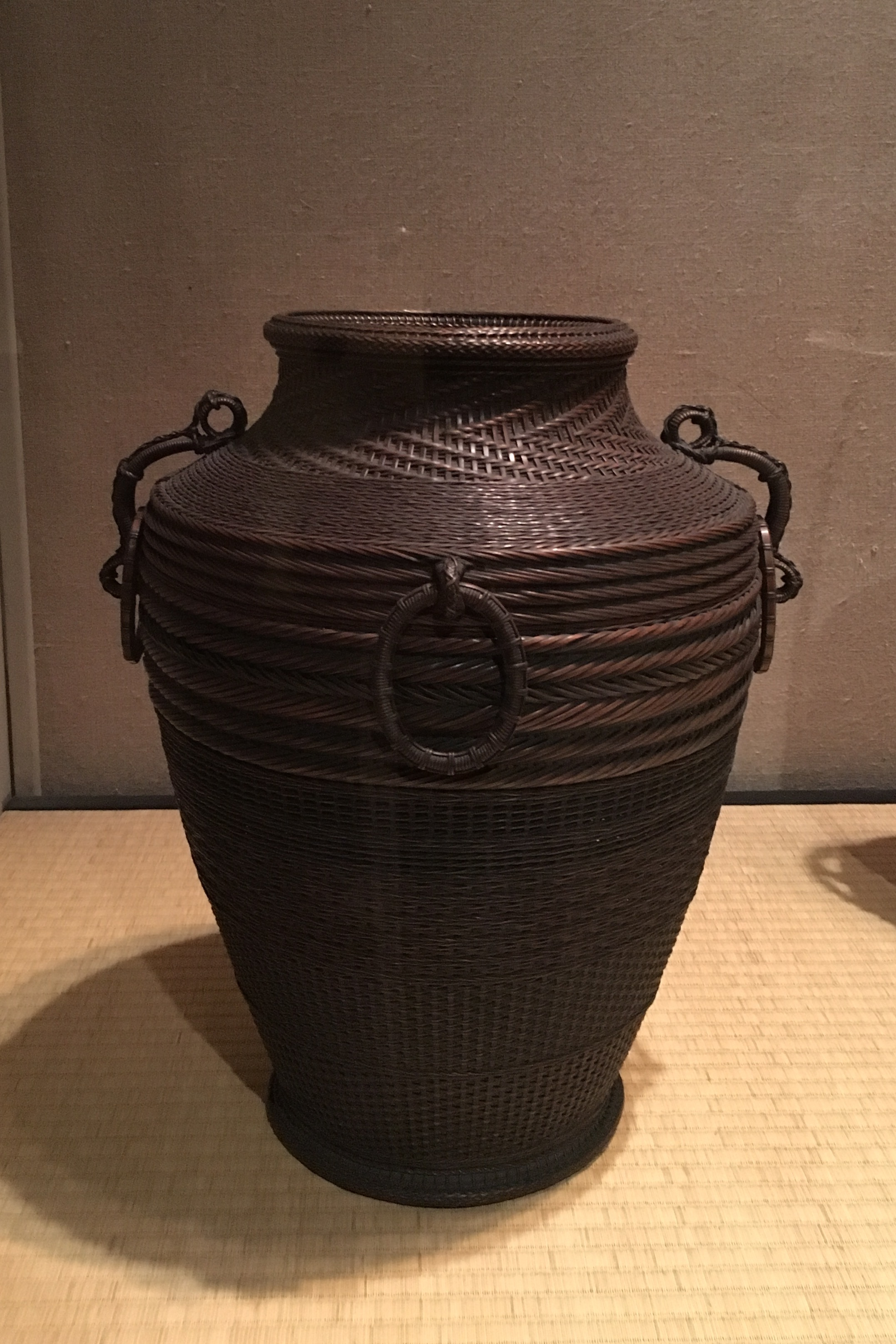
Large flower basket (hanakago). Timber bamboo, rattan, and lacquer. By Iizuka Hōsai II, Meiji era, c. 1910

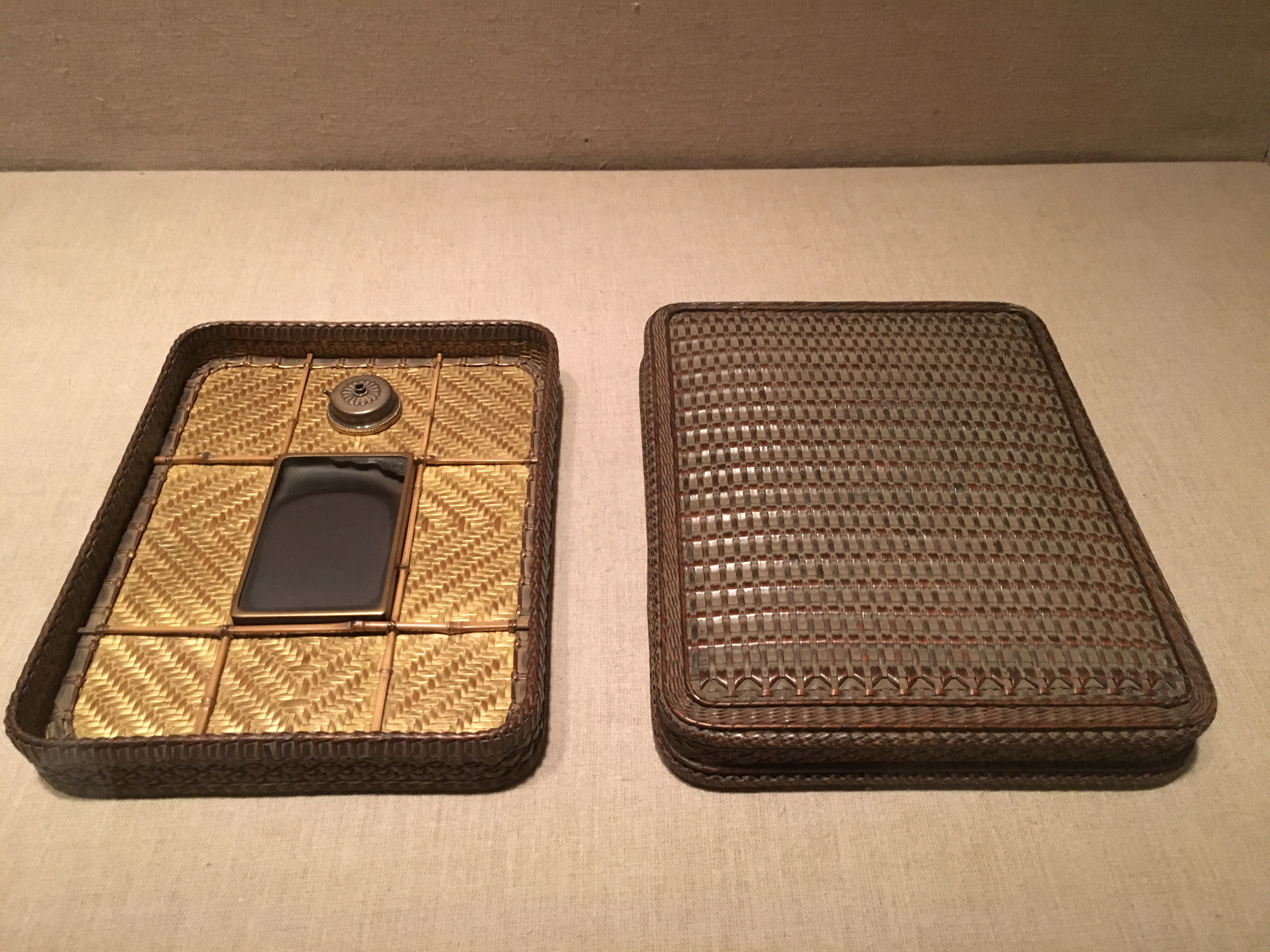
Inkstone box (suzuribako). Timber bamboo, rattan, lacquer, and gold powder. By Iizuka Hōsai II, Taishō period, 1923

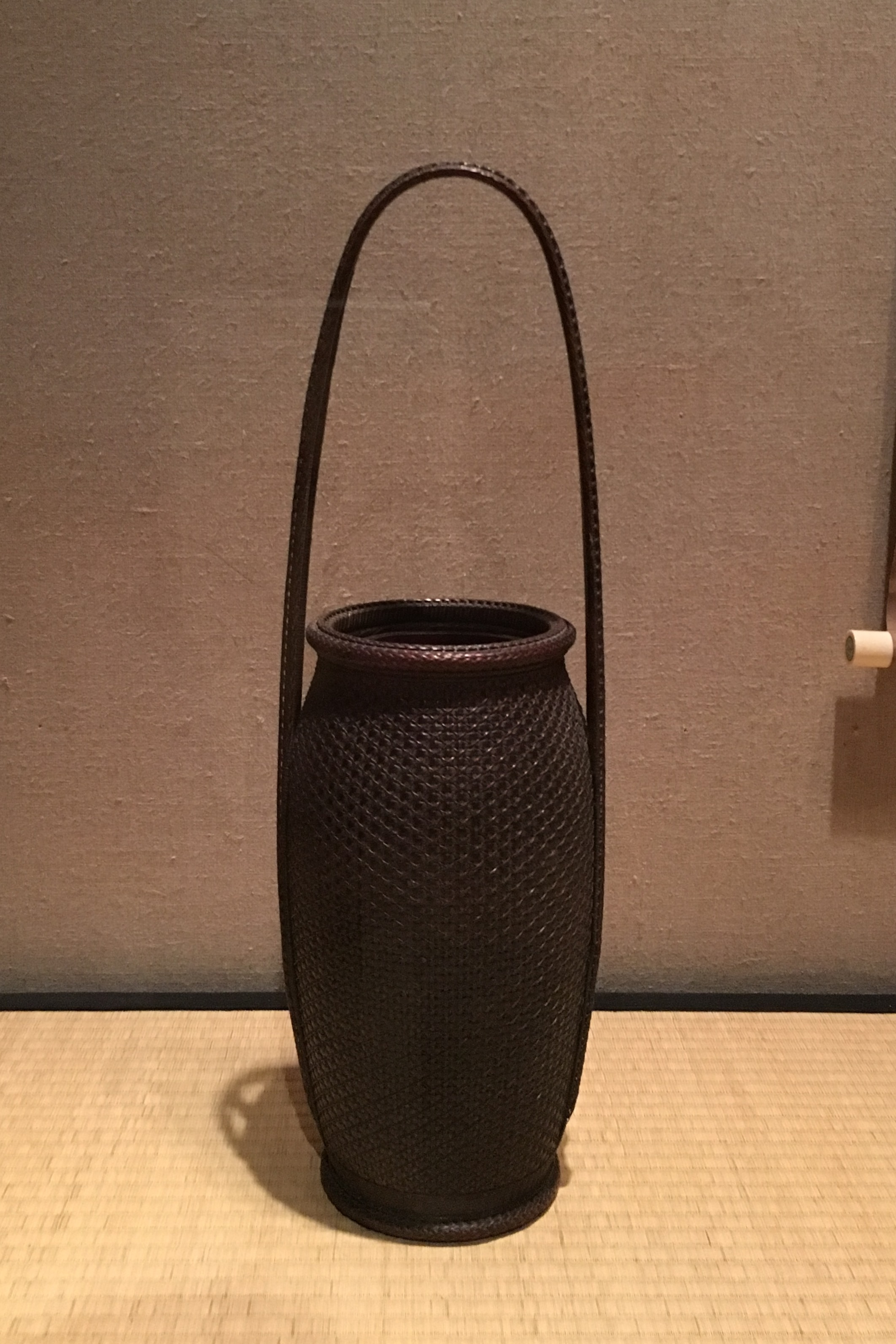
Flower basket (hanakago). Purple smoked timber bamboo, rattan, and lacquer. By Iizuka Hōsai II, Shōwa period, c. 1924–1934

=== Chūbu artisans ===
An important Chūbu lineage, specifically in the Hokuriku region, is that of Honma Kazuaki (本間一秋) (b. 1930), from Sado Island and based in Niigata Prefecture. He studied under Hayashi Shōgetsusai (林尚月斎) (1911–1986) He specializes in bent-bamboo works and has won renown for his large-scale abstract compositions. He further developed Iizuka Shōkansai's idea of two-dimensional, framed bamboo works called "plaited paintings" and received two Special Recognition Awards (Tokusen) at the Nitten, one in 1983.

His disciple Honma Hideaki (本間秀昭) (b. 1959), working on Sado Island, employs a flexible local variety of bamboo in works inspired by the island's flora and fauna. Another disciple of Honma Kazuaki was Ueno Masao (born 1949) from Iiyama, Nagano, who creates installation works.

Another important lineage on Sado Island was founded by Kosuge Chikudō (1895–1966), continued by his sons Kosuge Shōchikudō (小管小竹堂) (1921–2003) and Kosuge Kōgetsu (小菅吼月) (b. 1932).

Shōchikudō initially had no interest in becoming a bamboo artist and did not formally study under his father. He nevertheless submitted a work which was accepted by the Tokyo Craft Arts Exhibition when he was fourteen years old. Subsequently, he worked with bamboo and after the end World War II, the Niigata Prefectural government hired him to teach bamboo basketry. His work was admitted to the Nitten exhibitions, and in 1955 he became one of the seventeen founding members of the Japan Bamboo Artists Association. He eventually stopped producing works for public exhibitions and focused towards design and small items, working for example together with fashion designer Issey Miyake. Baba Shōdō (1925–1996) was trained by him.

His younger brother Kōgetsu, a student of chanoyu, became renowned for the "twisted construction" (hineri-gumi) technique. He participated in both the Nitten and the Traditional Arts & Crafts exhibitions and received awards for his flower baskets.

Torii Ippō (鳥居一峯) (1930–2011), born in Nishio, Aichi, had to continue his family's bamboo business at the age of 21 after his father died. In 1959 he saw a ceremonial bamboo basket from the 8th century CE at the Shōsōin in Nara. Inspired by this piece, he eventually submitted works to the Japanese Modern Art & Craft exhibitions and received a Special Recognition Award (Tokusen) at the 2006 Nitten.

Yako Hōdō (八子鳳堂) (b. 1940), originally based in Niigata Prefecture, studied under Nakajima Hoso, Nakamura Yukosai, and Baba Shōdō (1925–1996), who encouraged him to explore contemporary sculpture. He moved to the Tokyo area later, and made large-scale compositions for which he earned recognition. He began exhibiting his work at the Nitten in 1973.

Nagakura Ken'ichi (長倉健一) (b. 1952) is an artist from Shizuoka Prefecture. He initially studied yūzen dyeing techniques, but moved to bamboo weaving after working at his grandfather's bamboo wholesale enterprise. His organic, sculptural baskets and three-dimensional abstract sculptural works owe their appearance to a variety of traditions. He works as an independent artist and is not associated with any particular organisations.

=== Kyūshū artisans ===
With a warm southern climate ideal for bamboo cultivation, the island of Kyūshū is the site of more than half of Japan's bamboo production. In the early 20th century, the town of Beppu in Ōita Prefecture, famous for its hot springs, became a noted centre of bamboo crafts; functional baskets and bamboo carvings from the area were widely exhibited. The Ōita Prefectural Bamboo Craft and Technical Training Support Center, a publicly funded institution dedicated to bamboo craft, was established in 1938.

The artist Shōnō Shōunsai (山野祥云斋) (1904–1974) attracted numerous disciples over the course of his long career. His abstract bamboo sculptures of the 1950s and 1960s were considered revolutionary. In 1967 he became the first bamboo artist honoured with the title "Living National Treasure". Shōnō Tokuzō (生野徳三) (b. 1942), his son and heir to the family tradition, typically uses leached bamboo split into wide strips and combines parallel construction with plaiting to achieve a textural, multilayered effect.

Iwao Kōunsai (1901–1992) established a lineage that included Kadota Nikō (門田二篁) (1907–1994), who applied characteristic Kyūshū techniques, and Honda Shōryū (本田聖流) (b. 1951), one of his pupils, who makes undulating, complex sculptures with light, openwork textiles. Kibe Seihō (岐部笙芳) (b. 1951), one of Shōryū's students, prefers functional vessels and employs classical plaiting techniques. Other artists such as Uematsu Chikuyū (植松竹邑) (b. 1947) and Shiotsuki Juran (塩月寿藍) (b. 1948) create unique sculptures.

== Techniques ==
Kagome trihexagonal tiling pattern

Sensuji gumi (lit., 'thousand-line') construction, or comb plaiting

A number of bamboo plaiting and weaving techniques have developed in Japan in different regions throughout time. There are a number of standard weaving patterns, out of which hundreds of combinations can be made.

- Chrysanthemum base plaiting (kiku zoko ami (菊底編み))
- Circular plaiting (including the techniques known as rinko ami (輪弧編み), amida ko ami (阿弥陀光編み) and ja no me ami (蛇の目編み)), known collectively as maru jinku ami (丸じんく編み) in Western Japan. This technique is sometimes translated as 'bull's-eye plaiting' or 'snake-eye plaiting'.
- Clematis plaiting (tessen ami (鉄線編み), kikko ami (亀甲編み)), a variation of hexagonal plaiting
- Compound lozenge plaiting (sashi hishime ami (差し菱目編み), known as yotsume gaeshi (四つ目返し) in Western Japan)
- Diamond twill plaiting (masu ajiro ami (枡網代編み)), known as floral twill plaiting (hana ajiro ami (花網代編み)) when repeatedly used as design over a large area.
- Hemp leaf plaiting (asa no ha ami (麻の葉編み)), known as asa ami (麻編み) or uroko ami (鱗編み) in Western Japan
- Hexagonal plaiting (mutsume ami (六つ目編み), kagome ami (籠目編み), also known as kikko ami (亀甲編み) in Western Japan)
- Irregular plaiting (midare ami (乱れ編み) or hyoretsu ami (氷裂編) in Western Japan, also known as yatara ami (やたら編み) or ochimatsuba ami (落松葉編み) in Kyushu)
- Mat plaiting or simple plaiting (gozame ami (ござ目編み), also known as nuki ami (ぬき編み) in Western Japan)
- Octagonal plaiting (yatsume ami (八つ目編み))
- Pine needle plaiting (matsuba ami (松葉編み)), called "waive plaiting" (seikai ami (青海編み)) when same orientation is used for every row
- Plover plaiting (chidori ami (千鳥編み), chidori gake ami (千鳥掛け編み), ami sugari (編みすがり))
- Square plaiting, or cross pattern (yotsume ami (四つ目編み))
- Thousand-line construction, or comb plaiting (sensuji gumi (千筋組), kushime ami (櫛目編み)). Technically not plaiting, but aligning elements parallel to each other and then fastening them with any of the above methods. Also known as "parallel construction" (kumi (組)).
- Twill plaiting, or netting plaiting (ajiro ami (網代編み))
- Twining (nawame ami (縄目編み))

== Bamboo weaving in art ==
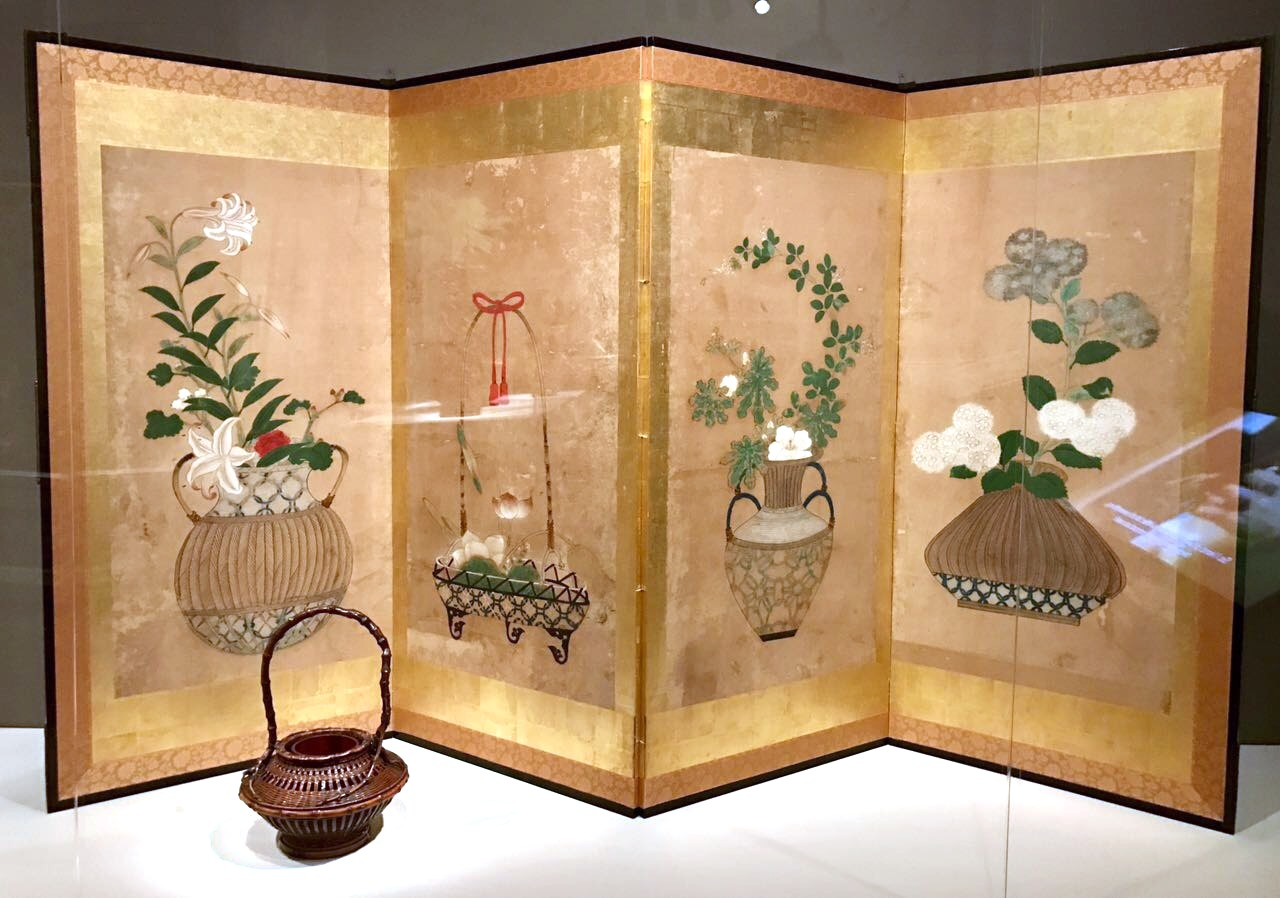
Woven bamboo flower basket from 1892–1950 by Maeda Chikubōsai I, in front of a byōbu (Edo period, 1650–1750) depicting four flower arrangements in baskets

Both bamboo and bamboo weaving in particular are a commonly depicted theme in many traditional Japanese artforms.

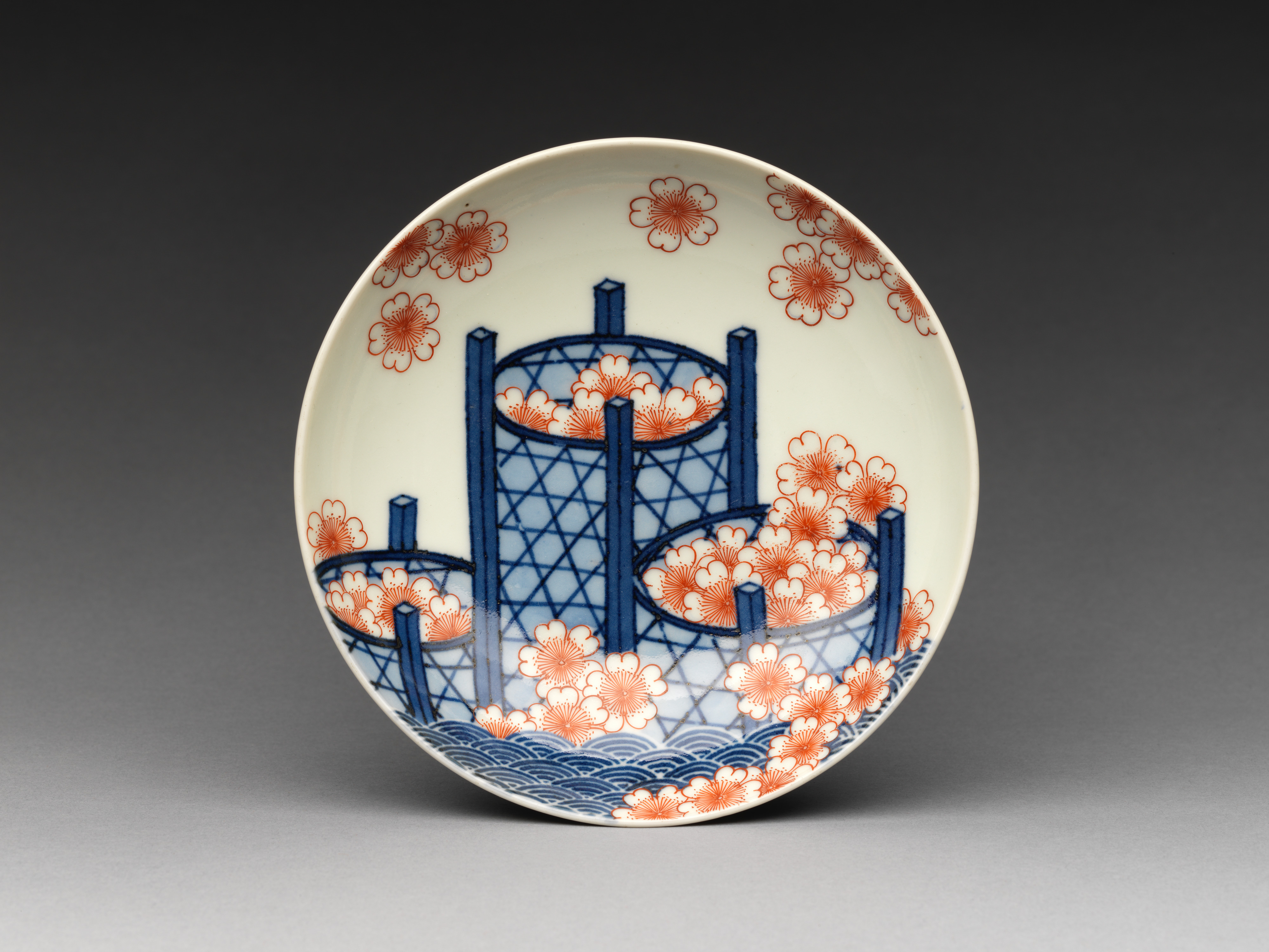
The design on this Nabeshima ware porcelain dish from the late 17th to early 18th century depicts falling cherry blossoms in woven bamboo baskets, floating along a stream.

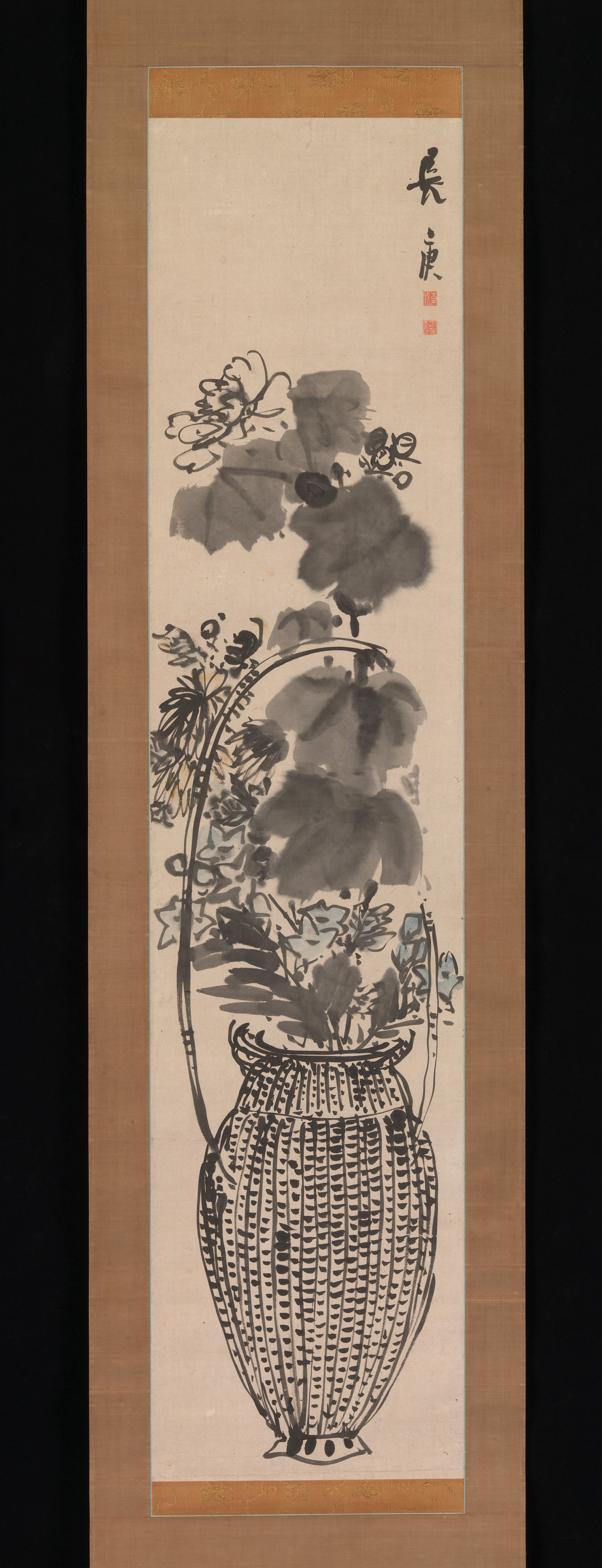
In the kakejiku (hung scroll), Autumn Flowers in a Bamboo Basket by Nanga artist Yosa Buson (1716–1783), a bouquet of autumn flowers are depicted in a tall Chinese-style bamboo basket with a rounded handle. The depicted flowers are chrysanthemums (kiku), Chinese bellflowers (kikyō), and rose mallows (fuyō), autumnal flowers meant to represent the season. The flowers are depicted in the sumi-nijimi, or "ink blurring", style, creating a soft texture.

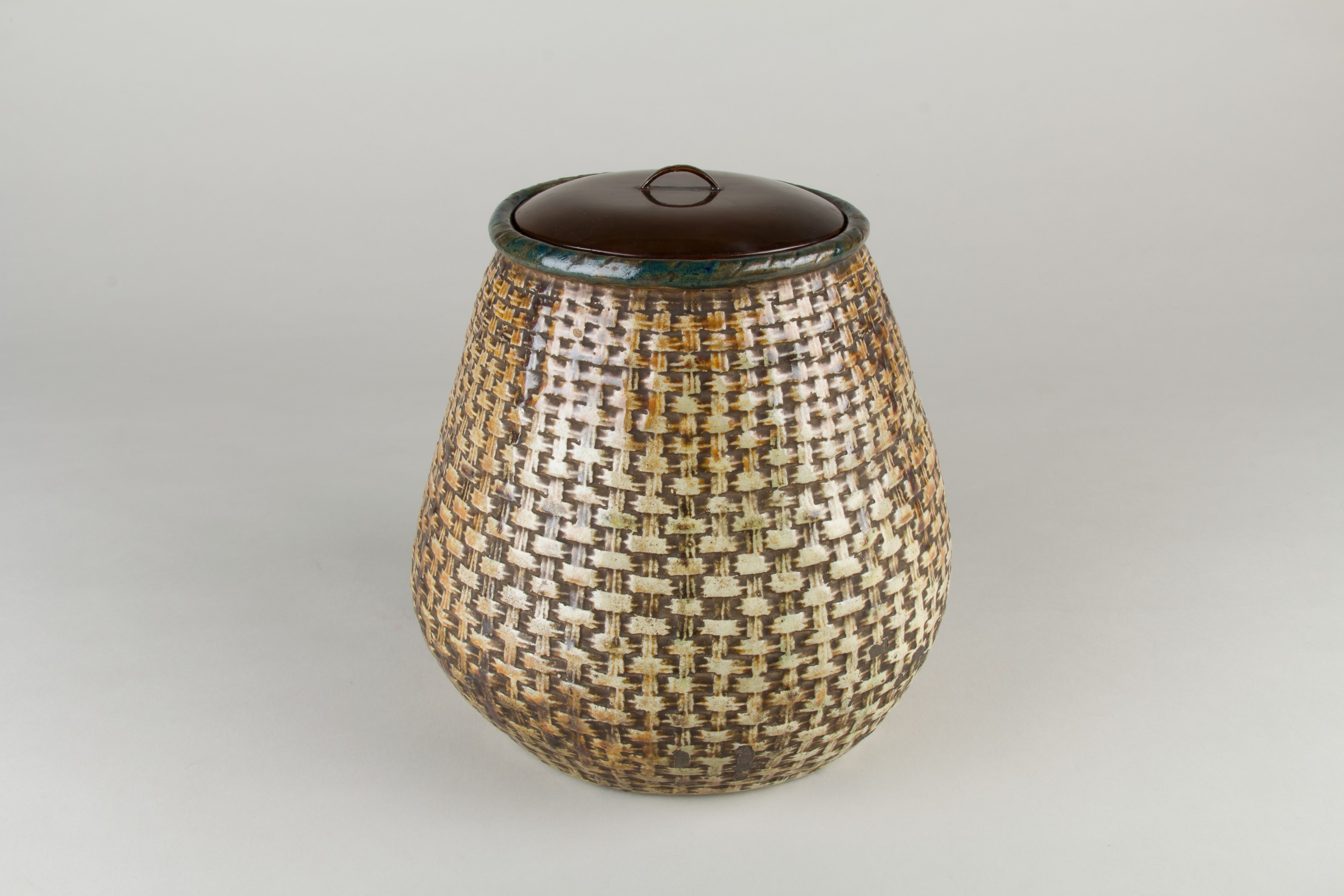
Another item depicting or imitating a woven bamboo piece is this mizusashi tea ceremony water jar, c. 1750–1850 (Edo period), which takes the shape of a bamboo basket. The jar is stoneware, with a cream slip and brown glaze, the texture of woven bamboo pressed into the jar.

== See also ==
- Chinese bamboo weaving
- Taiwanese bamboo weaving
- Wanchojang in Korea
