= Olia (disambiguation) =

Olia is a closed vessel made up of straw or bamboo.

Olia may also refer to:

- Ontologies of Linguistic Annotation (OLiA)
- Olia Chain, a hill chain in Australia

== People with the given name ==
- Olia Berger (born 1983), female judoka from Canada
- Olia Burtaev (born 1995), Australian synchronised swimmer
- Olia Hercules (born 1984), Ukrainian chef, food writer and food stylist
- Olia Lialina (born 1971), Russian internet artist and theorist, experimental film and video critic
- Olia Mishchenko (born 1980), Canadian artist
- Olia Tira (born 1988), Moldovan singer

== See also ==
- Olya (disambiguation)
- Auliya (disambiguation)
