= Sokuri =

Basket used in Korean cuisine

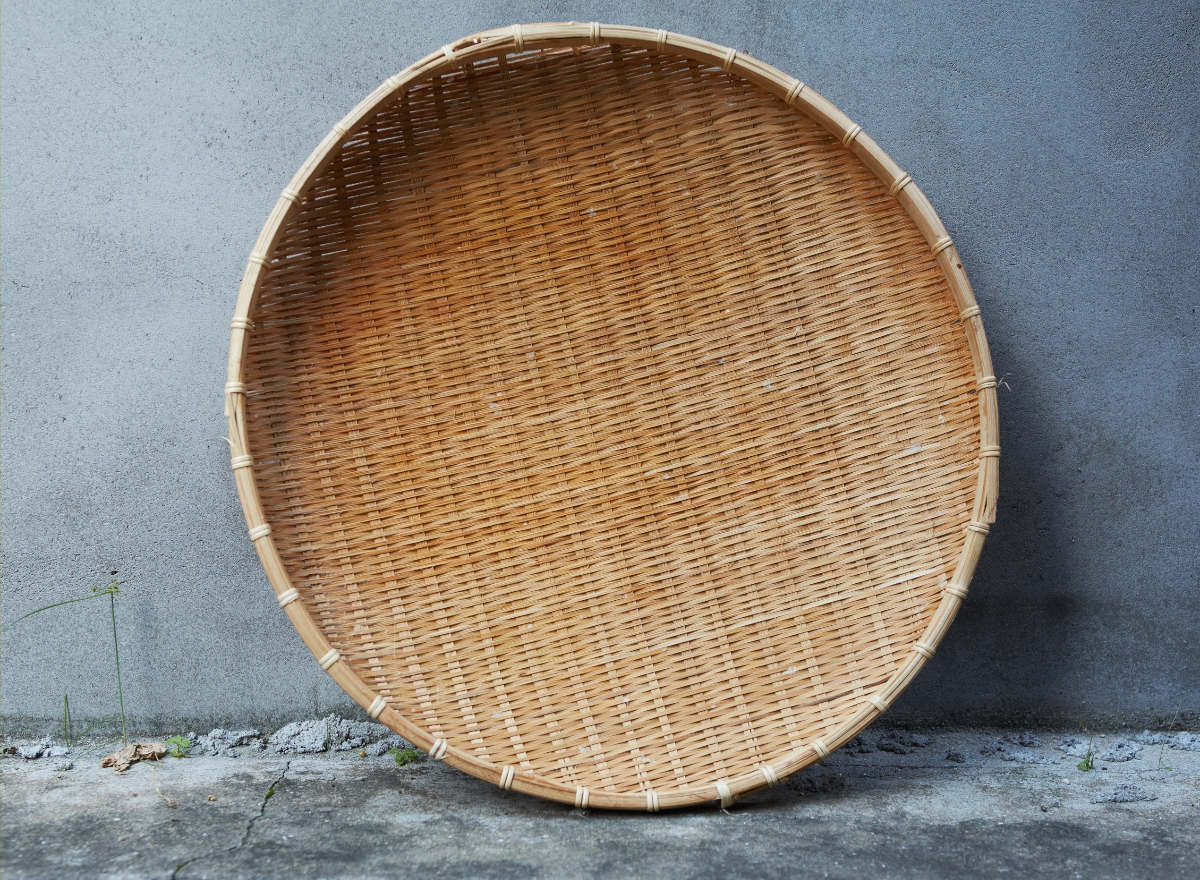
A sokuri woven basket

Sokuri (Korean: 소쿠리, pronounced [so.kʰu.ɾi]) is a round, rimmed woven basket made of finely-split bamboo. It is used for straining washed grains, drying vegetables, or draining fried food in Korea.

It measures between 25 and 50 cm in diameter, and has a standing contour measuring some 4 cm.

== Gallery ==
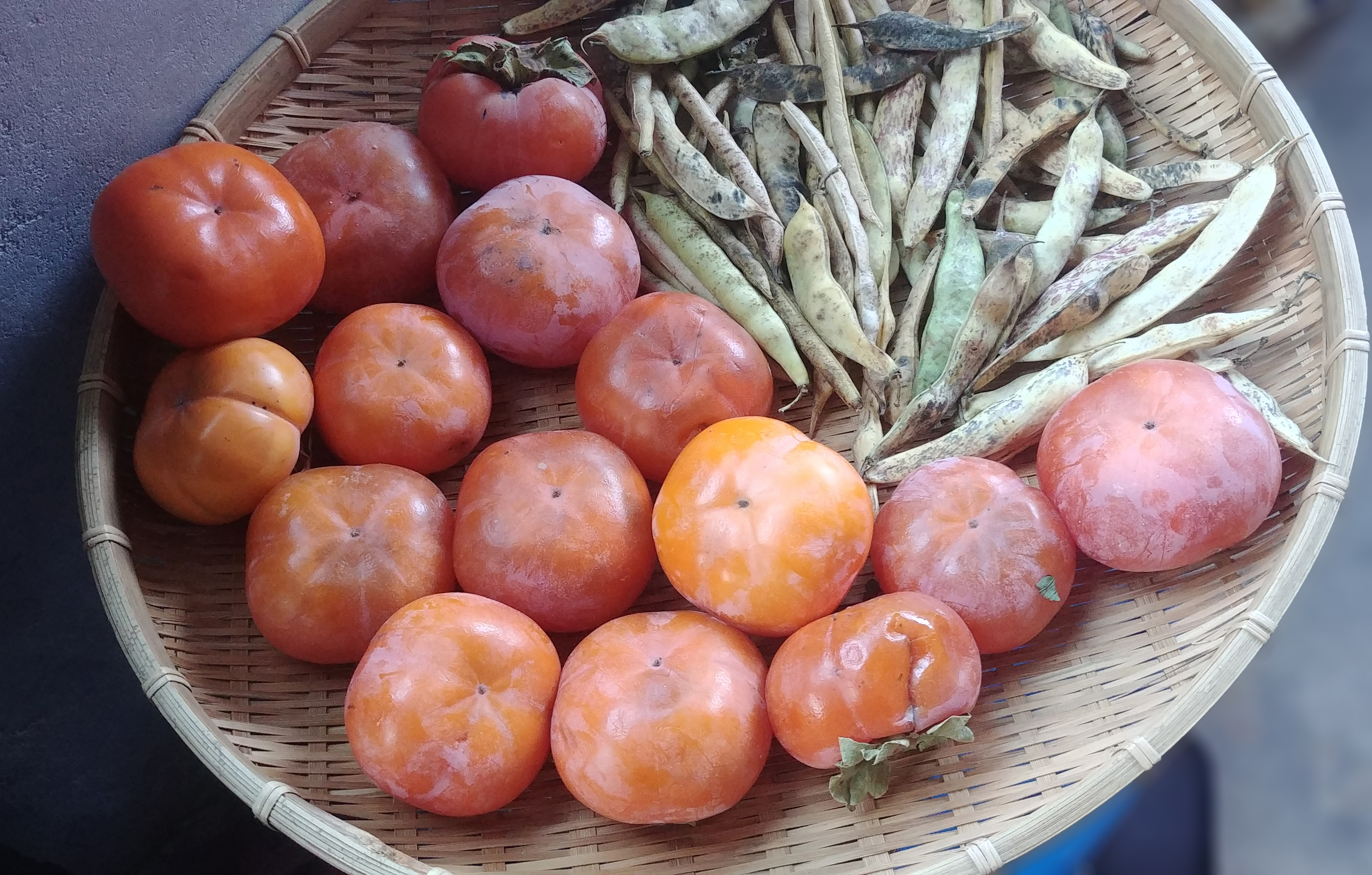
Persimmons and soybeans on sokuri

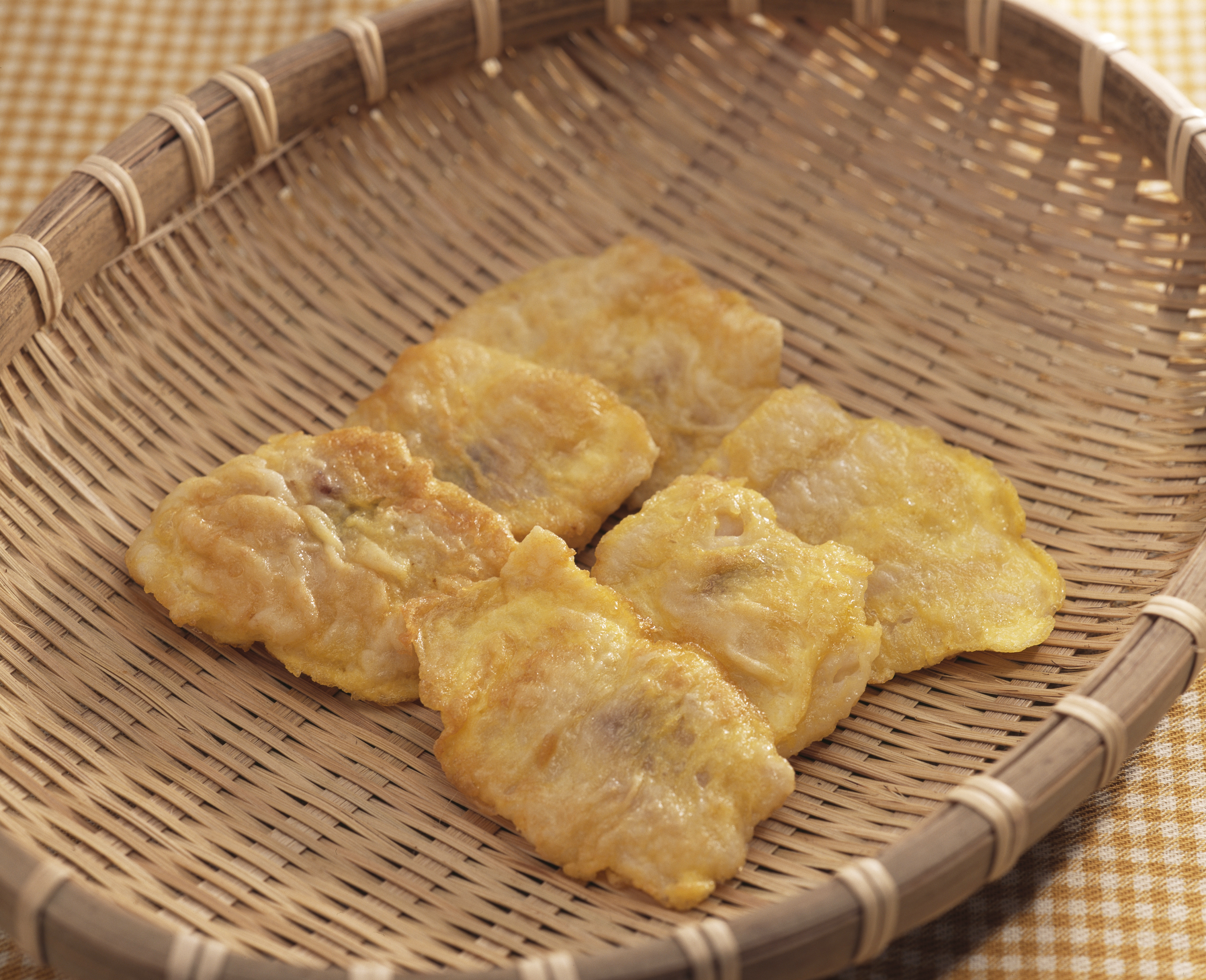
Dongtae-jeon on sokuri

== See also ==
- Bamboo weaving
- Wanchojang
- Zaru
