= Izuka =

Izuka may refer to:

- Kenta Izuka (born 1986), Japanese actor
- Izuka Hoyle (born 1996), Scottish actress

== See also ==
- Iizuka (surname)
