= Olya, Iran =

Olya (Persian: عليا) in Iran may refer to:

- Olya, Fars
- Olya, Tehran
- Olya Rural District, in Isfahan Province

== See also ==
- Olya, meaning "Upper", is a common element in Iranian place names; see
