= Iizuka (surname) =

Iizuka (written: 飯塚) is a Japanese surname. Notable people with the surname include:

- Hiroki Iizuka (shogi) (飯塚 祐紀; born 1969), Japanese shogi player
- Kozo Iizuka (飯塚 幸三; 1931–2024), Japanese scientific researcher and engineer
- Kunisaburo Iizuka (1875–1958), Japanese judoka
- Mayumi Iizuka (飯塚 雅弓; born 1977), Japanese voice actress and singer
- Naomi Iizuka (born 1965), American playwright
- Shōkansai Iizuka (1919–2004), Japanese artist
- Shōta Iizuka (飯塚 翔太; born 1991), Japanese sprinter
- Shōzō Iizuka (飯塚 昭三; 1933–2023), Japanese voice actor
- Takayuki Iizuka (飯塚 孝之; born 1966), Japanese professional wrestler
- Takashi Iizuka (game designer) (飯塚 隆; born 1970), Japanese video game designer
- Yuji Iizuka (飯塚 祐司; born 1974), Japanese ice hockey player and coach
