= Taiwanese bamboo weaving =

Bamboo weaving is a form of bambooworking and a traditional craft of Taiwan.

== History ==
Bamboo forest near Shizhuo, Chiayi County

Taiwan is situated between the temperate zone and the subtropical zone. Such a climate propels the growth of both individual disperse temperate bamboo and connected subtropical bamboo jungles. As a result, the native Taiwanese have a close relationship with the bamboos here: bamboo shoots, which are what they eat, come out of bamboos; so does the bamboo hat, bamboo shoes, bamboo chair, bamboo house, etc., all of which are closely connected with their livelihood; as for the tools used in daily labor, most of them are bamboo products, such as fishing gears, farm tools, hunting instrument, and so on. During the period when Taiwan was invaded, the bamboo culture in Taiwan was deepened by the Japanese bamboo culture. So a unique and profound bamboo culture was formed in Taiwan, and the knitting skills were improved to a certain extent. Therefore, Taiwan has become famous for its bamboo weaving crafts all over the world out of its wholesome tradition and profound local features.

About a century ago, the bambooworking was only limited to the making of living materials and productive tools such as hats, buckets, food steamers, dustpans, tables and chairs, beds, ridges and so on; when Taiwan was invaded by the Japanese at the end of the 19th century, the bamboo weaving skills were widely extended from the living and production use to the field of stationery, decoration, and even arts. In the meanwhile, the rough weaving skills were refined to be more delicate. The stationery case and lamp cover, which was woven by the Japanese artist at the Guangxu Times in Qing dynasty in China, was first discovered by Wang Zhenduo. Both these two bamboo products are beautiful in color, discreet in skills, and fashionable in pattern, which makes it too attractive to be released from one’s hands. The stationery case is 30 centimeters in length, 18 centimeters in width, and 8 centimeters in height. Woven by a number of bamboo strips of 0.5 cm in width, the stationery case has such average gaps between every two strips that it seems as if it were produced by the assembly line in the factory rather than made by human hands. Besides, the purplish red bamboo strips, where letter paper and thread-bound books were placed, appear quite simple and historically meaningful. As for the lamp cover, it is 23 centimeters in length, and 5 centimeters in width. Seeing the brown bamboo filament on the lamp and the paper-cut window decoration, one must be reminiscent of a simply-dressed and elegant host of the room.

== Application ==
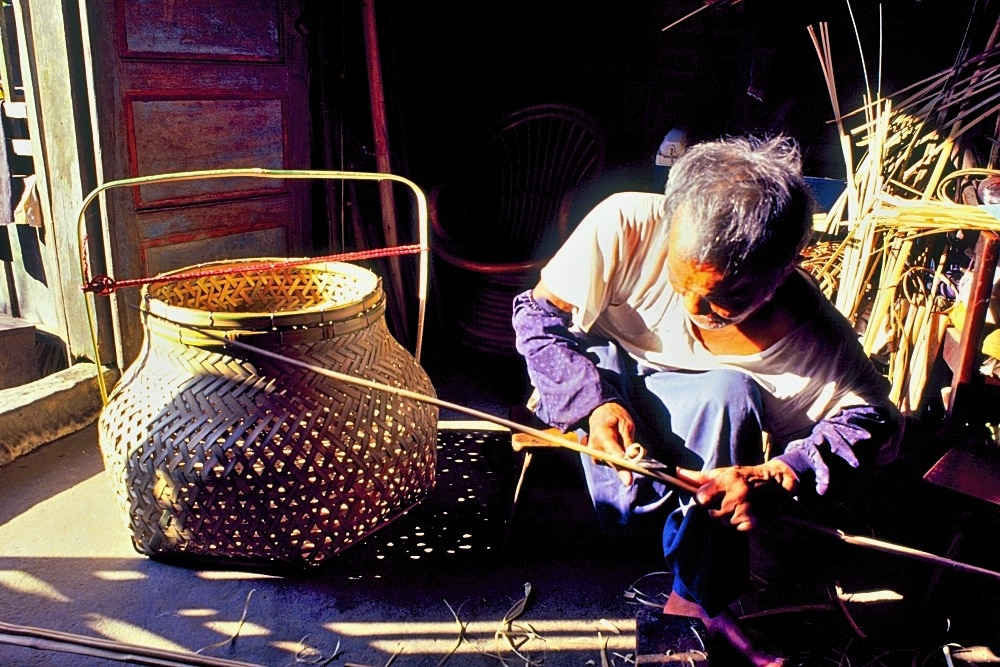
Bamboo weaving in Taiwan

The flower-like baskets in Taiwan is the most locally characteristic. Some are in the shape of jar with two ear-like handles; some are in the shape of bamboo barrel; some are in the shape of pack basket; others are in the shape of glass, bottle, pot, pan, bucket and so on. As for the weaving skill, it is divided into plain weave, vertical weave, slant weaves, and revolving weaves. The frame starting is divided into two types: inner starting and outer starting. There are both regulatory pattern design and casual design varying from the artist’s personal preference. The pack basket ones must be mentioned here, because they are so uniquely characteristic in shape design. The artist tends to base on the common pack basket and start weaving from the outer side. Therefore, the whole basket is sturdy in structure and rich in poetic meaning out of its special shape; the artists also make some innovation on the decorative patterns of the jar-like basket with two ear-like handles: they make the most of the materials and decorate the basket with slim bamboo branches, which make the basket more elegant and classic. Then the most delicate must be the two bamboo gadgets, one being the earthworm cage and the other being grasshopper cage. In the past, we used to see the fishermen were caught to be fishing in the drawings from Ming Dynasty and Qing Dynasty in China. In the pictures, one would usually find a little bamboo cage around the fisherman’s waist. Though frequently thought to be the fish cage, it is actually carried to put the earthworms in; the earthworm cage has contracture strips and is equipped with wood plug; as a result, when the earthworm moves inside the cage, it cannot escape through the little holes though it can breathe freely. As for the grasshopper cage, it is designed to be gourd-shaped, which can be placed upon the breaking branches of ancient trees. It is suitable for the grasshoppers in summer and crickets in autumn.

== See also ==
- Chinese bamboo weaving
- Japanese bamboo weaving
- Wanchojang in Korea
