= Chinese bamboo weaving =

Craft technique from China

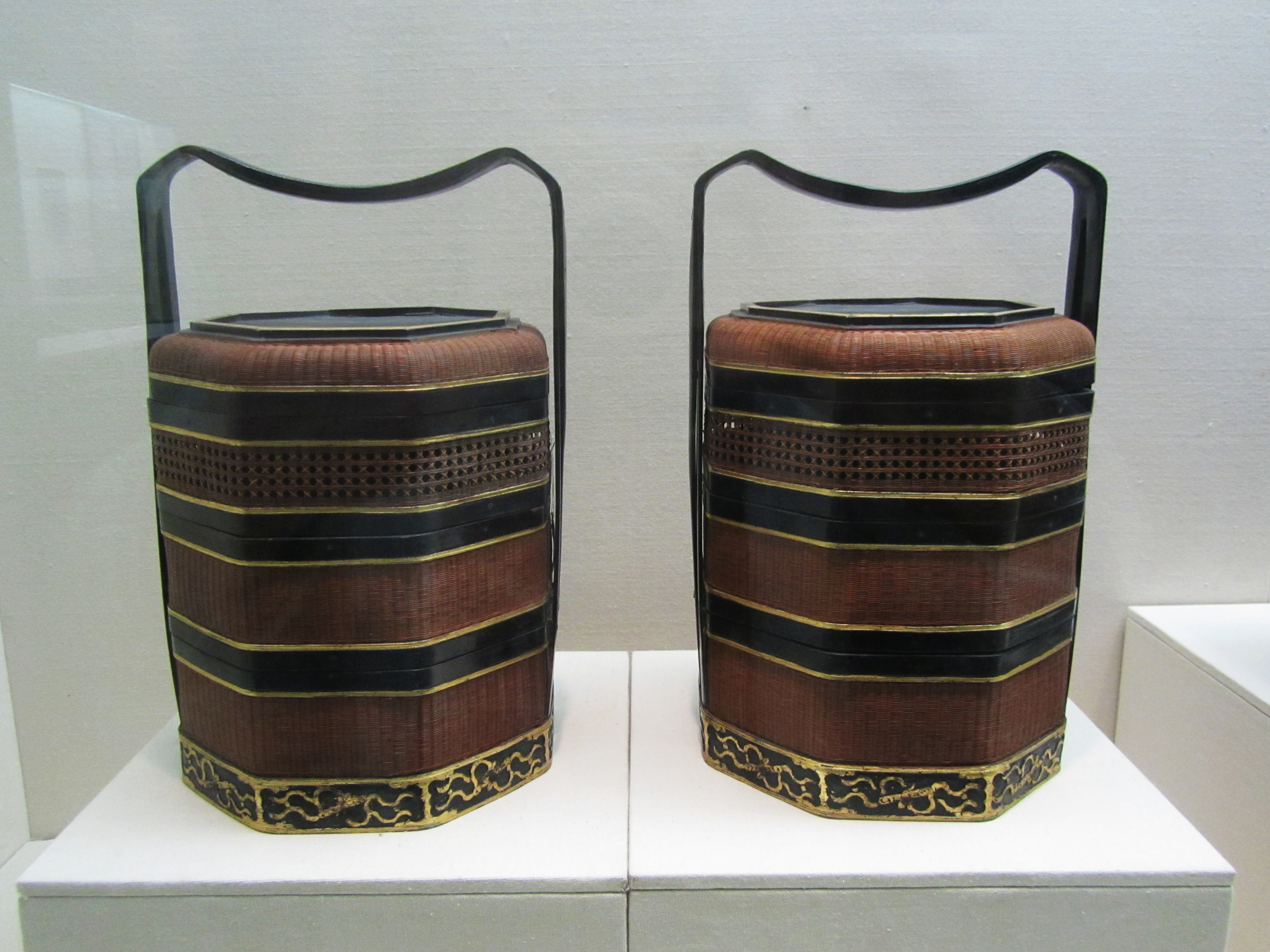
Shaoxing octagonal three grid bamboo baskets from Shengzhou (1950's)

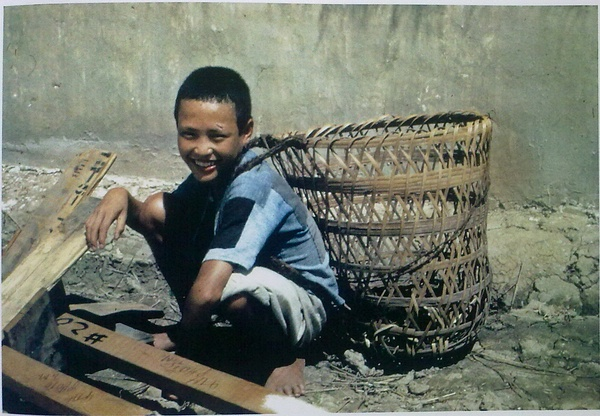
Chinese boy carrying a bamboo basket (before 1945)

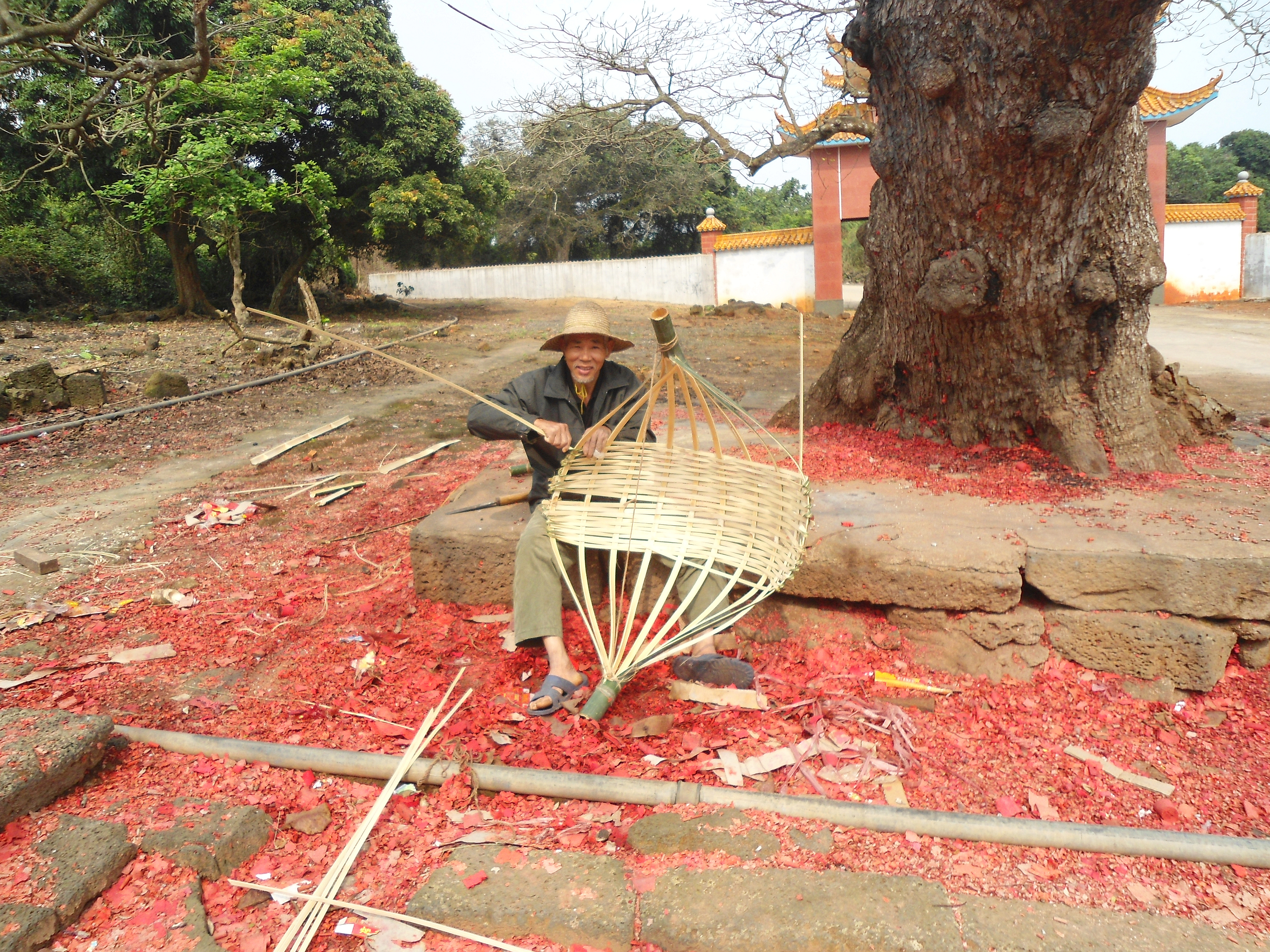
Bamboo basket maker in Hainan

Bamboo weaving is a form of bambooworking and a craft of China. It involves manipulating bamboo into various traditional knit and woven patterns to create both useful and decorative objects.

== History ==
Woven bamboo goods with an age of up to 7000 years unearthed at the Hemudu cultural ruins show that bamboo weaving has been a part of Chinese cultural history since very early periods of development. By the Warring States period, technique had substantially improved and examples of many types of bamboo wares have been found, such as boxes and bowls. During the Qin and Han dynasties these techniques were applied to create new types of bamboo wares such as mats and curtains. A notable example from this period would be bamboo weaving patterns represented in bronze from a chariot found in the mausoleum of Qin Shi Huang.

By the Tang and Song dynasties, bamboo weaving had expanded beyond practical objects and into creation of toys. During the middle Ming dynasty, bamboo weaving was mostly used for boxes and storage containers.

After the founding of the People's Republic of China, efforts have been made by the government to encourage and preserve the cultural history and skill of bamboo weaving, awarding titles to particularly accomplished masters of the craft, as well as designating some regions as recognized for their long history of practicing the art.

Anji County is particularly important to the production of bamboo crafts due to both the great variety and quantity of bamboo grown, and a high concentration of history and expertise in bamboo crafts.

== Applications ==
Bamboo weaving in contemporary China is mainly used for household objects, such as furniture, tea sets, curtains, and lanterns.

== See also ==
- Japanese bamboo weaving
- Taiwanese bamboo weaving
- Wanchojang in Korea
