= Olya-e Khaledabad =

Olya-e Khaledabad علياخالداباد
- Village
- Location within Iran
- Coordinates: 29°59′49″N 52°49′09″E
- Country: Iran
- Province: Fars
- County: Marvdasht
- Bakhsh: Central
- Rural District: Rudbal

Population (2006)
  - Total: 812
- Time zone: UTC+3:30 (IRST)
  - Summer (DST): UTC+4:30 (IRDT)

Olya-e Khaledabad (Persian: علياخالداباد, also Romanized as 'Olyā-e Khāledābād; also known as 'Olyā) is a village in Rudbal Rural District, in the Central District of Marvdasht County, Fars province, Iran. At the 2006 census, its population was 812, in 202 families.
