= Tanabe Chikuunsai IV =

Japanese artist

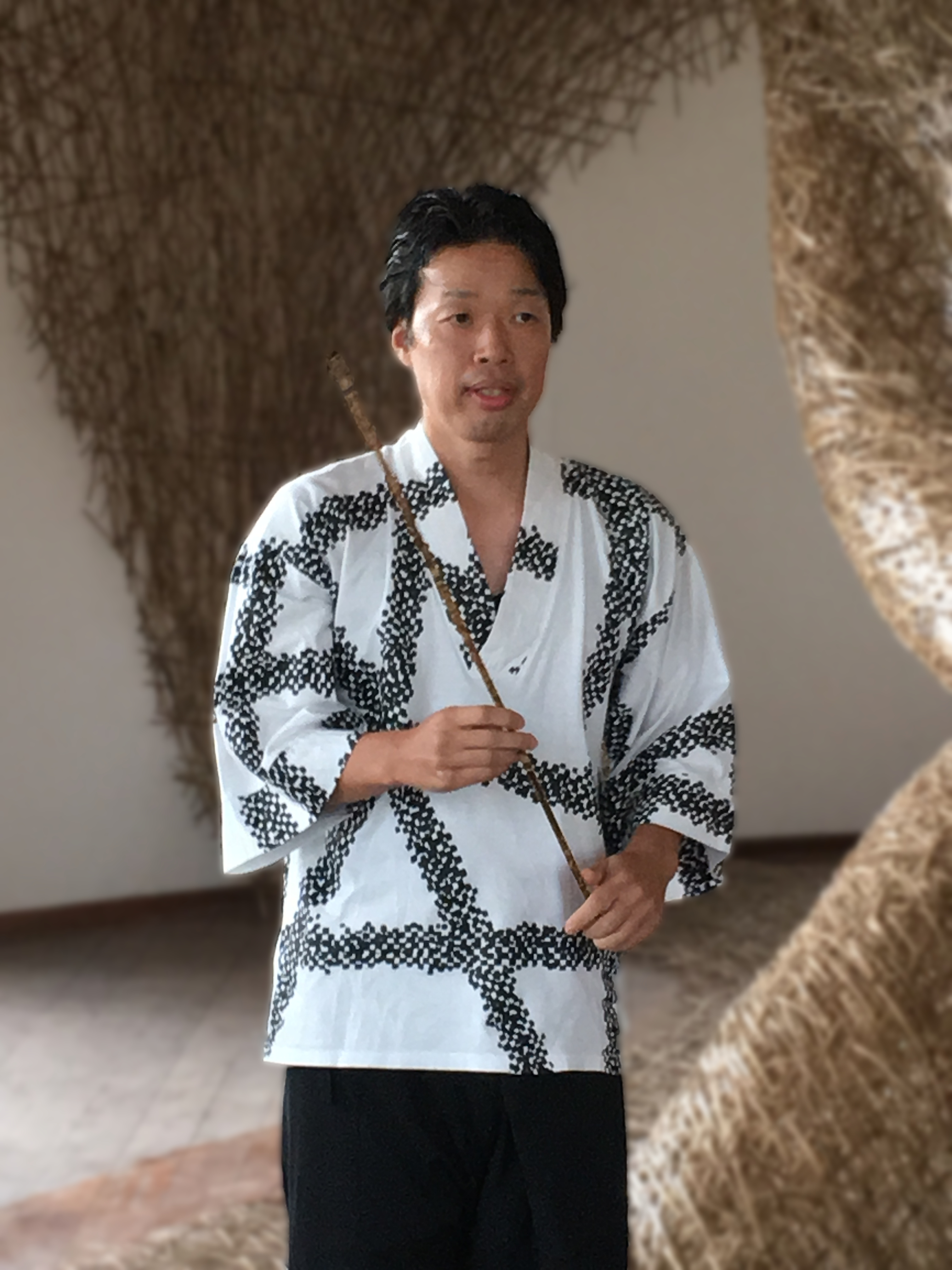
- Tanabe Shouchiku Chikuunsai IV in 2016
- Born: Tanabe Shouchiku Chikuunsai IV; 1973 (age 52–53); Kansai, Japan
- Known for: bamboo sculptures, installations and functional objects
- Father: Tanabe Chikuunsai III

Tanabe Chikuunsai IV (born 1973) is a Japanese bamboo artist. His sculptural works and functional objects are hand made from tiger bamboo (torachiku). He is a fourth generation bamboo master. His family name, Chikuunsai means "master of the bamboo clouds".

== Early life and education ==
Chikuunsai IV was born in the Sakai area of Osaka, Japan. He was educated in sculpture at the Tokyo University of the Arts. He then went to Beppu, to study traditional Japanese basket weaving with his father, the bamboo master, Tanabe Chikuunsai III.

== Work ==
Chikuunsai IV is a fourth generation bamboo artist who has shown his objects and installations internationally. Chikuunsai IV often works on large scale bamboo installations in twisting woven forms. The art critic Roberta Smith described his work as forms that “have an animated-cartoon energy and snap; they cavort almost wickedly.”

=== Exhibitions ===
Chikuunsai IV's work has been the subject of one-person shows at the Asian Art Museum, Tai Modern, Santa Fe, Japan House Los Angeles, and other venues.

In 2022, Chikuunsai IV was invited to create a site-specific installation, Yügo (Fusion), in Casa Lowe, in Barcelona, Spain. The installation was created from 6,000 individual pieces of tiger bamboo and meandered through several rooms of the interior space. The installation used no fasteners nor glue; instead it relied on the principle of tensegrity, tension-and-compression, to support the large installation.

=== Collections ===
His work can be found in the collection of the Metropolitan Museum of Art, and the Museum of the Minneapolis Institute of Art, the Seattle Museum of Art, the Asian Art Museum of San Francisco, among others.

== Personal life ==
Chikuunsai IV comes from a line of several generations of bamboo masters, starting with his great grandfather Chikuunsai (1877–1937). His grandfather was Chikuunsai II (1910–2000), and his father Chikuunsai III.
