= Iizuka Shōkansai =

Japanese artist (1919–2004)

Iizuka Shōkansai (飯塚 小玕斎; 1919–2004) was a Japanese artist specialising in Japanese bamboo weaving.

== Biography ==
Shōkansai's father was the bamboo artist Iizuka Rōkansai. Originally Shōkansai's older brother Iizuka Mikio was intended to inherit the family art, and Shōkansai instead studied oil painting at the Tokyo University of Art, under Fujishima Takeji. However, Mikio's death in 1942 left Rōkansai without an heir to continue the family tradition of bamboo art, and so Shōkansai began studying under his father. His father was a strict teacher; Shōkansai's first decade of instruction was devoted to the proper cutting of bamboo, which he now considers an indispensable part of the craft.

By the late 1940s Shōkansai was regularly submitting pieces to the Nitten exhibition held by the Japan Art Academy, and won a number of prizes in competition (including the Grand Prize (1954) and the Chrysanthemum Award (1960)); his work was present in over 20 incarnations of the exhibition. He was eventually made a full member of the Nitten group in 1967. By this time, he had already founded his own art group, the Nihon Chikujinkai, with a group of other artists. In the mid-1970s, he started contributing to the Traditional Crafts Exhibition (Nihon Dentō Kōgei Ten), expanding his repertoire to cover vases, boxes and other containers; he won the Minister of Education Award at his first showing and two years later was invited to be a judge of the competition. His work was exhibited in the Tokyo National Museum of Modern Art and the San Francisco Asian Art Museum, and he was invited to Taiwan and other countries to teach his basket-weaving technique. Between 1979 and 1981, he was employed by the Office of the Imperial Household to catalogue and research bamboo artefacts held in the Shōsōin Imperial Teasure House.

In 1982 he was recognised as a Living National Treasure by the Japan Craft Arts Association and the Agency for Cultural Affairs.
