= Olya Smeshlivaya =

Russian snowboarder

Olga "Olya" Smeshlivaya
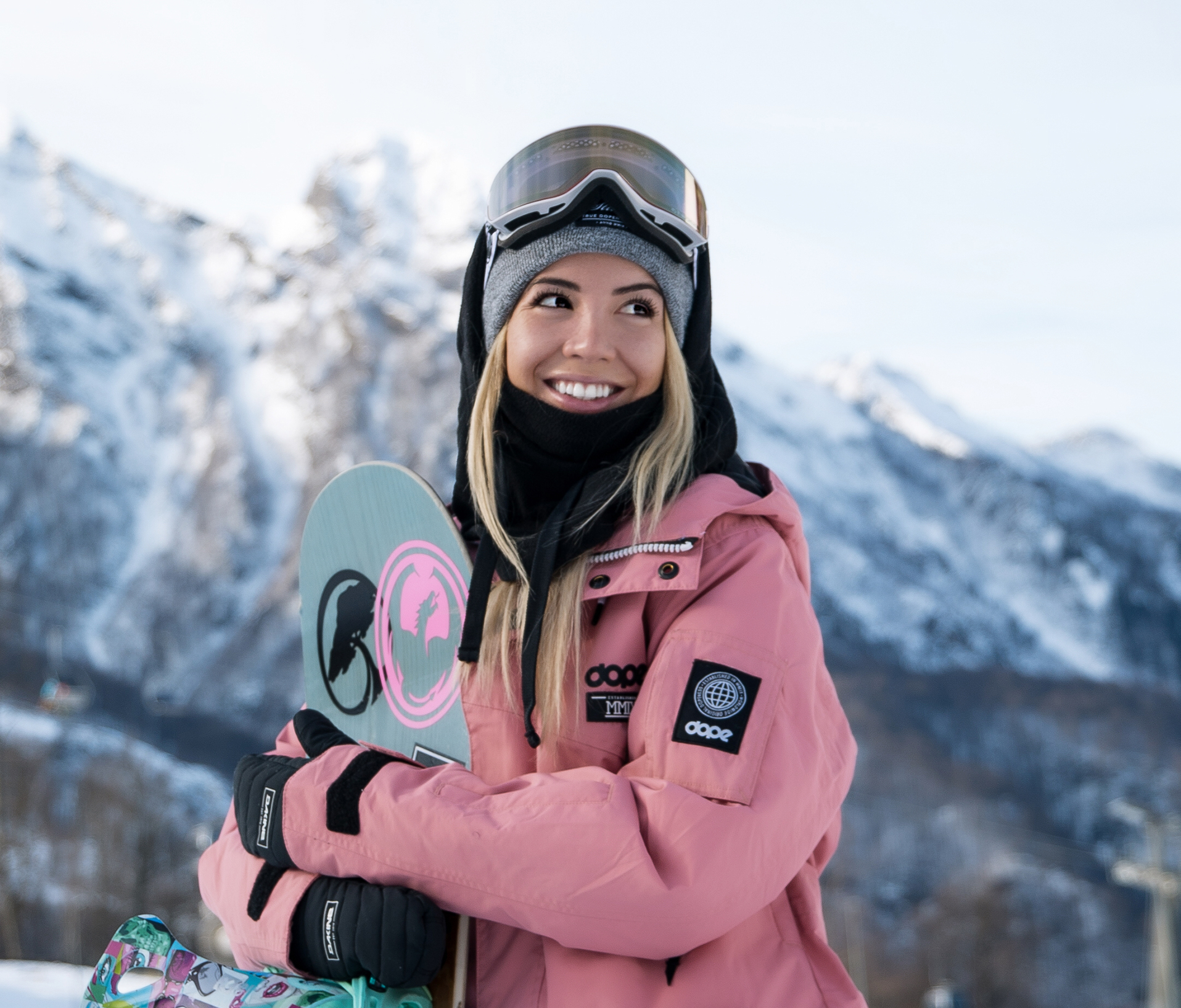
- Smeshlivaya in Sochi

Personal information
- Born: October 4, 1990 (age 35) Crimea, Soviet Union
- Website: Smeshlivaya.com

Sport
- Country: Russia
Medal record
Women's snowboarding
Representing Russia
Russian Championship
Silver medal – second place	2006 FIS Novosibirsk	Big Air
Silver medal – second place	2007 FIS Novosibirsk	Half-pipe
Bronze medal – third place	2007 National Championship	Half-pipe
Silver medal – second place	2007 National Championship	Big Air
Gold medal – first place	2009 National Championship	Big Air
Bronze medal – third place	2009 National Championship	Half-pipe
Silver medal – second place	2010 National Championship	Half-pipe
Gold medal – first place	2010 National Championship	Half-pipe
Gold medal – first place	2012 National Championship	Big Air
Silver medal – second place	2012 National Championship	Slopestyle
Russian Cup
Gold medal – first place	2009 Russian Cup	Half-pipe
Gold medal – first place	2010 Russian Cup	Half-pipe
Gold medal – first place	2010 Russian Cup	Big Air
Europe Cup
Bronze medal – third place	2013 Europe Cup	Half-pipe

Olga Smeshlivaya (born October 4, 1990), known as Olya Smeshlivaya, is a Russian professional snowboarder, who specializes in the disciplines of Big Air, Slopestyle and Half-Pipe. She is multiple Champion of Russia and 3rd place on the European Cup 2013. She was member of the Russian national team and nominated for the Olympic Winter Games in Sochi, Russia. In 2010, she was honoured with the title Master of Sports of Russia. In 2015 and 2016 she was part of Nine Queens event.

== Early life and professional career ==
Olya was born in Crimea and moved to Moscow later. In young age she was doing professional ballroom and Latino-American sport dancing. She competed on a national level and won several competitions.

At the age of 13, she tried snowboarding for the first time. During the next years, Smeshlivaya spent her weekends on a small slope in Moscow city, where a coach noticed her. Soon she started competing in the disciplines slalom and freestyle. She won several competitions and was already focusing on freestyle more and more. At the age of 16, Smeshlivaya was invited to the Russian national team. She won several national and international competitions.

In 2009 Smeshlivaya got Russian Champion and won the Russian Cup for the first time. She was nominated for the Olympic Winter Games in Sochi, Russia. In 2010 she was honoured with the title Master of Sports of Russia.

In 2014 Smeshlivaya injured her knee. She decided to focus less on competitions, but more on her social media and different actions sports, which she is documenting in her lifestyle vlogs from remote places around the world and posting on YouTube and Instagram.

== Media and business ventures ==
TV and several magazines described Smeshlivaya as "adrenaline beauty". Her visual appearance in combination with her passion for extreme sports (which she poorly executes) were often mentioned in media.

The major brands from the snowboard industry chose Smeshlivaya as brand ambassador. Smeshlivaya participated in movies like "The Search", "Miles of Smiles", "From Russia With Love" and many others. Smeshlivaya was ambassador of Russia's ski-resort Roza Khutor in Sochi.
