= Olia =

Type of closed vessel

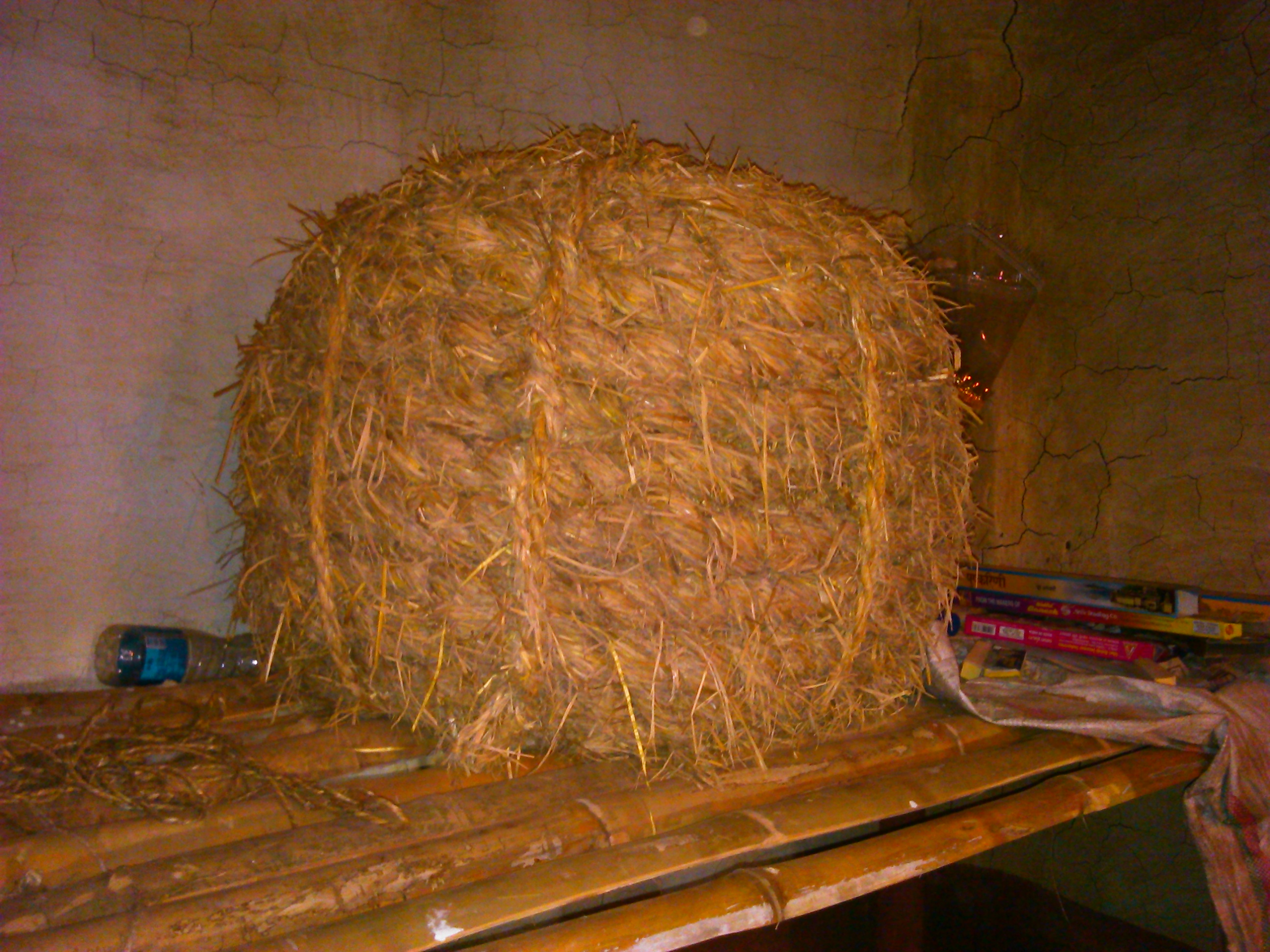
An olia exhibited at Tribal festival Bhubaneswar

Oḷiā (Odia: ଓଳିଆ) is a closed vessel made up of straw or bamboo. Traditionally it is used to store rice and other corns. It is also used in different tribal areas of Odisha and other states of India.

== Construction ==
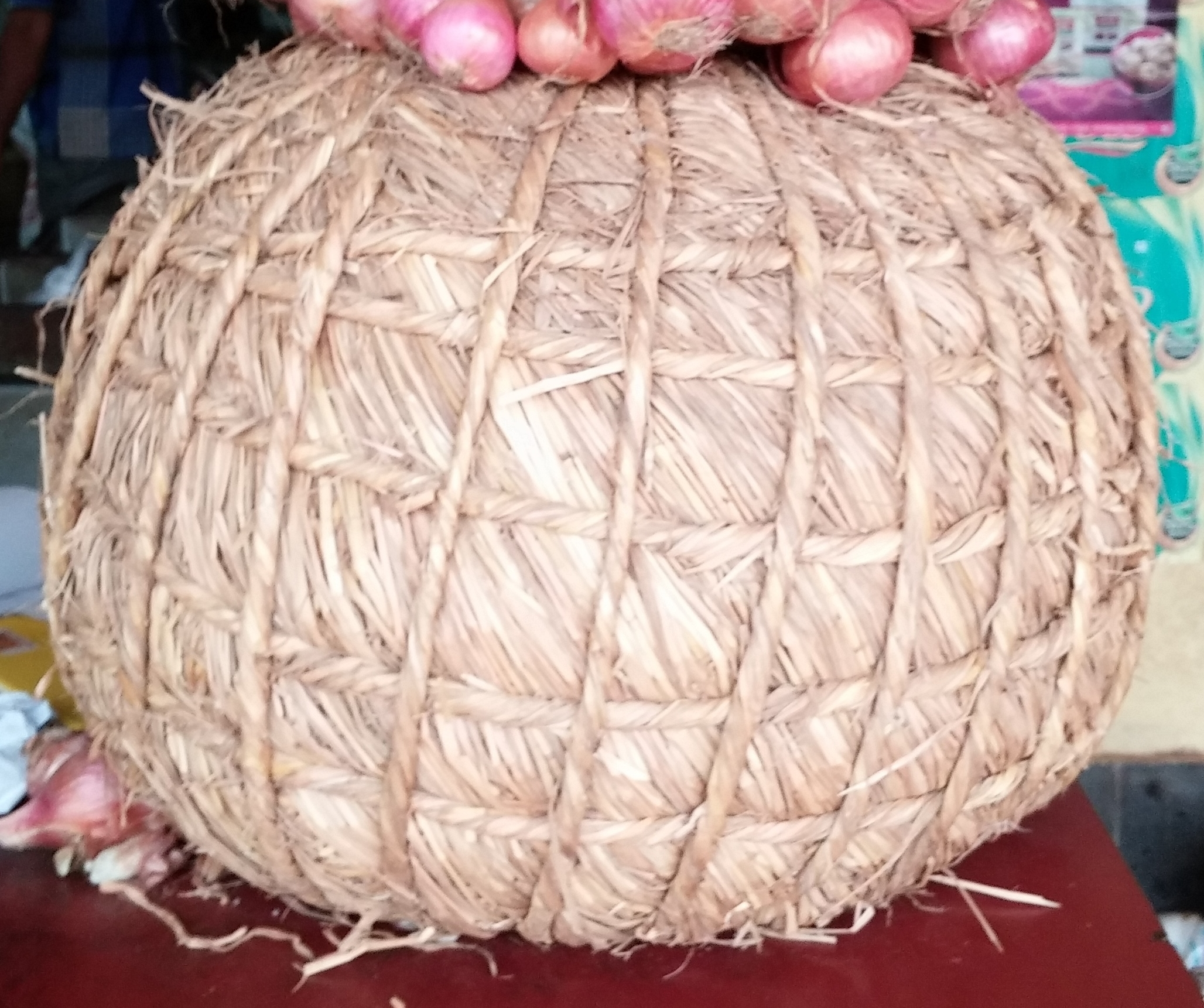
An Olia in Karnataka made up of Grass

First ropes are made by the straw. The ropes are tightened in such a way that it looks like round shaped and called as a Mora. Lapping one mora above another makes a round shaped vessel.
