= Wanchojang =

Traditional Korean weaving technique

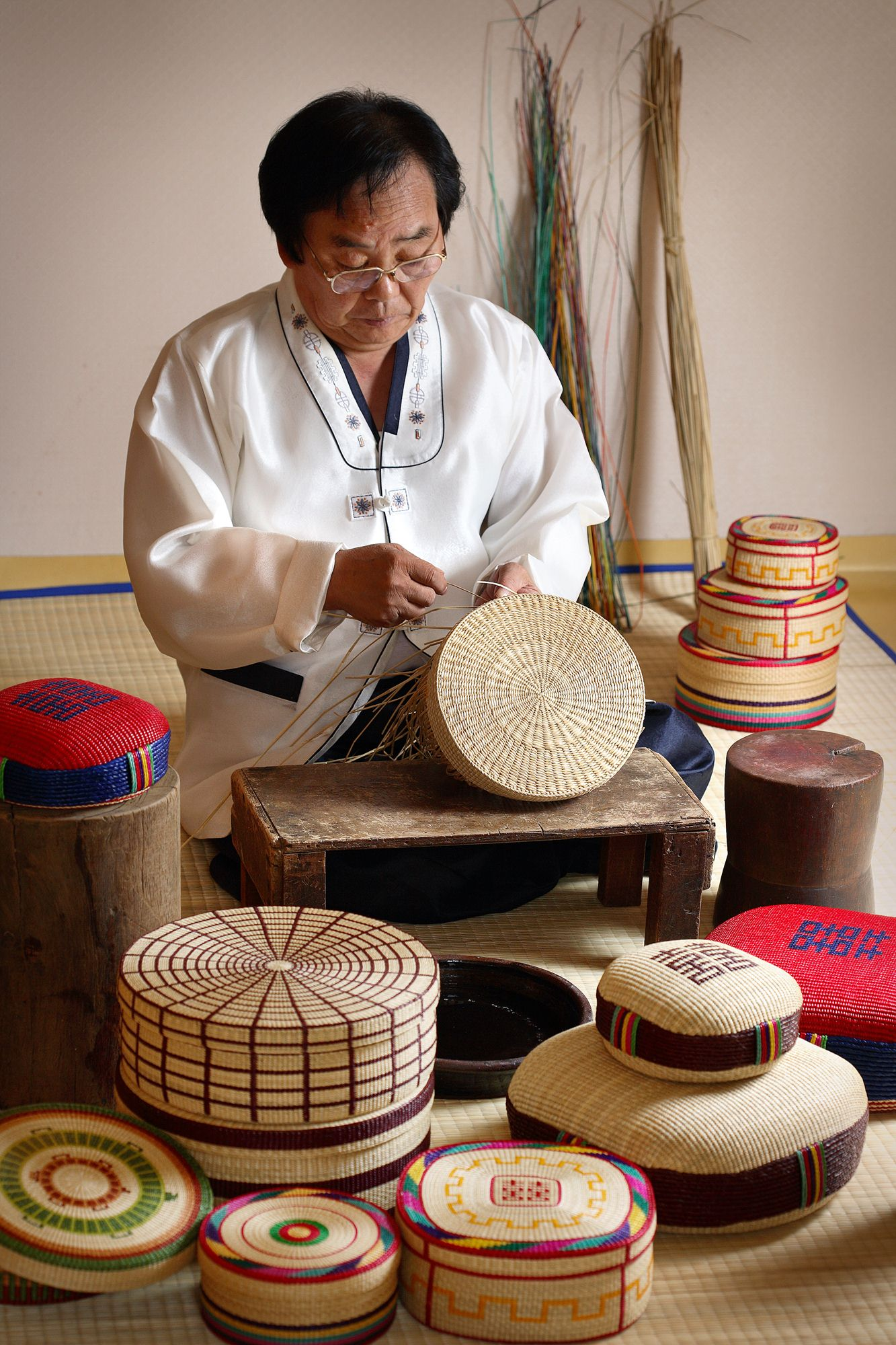
A man engaging in wanchojang (2007)

Wanchojang (Korean: 완초장) is the traditional Korean art of creating mats, baskets and boxes from woven sedge (wancho), and is also the name given to master craftsmen of the art.

== History ==
Sedge has been a common material for household goods in Korea since the Silla period (57 BCE – 935 CE). Despite the availability of the plant, which grows well in the waterlogged soil of rice paddies, sedge products were highly prized and were used as decoration in royal palaces and given as tribute to other nations. A sedge basket known as a pyebaek dongguri was an important element of the traditional wedding rite, and royal sacrificial ceremonies in the Goryeo period employed sedge weaving as a religious sacrament.

== Construction ==
The process of creating sedge products starts with the farming of the raw material. Sedge is planted in April and harvested only a few months later in the summer. The cut stalks are boiled, dried, soaked, and then dried again in a process that, after several repetitions, bleaches them to a shiny white colour. Some strands are dyed to enable coloured highlights and designs in the finished work.

Two principal methods for weaving the sedge exist: one involving the use of tools or machines, the other performed entirely by hand. These are sometimes referred to as "close" and "sparse" weaving. Machine weaving is predominantly used for making mats, whilst boxes, bowls and baskets require hand weaving. A basic frame (no) is created first, comprising interwoven sedge strands; the samori, or vertical sections, are then woven into this. At this stage, images, patterns and characters are incorporated into the design, in a process called tteumjil. The process of creation is lengthy, taking up to two weeks for the construction of a hand-made sajuham ("three-tiered box").

== Yi Sang-jae ==
The current master of wanchojang is Yi Sang-jae from Ganghwado, an area that has long been a site of sedge cultivation and weaving. Born in 1943, he has been working in sedge for over 50 years, and has had his works exhibited in Japan and the UK. Yi, along with the art of wanchojang itself, was designated in 1996 as an Important Intangible Cultural Asset.

== See also ==
- Bamboo weaving
