= Double Wing Attack, Retreating Rook =

Shogi opening

In shogi, Retreating Rook (引き飛車 hikihisha) is a variant of the Double Wing Attack (相掛かり aigakari) opening and joseki in which Black's rook retreats all the way back to their camp after a pawn exchange in the eighth file allowing White to also exchange rook pawns.

== Development ==
Retreating Rook
position after 11 moves
☖ pieces in hand: –

| 9 | 8 | 7 | 6 | 5 | 4 | 3 | 2 | 1 |
| 香 | 桂 | 銀 | 金 | 王 | | 銀 | 桂 | 香 | 1 |
| | 飛 | | | | | 金 | 角 | | 2 |
| 歩 | | 歩 | 歩 | 歩 | 歩 | 歩 | 歩 | 歩 | 3 |
| | | | | | | | | | 4 |
| | 歩 | | | | | | | | 5 |
| | | | | | | | | | 6 |
| 歩 | 歩 | 歩 | 歩 | 歩 | 歩 | 歩 | | 歩 | 7 |
| | 角 | 金 | | | | | 飛 | | 8 |
| 香 | 桂 | 銀 | | 玉 | 金 | 銀 | 桂 | 香 | 9 |

☗ pieces in hand: 歩

| 6. | R-28 |

The Retreating Rook option occurs after Black and White exchange pawns on the second file.

6. R-28. Black's rook retreats back to their camp on rank 8. (Note: Another common alternative is for Black to position their rook down to the rank 6. See: Double Wing Attack Floating Rook.) (See: Double Wing Attack.)

Following this, White has the option immediately trading their rook pawn on the eighth file in order to get a pawn in hand.

Alternately, White may attempt to delay trading the rook pawn and instead develop other pieces first.

=== White's pawn trade ===
Retreating Rook
position after 12 moves
☖ pieces in hand: –

| 9 | 8 | 7 | 6 | 5 | 4 | 3 | 2 | 1 |
| 香 | 桂 | 銀 | 金 | 王 | | 銀 | 桂 | 香 | 1 |
| | 飛 | | | | | 金 | 角 | | 2 |
| 歩 | | 歩 | 歩 | 歩 | 歩 | 歩 | 歩 | 歩 | 3 |
| | | | | | | | | | 4 |
| | | | | | | | | | 5 |
| | 歩 | | | | | | | | 6 |
| 歩 | 歩 | 歩 | 歩 | 歩 | 歩 | 歩 | | 歩 | 7 |
| | 角 | 金 | | | | | 飛 | | 8 |
| 香 | 桂 | 銀 | | 玉 | 金 | 銀 | 桂 | 香 | 9 |

☗ pieces in hand: 歩

| 6. | ... | P-86 |

Retreating Rook
position after 14 moves
☖ pieces in hand: 歩

| 9 | 8 | 7 | 6 | 5 | 4 | 3 | 2 | 1 |
| 香 | 桂 | 銀 | 金 | 王 | | 銀 | 桂 | 香 | 1 |
| | | | | | | 金 | 角 | | 2 |
| 歩 | | 歩 | 歩 | 歩 | 歩 | 歩 | 歩 | 歩 | 3 |
| | | | | | | | | | 4 |
| | | | | | | | | | 5 |
| | 飛 | | | | | | | | 6 |
| 歩 | | 歩 | 歩 | 歩 | 歩 | 歩 | | 歩 | 7 |
| | 角 | 金 | | | | | 飛 | | 8 |
| 香 | 桂 | 銀 | | 玉 | 金 | 銀 | 桂 | 香 | 9 |

☗ pieces in hand: 歩歩

| 7. | Px86 | Rx86 |

6. ...P-86, 7. Px86 Rx86. After Black's rook has retreated, White now has the option of exchanging their rook pawn in order to get a pawn in hand and clear their eighth file in order to activate their rook. This is played with a similar sequences of moves used for Black's earlier second file pawn exchange.

Retreating Rook
position after 15 moves
☖ pieces in hand: 歩

| 9 | 8 | 7 | 6 | 5 | 4 | 3 | 2 | 1 |
| 香 | 桂 | 銀 | 金 | 王 | | 銀 | 桂 | 香 | 1 |
| | | | | | | 金 | 角 | | 2 |
| 歩 | | 歩 | 歩 | 歩 | 歩 | 歩 | 歩 | 歩 | 3 |
| | | | | | | | | | 4 |
| | | | | | | | | | 5 |
| | 飛 | | | | | | | | 6 |
| 歩 | 歩 | 歩 | 歩 | 歩 | 歩 | 歩 | | 歩 | 7 |
| | 角 | 金 | | | | | 飛 | | 8 |
| 香 | 桂 | 銀 | | 玉 | 金 | 銀 | 桂 | 香 | 9 |

☗ pieces in hand: 歩

| 8. | P*87 |

8. P*87. A pawn drop by Black.

After the pawn exchange and Black's pawn drop on move 15, White also has the option of either floating their rook just above their line of pawns to the rank 4 (§ White's Floating Rook) or retreating their rook awhile back to the rook's start position on rank 2 (§ White's Retreating Rook). White's Floating Rook is the more common variant.

==== White's Floating Rook ====
White's Floating Rook
position after 16 moves
☖ pieces in hand: 歩

| 9 | 8 | 7 | 6 | 5 | 4 | 3 | 2 | 1 |
| 香 | 桂 | 銀 | 金 | 王 | | 銀 | 桂 | 香 | 1 |
| | | | | | | 金 | 角 | | 2 |
| 歩 | | 歩 | 歩 | 歩 | 歩 | 歩 | 歩 | 歩 | 3 |
| | 飛 | | | | | | | | 4 |
| | | | | | | | | | 5 |
| | | | | | | | | | 6 |
| 歩 | 歩 | 歩 | 歩 | 歩 | 歩 | 歩 | | 歩 | 7 |
| | 角 | 金 | | | | | 飛 | | 8 |
| 香 | 桂 | 銀 | | 玉 | 金 | 銀 | 桂 | 香 | 9 |

☗ pieces in hand: 歩

| 8. | ... | R-84 |

8. ...R-84. White floats their rook to rank 4. The Floating Rook position defends rank 4 from further encroachment by Black.

===== Climbing Silver =====
Climbing Silver
position after 17 moves
☖ pieces in hand: 歩

| 9 | 8 | 7 | 6 | 5 | 4 | 3 | 2 | 1 |
| 香 | 桂 | 銀 | 金 | 王 | | 銀 | 桂 | 香 | 1 |
| | | | | | | 金 | 角 | | 2 |
| 歩 | | 歩 | 歩 | 歩 | 歩 | 歩 | 歩 | 歩 | 3 |
| | 飛 | | | | | | | | 4 |
| | | | | | | | | | 5 |
| | | | | | | | | | 6 |
| 歩 | 歩 | 歩 | 歩 | 歩 | 歩 | 歩 | | 歩 | 7 |
| | 角 | 金 | | | | 銀 | 飛 | | 8 |
| 香 | 桂 | 銀 | | 玉 | 金 | | 桂 | 香 | 9 |

☗ pieces in hand: 歩
9. S-38

After White's Floating Rook (or also Retreating Rook), a common variant of Double Wing Attack Retreating Rook is for Black to play Climbing Silver.

9. S-38. Black moves their right silver up to advance up the second file. This can lead to the most direct way to play Climbing Silver which is called Primitive Climbing Silver.

9. ...P-34. White moves their third file pawn to open their bishop's diagonal.

===== Reclining Silver =====
Reclining Silver configuration
☖ pieces in hand: –

| 9 | 8 | 7 | 6 | 5 | 4 | 3 | 2 | 1 |
| | | | | | | | | | 1 |
| | | | | | | | | | 2 |
| | | | | | | | | | 3 |
| | | | | | | | | | 4 |
| | | | | | | | | | 5 |
| | | | | 銀 | 歩 | | | | 6 |
| | | | 歩 | 歩 | | | | | 7 |
| | | | | | | | | | 8 |
| | | | | | | | | | 9 |

☗ pieces in hand: –

Other variants of Double Wing Attack Retreating Rook include Reclining Silver.

The Reclining Silver has the right silver positioned on central file above the central pawn and to the right of the silver is the pawn that was advancing in order to let the silver move through the line of pawns. The silver is said to recline on the seat of pawns.

==== White's Retreating Rook ====
After pawn exchanges
(Black's move)
☖ pieces in hand: 歩

| 9 | 8 | 7 | 6 | 5 | 4 | 3 | 2 | 1 |
| 香 | 桂 | 銀 | 金 | 王 | 金 | 銀 | 桂 | 香 | 1 |
| | 飛 | | | | | 金 | 角 | | 2 |
| 歩 | | 歩 | 歩 | 歩 | 歩 | 歩 | 歩 | 歩 | 3 |
| | | | | | | | | | 4 |
| | | | | | | | | | 5 |
| | | | | | | | | | 6 |
| 歩 | 歩 | 歩 | 歩 | 歩 | 歩 | 歩 | | 歩 | 7 |
| | 角 | 金 | | | | | 飛 | | 8 |
| 香 | 桂 | 銀 | | 玉 | 金 | 銀 | 桂 | 香 | 9 |

☗ pieces in hand: 歩
8. ...R-82

The Retreating Rook option occurs after Black and White exchange pawns on the eighth file. This option results in a Double Retreating Rook variation of Double Wing Attack.

8. ...R-82. White's rook retreats back their camp on rank 2.

This option is less common than White playing a Floating Rook position. (See above.) It gives White less protection from an attack strategy by Black such as Climbing Silver. However, it does lead to the Stagecoach joseki. (See below.)

Before pawn exchanges
(Black's move)
☖ pieces in hand: –

| 9 | 8 | 7 | 6 | 5 | 4 | 3 | 2 | 1 |
| 香 | 桂 | 銀 | 金 | 王 | 金 | 銀 | 桂 | 香 | 1 |
| | 飛 | | | | | 金 | 角 | | 2 |
| 歩 | | 歩 | 歩 | 歩 | 歩 | 歩 | 歩 | 歩 | 3 |
| | | | | | | | | | 4 |
| | 歩 | | | | | | 歩 | | 5 |
| | | | | | | | | | 6 |
| 歩 | 歩 | 歩 | 歩 | 歩 | 歩 | 歩 | 歩 | 歩 | 7 |
| | 角 | 金 | | | | | 飛 | | 8 |
| 香 | 桂 | 銀 | | 玉 | 金 | 銀 | 桂 | 香 | 9 |

☗ pieces in hand: –
After pawn exchanges
(Black's move)
☖ pieces in hand: 歩

| 9 | 8 | 7 | 6 | 5 | 4 | 3 | 2 | 1 |
| 香 | 桂 | 銀 | 金 | 王 | 金 | 銀 | 桂 | 香 | 1 |
| | 飛 | | | | | 金 | 角 | | 2 |
| 歩 | | 歩 | 歩 | 歩 | 歩 | 歩 | 歩 | 歩 | 3 |
| | | | | | | | | | 4 |
| | | | | | | | | | 5 |
| | | | | | | | | | 6 |
| 歩 | 歩 | 歩 | 歩 | 歩 | 歩 | 歩 | | 歩 | 7 |
| | 角 | 金 | | | | | 飛 | | 8 |
| 香 | 桂 | 銀 | | 玉 | 金 | 銀 | 桂 | 香 | 9 |

☗ pieces in hand: 歩

Note that if White retreats their rook to 8b, then, compared to the Double Wing position before Black's pawn exchange, the following moves have effectively only removed each player's rook pawn and placed them in hand.

===== Stagecoach =====
Stagecoach
up move 36
☖ pieces in hand: 歩

| 9 | 8 | 7 | 6 | 5 | 4 | 3 | 2 | 1 |
| 香 | 桂 | | | | 王 | 銀 | 桂 | 香 | 1 |
| | 飛 | | | 金 | | 金 | 角 | | 2 |
| | | | | 歩 | 歩 | | 歩 | | 3 |
| 歩 | | 歩 | 歩 | 銀 | | 歩 | | 歩 | 4 |
| | | | | | | | | | 5 |
| 歩 | | 歩 | | 銀 | 歩 | 歩 | | 歩 | 6 |
| | 歩 | | 歩 | 歩 | | | | | 7 |
| | 角 | 金 | | 金 | | | 飛 | | 8 |
| 香 | 桂 | 銀 | 玉 | | | | 桂 | 香 | 9 |

☗ pieces in hand: 歩
Stagecoach
up move 42
☖ pieces in hand: 歩

| 9 | 8 | 7 | 6 | 5 | 4 | 3 | 2 | 1 |
| 香 | | | | | | 銀 | 桂 | 香 | 1 |
| | 飛 | | | 王 | | 金 | 角 | | 2 |
| | | 桂 | 金 | 歩 | 歩 | | 歩 | | 3 |
| 歩 | | 歩 | 歩 | 銀 | | 歩 | | 歩 | 4 |
| | | | | | | | | | 5 |
| 歩 | | 歩 | | 銀 | 歩 | 歩 | | 歩 | 6 |
| | 歩 | | 歩 | 歩 | 金 | 桂 | | | 7 |
| | 角 | 金 | | 玉 | | | 飛 | | 8 |
| 香 | 桂 | 銀 | | | | | | 香 | 9 |

☗ pieces in hand: 歩

Stagecoach
up move 44
☖ pieces in hand: 歩

| 9 | 8 | 7 | 6 | 5 | 4 | 3 | 2 | 1 |
| 香 | | | | | | 銀 | 桂 | 香 | 1 |
| | 飛 | | | 王 | | 金 | 角 | | 2 |
| | | 桂 | 金 | 歩 | 歩 | | 歩 | | 3 |
| 歩 | | 歩 | | 銀 | | 歩 | | 歩 | 4 |
| | | | 歩 | | 歩 | | | | 5 |
| 歩 | | 歩 | | 銀 | | 歩 | | 歩 | 6 |
| | 歩 | | 歩 | 歩 | 金 | 桂 | | | 7 |
| | 角 | 金 | | 玉 | | | 飛 | | 8 |
| 香 | 桂 | 銀 | | | | | | 香 | 9 |

☗ pieces in hand: 歩
Stagecoach
up move 45
☖ pieces in hand: 歩

| 9 | 8 | 7 | 6 | 5 | 4 | 3 | 2 | 1 |
| 香 | | | | | | 銀 | 桂 | 香 | 1 |
| | 飛 | | | 王 | | 金 | 角 | | 2 |
| | | 桂 | 金 | 歩 | 歩 | | 歩 | | 3 |
| 歩 | | 歩 | | 銀 | | 歩 | | 歩 | 4 |
| | | | 歩 | | 歩 | | | | 5 |
| 歩 | | 歩 | | 銀 | | 歩 | 飛 | 歩 | 6 |
| | 歩 | | 歩 | 歩 | 金 | 桂 | | | 7 |
| | 角 | 金 | | 玉 | | | | | 8 |
| 香 | 桂 | 銀 | | | | | | 香 | 9 |

☗ pieces in hand: 歩

Stagecoach
up move 46
☖ pieces in hand: 角 歩

| 9 | 8 | 7 | 6 | 5 | 4 | 3 | 2 | 1 |
| 香 | | | | | | 銀 | 桂 | 香 | 1 |
| | 飛 | | | 王 | | 金 | | | 2 |
| | | 桂 | 金 | 歩 | 歩 | | 歩 | | 3 |
| 歩 | | 歩 | | 銀 | | 歩 | | 歩 | 4 |
| | | | 歩 | | 歩 | | | | 5 |
| 歩 | | 歩 | | 銀 | | 歩 | 飛 | 歩 | 6 |
| | 歩 | | 歩 | 歩 | 金 | 桂 | | | 7 |
| | 馬 | 金 | | 玉 | | | | | 8 |
| 香 | 桂 | 銀 | | | | | | 香 | 9 |

☗ pieces in hand: 歩
Stagecoach
up move 48
☖ pieces in hand: 角 歩

| 9 | 8 | 7 | 6 | 5 | 4 | 3 | 2 | 1 |
| 香 | | | | | | | 桂 | 香 | 1 |
| | 飛 | | | 王 | | 金 | 銀 | | 2 |
| | | 桂 | 金 | 歩 | 歩 | | 歩 | | 3 |
| 歩 | | 歩 | | 銀 | | 歩 | | 歩 | 4 |
| | | | 歩 | | 歩 | | | | 5 |
| 歩 | | 歩 | | 銀 | | 歩 | 飛 | 歩 | 6 |
| | 歩 | | 歩 | 歩 | 金 | 桂 | | | 7 |
| | 銀 | 金 | | 玉 | | | | | 8 |
| 香 | 桂 | | | | | | | 香 | 9 |

☗ pieces in hand: 角 歩

Stagecoach
up move 50
☖ pieces in hand: 角 歩

| 9 | 8 | 7 | 6 | 5 | 4 | 3 | 2 | 1 |
| 香 | | | | | | | 桂 | 香 | 1 |
| | 飛 | | | 王 | | 金 | | | 2 |
| | | 桂 | 金 | 歩 | 歩 | 銀 | 歩 | | 3 |
| 歩 | | 歩 | | 銀 | | 歩 | | 歩 | 4 |
| | | | 歩 | | 歩 | | | | 5 |
| 歩 | | 歩 | | 銀 | | 歩 | 飛 | 歩 | 6 |
| | 歩 | 銀 | 歩 | 歩 | 金 | 桂 | | | 7 |
| | | 金 | | 玉 | | | | | 8 |
| 香 | 桂 | | | | | | | 香 | 9 |

☗ pieces in hand: 角 歩
Stagecoach
up move 51
☖ pieces in hand: 角 歩

| 9 | 8 | 7 | 6 | 5 | 4 | 3 | 2 | 1 |
| 香 | | | | | | | 桂 | 香 | 1 |
| | 飛 | | | 王 | | 金 | | | 2 |
| | | 桂 | 金 | 歩 | 歩 | 銀 | 歩 | | 3 |
| 歩 | | 歩 | | 銀 | | 歩 | | 歩 | 4 |
| | | | 歩 | | 歩 | | | | 5 |
| 歩 | | 歩 | 歩 | 銀 | | 歩 | 飛 | 歩 | 6 |
| | 歩 | 銀 | | 歩 | 金 | 桂 | | | 7 |
| | | 金 | | 玉 | | | | | 8 |
| 香 | 桂 | | | | | | | 香 | 9 |

☗ pieces in hand: 角 歩

The Stagecoach joseki (駅馬車定跡 ekibasha jouseki) is a symmetrical Double Retreating Rook and Double Reclining Silver variant of Double Wing Attack.

It was named after the American movie Stagecoach.

=== Delaying the pawn trade ===
Retreating Rook
after 12 moves
☖ pieces in hand: –

| 9 | 8 | 7 | 6 | 5 | 4 | 3 | 2 | 1 |
| 香 | 桂 | 銀 | 金 | 王 | | 銀 | 桂 | 香 | 1 |
| | 飛 | | | | | 金 | 角 | | 2 |
| | | 歩 | 歩 | 歩 | 歩 | 歩 | 歩 | 歩 | 3 |
| 歩 | | | | | | | | | 4 |
| | 歩 | | | | | | | | 5 |
| | | | | | | | | | 6 |
| 歩 | 歩 | 歩 | 歩 | 歩 | 歩 | 歩 | | 歩 | 7 |
| | 角 | 金 | | | | | 飛 | | 8 |
| 香 | 桂 | 銀 | | 玉 | 金 | 銀 | 桂 | 香 | 9 |

☗ pieces in hand: 歩
9. ...P-96

White need not trade the eighth file pawns immediately after Black's second file trade. For instance, White may choose to wait and instead advance their right edge pawn.

9. ...P-94. White pushes their ninth file pawn.

Retreating Rook
after 14 moves
☖ pieces in hand: –

| 9 | 8 | 7 | 6 | 5 | 4 | 3 | 2 | 1 |
| 香 | 桂 | 銀 | 金 | 王 | | 銀 | 桂 | 香 | 1 |
| | 飛 | | | | | 金 | 角 | | 2 |
| | | 歩 | 歩 | 歩 | 歩 | 歩 | 歩 | 歩 | 3 |
| 歩 | | | | | | | | | 4 |
| | 歩 | | | | | | | | 5 |
| 歩 | | | | | | | | | 6 |
| | 歩 | 歩 | 歩 | 歩 | 歩 | 歩 | | 歩 | 7 |
| | 角 | 金 | | | | | 飛 | | 8 |
| 香 | 桂 | 銀 | | 玉 | 金 | 銀 | 桂 | 香 | 9 |

☗ pieces in hand: 歩
10. P-96

Retreating Rook
after 17 moves
☖ pieces in hand: –

| 9 | 8 | 7 | 6 | 5 | 4 | 3 | 2 | 1 |
| 香 | 桂 | | 金 | 王 | | 銀 | 桂 | 香 | 1 |
| | 飛 | 銀 | | | | 金 | 角 | | 2 |
| | | 歩 | 歩 | 歩 | 歩 | | 歩 | 歩 | 3 |
| 歩 | | | | | | 歩 | | | 4 |
| | 歩 | | | | | | | | 5 |
| 歩 | | | | | | | | | 6 |
| | 歩 | 歩 | 歩 | 歩 | 歩 | 歩 | | 歩 | 7 |
| | 角 | 金 | | | | 銀 | 飛 | | 8 |
| 香 | 桂 | 銀 | | 玉 | 金 | | 桂 | 香 | 9 |

☗ pieces in hand: 歩
10. ...P-34
11. S-38 S-78

10. P-96. Black usually pushes their same edge pawn in response.

If Black does not respond with their own edge pawn push, then White is threatening to push their edge pawn further to the middle rank 5 (10. ...P-95), which will prevent Black from pushing their edge pawn at all and leaving Black's bishop without a square to escape to from White's pawn drop (P*87). This puts pressure on Black in the sense that Black must carefully prepare any further pawn advancement when their bishop has no path of escape since White may attempt to capture that pawn after the eighth file pawn trade. (Note: For example, if a premature preparation for Reclining Silver with 10. S-38 P-95, 11. P-46, then 11. ...P-86, 12. Px86 Rx86. Since Black needs to protect their bishop from White's pawn drop, White can take the fourth file pawn: 13. P*87 Rx46.)

☖ pieces in hand: –

| 9 | 8 | 7 | 6 | 5 | 4 | 3 | 2 | 1 |
| 香 | 桂 | 銀 | 金 | 王 | | 銀 | 桂 | 香 | 1 |
| | 飛 | | | | | 金 | 角 | | 2 |
| | | 歩 | 歩 | 歩 | 歩 | 歩 | 歩 | 歩 | 3 |
| | | | | | | | | | 4 |
| 歩 | 歩 | | | | | | | | 5 |
| | | | | | 歩 | | | | 6 |
| 歩 | 歩 | 歩 | 歩 | 歩 | | 歩 | | 歩 | 7 |
| | 角 | 金 | | | | 銀 | 飛 | | 8 |
| 香 | 桂 | 銀 | | 玉 | 金 | | 桂 | 香 | 9 |

☗ pieces in hand: 歩
10. S-38 P-95
11. P-46?
☖ pieces in hand: 歩

| 9 | 8 | 7 | 6 | 5 | 4 | 3 | 2 | 1 |
| 香 | 桂 | 銀 | 金 | 王 | | 銀 | 桂 | 香 | 1 |
| | | | | | | 金 | 角 | | 2 |
| | | 歩 | 歩 | 歩 | 歩 | 歩 | 歩 | 歩 | 3 |
| | | | | | | | | | 4 |
| 歩 | | | | | | | | | 5 |
| | 飛 | | | | 歩 | | | | 6 |
| 歩 | | 歩 | 歩 | 歩 | | 歩 | | 歩 | 7 |
| | 角 | 金 | | | | 銀 | 飛 | | 8 |
| 香 | 桂 | 銀 | | 玉 | 金 | | 桂 | 香 | 9 |

☗ pieces in hand: 歩歩
12. Px86 Rx86

☖ pieces in hand: 歩歩

| 9 | 8 | 7 | 6 | 5 | 4 | 3 | 2 | 1 |
| 香 | 桂 | 銀 | 金 | 王 | | 銀 | 桂 | 香 | 1 |
| | | | | | | 金 | 角 | | 2 |
| | | 歩 | 歩 | 歩 | 歩 | 歩 | 歩 | 歩 | 3 |
| | | | | | | | | | 4 |
| 歩 | | | | | | | | | 5 |
| | | | | | 飛 | | | | 6 |
| 歩 | 歩 | 歩 | 歩 | 歩 | | 歩 | | 歩 | 7 |
| | 角 | 金 | | | | 銀 | 飛 | | 8 |
| 香 | 桂 | 銀 | | 玉 | 金 | | 桂 | 香 | 9 |

☗ pieces in hand: 歩
13. P*87 Rx46

10. ...P-34. White activates their bishop by opening its diagonal.

Other moves are possible such as making the rook pawn trade now (with 10. ...P-86) or advancing their attacking silver (10. ...S-72).

11. S-38. Black advances their right silver up the third file allowing for both Climbing Silver or Reclining Silver options.

11. ...S-72. White also develops their right silver in the same way.

== See also ==
- Double Wing Attack
- Double Wing Floating Rook
- Static Rook

== Bibliography ==
- Aono, Teruichi (2009) [1983]. Better Moves for Better Shogi. Translated by Fairbairn, John (2nd ed.). Ishi Press. ISBN 978-4-87187-999-6.
- Aono, Teruichi (1983). Guide to shogi openings: Unlock the secrets of joseki 将棋定跡のカギ: 和英 定跡問題集. Translated by Fairbairn, John. 山海堂. ISBN 4-381-00598-8.
- Hosking, Tony (1996). The art of shogi. The Shogi Foundation. ISBN 978-0-95310-890-9.
- Kitao, Madoka (2011). Joseki at a glance. Translated by Kawasaki, Tomohide. Nekomado. ISBN 978-4-9052-2501-0.
- 野月, 浩貴 [in Japanese] (2013). 相掛かり無敵定跡研究. マイナビ出版. ISBN 978-4-8399-4819-1.
- "相掛かりナビゲーション: 駅馬車定跡". 山崎隆之の将棋講座. Episode 1. 銀河将棋チャンネル – via Niconico. (in Japanese)
