= No Guard =

Shogi opening

No Guard
☖ pieces in hand: 角歩歩

9	8	7	6	5	4	3	2	1
香	桂	銀	金	王	金	銀	桂	香	1
									2
歩		歩	歩	歩	歩			歩	3
						歩	飛		4
									5
	飛	歩							6
歩			歩	歩	歩	歩		歩	7
	馬	金							8
香	桂	銀		玉	金	銀	桂	香	9

☗ pieces in hand: 歩歩

No Guard (ノーガード nō gādo) is a variation of the Double Static Rook shogi opening, classified as a subvariation of the Double Wing Attack opening with mutually open bishop diagonals. The name "No Guard" originates from White's decision to forgo their defensive left gold development (...G-32) in favor of an early bishop trade, enabling a rapid attack with the bishop in hand. The absence of the defensive gold leaves White without a "guard".

The opening is considered speculative since it is thought to favor Black and is not used by professional shogi players. However, it is tactical and quickly enters the endgame consequently being challenging to defend against successfully by some amateur players.

== Development ==
Double Wing with Open Bishop Diagonals
☖ pieces in hand: –

9	8	7	6	5	4	3	2	1
香	桂	銀	金	王	金	銀	桂	香	1
	飛						角		2
歩		歩	歩	歩	歩		歩	歩	3
						歩			4
	歩						歩		5
		歩							6
歩	歩		歩	歩	歩	歩		歩	7
	角	金					飛		8
香	桂	銀		玉	金	銀	桂	香	9

☗ pieces in hand: –

1.P-76 P-34 2.P-26 P-84 3.P-25 P-85. The branch of this variation starts after both players advance their rook pawns and open their bishop diagonals.

4.G-78. Black plays the defensive move by developing their left gold to the seventh file so that it protects the 87 and 88 squares.

The position at this point is Double Wing Attack opening (where both players exchange their rook pawns off the board) with mutually open bishop diagonals (see: Double Wing Attack§Open bishop diagonal variation), which most commonly develops into a Side Pawn Capture opening after Black takes White's side pawn.

However, these openings progress as usual only when White mirrors Black's defensive gold move with 4...G-32, which is the joseki move. In contrast, in the No Guard opening, White does not mirror Black's position and instead initiates a rook pawn trade before Black leaving their left gold on its starting square.

No Guard
☖ pieces in hand: –

9	8	7	6	5	4	3	2	1
香	桂	銀	金	王	金	銀	桂	香	1
	飛						角		2
歩		歩	歩	歩	歩		歩	歩	3
						歩			4
							歩		5
	歩	歩							6
歩	歩		歩	歩	歩	歩		歩	7
	角	金					飛		8
香	桂	銀		玉	金	銀	桂	香	9

☗ pieces in hand: –
4...P-86
No Guard
☖ pieces in hand: 歩

9	8	7	6	5	4	3	2	1
香	桂	銀	金	王	金	銀	桂	香	1
							角		2
歩		歩	歩	歩	歩		歩	歩	3
						歩			4
							歩		5
	飛	歩							6
歩			歩	歩	歩	歩		歩	7
	角	金					飛		8
香	桂	銀		玉	金	銀	桂	香	9

☗ pieces in hand: 歩
5.Px86 Rx86

4...P-86 5.Px86 Rx86. White exchanges their rook pawn.

Usually after the typical 1.P-76 P-34 2.P-26 P-84 3.P-25 P-85 4.G-78 G-32 Side Pawn Capture sequence, it is Black that first exchanges the rook pawn with 5.P-24 Px24 6.Rx24. In No Guard, White is trying to gain the initiative by making the exchange first. And, in order to do so, White does not spend time with the 4...G-32 defense.

=== ☗6.P-24 ===
No Guard
☖ pieces in hand: 歩歩

9	8	7	6	5	4	3	2	1
香	桂	銀	金	王	金	銀	桂	香	1
							角		2
歩		歩	歩	歩	歩			歩	3
						歩	飛		4
									5
	飛	歩							6
歩			歩	歩	歩	歩		歩	7
	角	金							8
香	桂	銀		玉	金	銀	桂	香	9

☗ pieces in hand: 歩歩
6.P-24 Px24 7.Rx24

6.P-24 Px24 7.Rx24. Black follows White in also making the rook pawn exchange. Both players now have two pawns in head each.

Black is not required to exchange their rook pawn here. If Black prefers not to play the main No Guard lines, then they can foil White's plans with 6.P*87, which forces White's rook to retreat and closes the eighth file to Black's rook attacks. However, doing this definitely prevents any possibility of playing a usual Side Pawn Capture-like opening for Black putting them into Double Wing opening territory. (See §☗6.P*87 below.)

No Guard
☖ pieces in hand: 角歩歩

9	8	7	6	5	4	3	2	1
香	桂	銀	金	王	金	銀	桂	香	1
									2
歩		歩	歩	歩	歩			歩	3
						歩	飛		4
									5
	飛	歩							6
歩			歩	歩	歩	歩		歩	7
	馬	金							8
香	桂	銀		玉	金	銀	桂	香	9

☗ pieces in hand: 歩歩
7...Bx88+
No Guard
☖ pieces in hand: 歩歩

9	8	7	6	5	4	3	2	1
香	桂	銀	金	王	金	銀	桂	香	1
									2
歩		歩	歩	歩	歩			歩	3
						歩	飛		4
									5
	飛	歩							6
歩			歩	歩	歩	歩		歩	7
	銀	金							8
香	桂			玉	金	銀	桂	香	9

☗ pieces in hand: 角歩歩
8.Sx88

7...Bx88+ 8.Sx88. Since White has gained tempo by omitting ...G-32, they now make a bishop trade to start the No Guard deviation.

Side Pawn/Double Wing Transposition
☖ pieces in hand: 角歩歩

9	8	7	6	5	4	3	2	1
香	桂	銀	金	王		銀	桂	香	1
						金	角		2
歩		歩	歩	歩	歩			歩	3
						歩	飛		4
									5
	飛	歩							6
歩			歩	歩	歩	歩		歩	7
	角	金							8
香	桂	銀		玉	金	銀	桂	香	9

☗ pieces in hand: 歩歩
7...G-32

Before this bishop exchange, White still had the possibility of playing the standard 7...G-32, which will then transpose to the usual Side Pawn Capture/Double Wing opening (that has the more common order of 1.P-76 P-34 2.P-26 P-84 3.P-25 P-85 4.G-78 G-32 5.P-24 Px24 6.Px24 P-86 7.Px86 Rx86).

No Guard
☖ pieces in hand: 歩歩

9	8	7	6	5	4	3	2	1
香	桂	銀	金	王	金	銀	桂	香	1
									2
歩		歩	歩	歩	歩	角		歩	3
						歩	飛		4
									5
	飛	歩							6
歩			歩	歩	歩	歩		歩	7
	銀	金							8
香	桂			玉	金	銀	桂	香	9

☗ pieces in hand: 角歩歩
8...B*33

8...B*33. White tries to take advantage of Black's vulnerable rook by forking the rook and Black's left silver. Since Black will presumably move their rook in order to prevent its capture, White's bishop aims at the 88 square, which is also being targeted by White's rook.

==== Main line: ☗9.Rx21+ ====
No Guard
☖ pieces in hand: 歩歩

9	8	7	6	5	4	3	2	1
香	桂	銀	金	王	金	銀	龍	香	1
									2
歩		歩	歩	歩	歩	角		歩	3
						歩			4
									5
	飛	歩							6
歩			歩	歩	歩	歩		歩	7
	銀	金							8
香	桂			玉	金	銀	桂	香	9

☗ pieces in hand: 角 桂 歩歩
9.Rx21+
No Guard
☖ pieces in hand: 銀 歩歩

9	8	7	6	5	4	3	2	1
香	桂	銀	金	王	金	銀	龍	香	1
									2
歩		歩	歩	歩	歩	角		歩	3
						歩			4
									5
		歩							6
歩			歩	歩	歩	歩		歩	7
	龍	金							8
香	桂			玉	金	銀	桂	香	9

☗ pieces in hand: 角 桂 歩歩
9...Rx88+

9.Rx21+. The counterattacking capture of White's knight while also promoting the rook is the strongest response for Black.

9...Rx88+. White continues the attack by capturing Black's silver. Black's 88 square only has one defender, so White can recapture with their bishop to break into Black's camp.

No Guard
☖ pieces in hand: 金 銀 歩歩

9	8	7	6	5	4	3	2	1
香	桂	銀	金	王	金	銀	龍	香	1
									2
歩		歩	歩	歩	歩			歩	3
						歩			4
									5
		歩							6
歩			歩	歩	歩	歩		歩	7
	馬								8
香	桂			玉	金	銀	桂	香	9

☗ pieces in hand: 飛 角 桂 歩歩
10.Gx88 Bx88+

10.Gx88 Bx88+. Black recaptures with the defending gold, and White takes it with the bishop.

==== ☗9.R-28 ====
No Guard
☖ pieces in hand: 歩歩

9	8	7	6	5	4	3	2	1
香	桂	銀	金	王	金	銀	桂	香	1
									2
歩		歩	歩	歩	歩	角		歩	3
						歩			4
									5
	飛	歩							6
歩			歩	歩	歩	歩		歩	7
	銀	金					飛		8
香	桂			玉	金	銀	桂	香	9

☗ pieces in hand: 角 歩歩
9.R-28

9.R-28. In this line, Black retreats the rook back to safety and adds a defender to rank 8, which allows a recapture should White attack the 88 square with ...Bx88+ Gx88 Rx88+ Rx88.

No Guard
☖ pieces in hand: 歩歩

9	8	7	6	5	4	3	2	1
香	桂	銀	金	王	金	銀	桂	香	1
									2
歩		歩	歩	歩	歩	角		歩	3
						歩			4
									5
	飛	歩							6
歩			歩	歩	歩	歩	歩	歩	7
	銀	金					飛		8
香	桂			玉	金	銀	桂	香	9

☗ pieces in hand: 角 歩歩
9...P*27

9....P*27. However, White can follow up with a pawn strike on 27.

=== ☗6.P*87 ===
No Guard
☖ pieces in hand: 歩

9	8	7	6	5	4	3	2	1
香	桂	銀	金	王	金	銀	桂	香	1
							角		2
歩		歩	歩	歩	歩		歩	歩	3
						歩			4
							歩		5
	飛	歩							6
歩	歩		歩	歩	歩	歩		歩	7
	角	金					飛		8
香	桂	銀		玉	金	銀	桂	香	9

☗ pieces in hand: 歩
6.P*87

== See also ==
- Double Wing Attack
- Side Pawn Capture
- Static Rook

== Bibliography ==
- 週刊将棋編 (2016) [1997]. "最短！ノーガード戦法". 将棋・B級戦法の達人. マイナビ出版. pp. 209–222.
