= Tsukada Special =

Shogi strategy

In shogi, Tsukada Special (塚田スペシャル tsukada supesharu) is a Floating Rook variant of the Double Wing Attack shogi opening developed by professional Yasuaki Tsukada in the 1980s.

The strategy is characterized by an aggressive offense at a very early stage of the game and a particular positioning of Black's rook on the 24 square after a pawn exchange initiated by Black dropping a pawn on 24.

According to Kiyokazu Katsumata, the Tsukada Special has been influential on many different openings, especially the Twisting Rook opening as well as Ranging Rook strategies.

== Initial positioning ==
Double Wing Floating Rook
position after 11 moves
☖ pieces in hand: –

9	8	7	6	5	4	3	2	1
香	桂	銀	金	王		銀	桂	香	1
	飛					金	角		2
歩		歩	歩	歩	歩	歩	歩	歩	3
									4
	歩								5
							飛		6
歩	歩	歩	歩	歩	歩	歩		歩	7
	角	金							8
香	桂	銀		玉	金	銀	桂	香	9

☗ pieces in hand: 歩

6.	R-26

Tsukada Special
position after 14 moves
☖ pieces in hand: –

9	8	7	6	5	4	3	2	1
香	桂		金	王		銀	桂	香	1
	飛	銀				金	角		2
歩		歩	歩	歩	歩	歩	歩		3
								歩	4
	歩								5
							飛	歩	6
歩	歩	歩	歩	歩	歩	歩			7
	角	金							8
香	桂	銀		玉	金	銀	桂	香	9

☗ pieces in hand: 歩

6.	...	S-72
7.	P-16	P-14

6. R-26. After the main opening lines of Double Wing Attack Floating Rook, Black floats their rook to 26 temporarily preventing White from exchanging pawns on the eighth file.

6. ...S-72/S-62. White now has a major choice of whether to move their right silver to either 72 or 62. The 72 option is the newer joseki position. Staying on the seventh file (S-72) allows White the options of playing either Climbing Silver (advancing down the eighth file) or Reclining Silver (advancing to the central file) while moving the silver to the sixth file (S-62) favors Reclining Silver since White's Climbing Silver will be slower (due to the pawn blocking advancement at 63). Another difference is that S-72 does not block the king from moving to 62 and 71, which may be an important escape route if Black is able to penetrate White's camp before White can castle. However, with the S-72 move, White's pawn in front of the king at 53 remains undefended in contrast with the S-62 move. In the diagram and the immediately following discussion, S-72 is shown.

7. P-16. After White's choice of their silver movement, Black advances their edge pawn on the first file. Moving Black's edge pawn allows the lance to be free to move to 17 in order for it to be defended by the knight on 29, which may be beneficial if White can drop a bishop on an undefended 28 square. Additionally, the open 17 square allows the knight a place to flee from a pawn drop by White at 28. And, if Black's rook can reach the 24 square, then an edge attack with the first file pawn, a dropped pawn, and the lance may be possible.

7. ...P-14. White mirrors Black's edge pawn so that their bishop can move to 13, which allows (i) defense of 24 from Black's rook, (ii) a possible attack on 57, (iii) an escape route in case White's camp along the second file is broken, and (iv) prevents Black's knight from attacking White's lance if positioned on 13 after Black's pawn drop on 13 since the lance can move forward to 14. The advanced pawn also prevents Black's pawn from further encroachment on the first file.

Tsukada Special
position after 15 moves
☖ pieces in hand: –

9	8	7	6	5	4	3	2	1
香	桂		金	王		銀	桂	香	1
	飛	銀				金	角		2
歩		歩	歩	歩	歩	歩	歩		3
								歩	4
	歩								5
							飛	歩	6
歩	歩	歩	歩	歩	歩	歩			7
	角	金				銀			8
香	桂	銀		玉	金		桂	香	9

☗ pieces in hand: 歩

8.	S-38	...

Tsukada Special
position after 17 moves
☖ pieces in hand: –

9	8	7	6	5	4	3	2	1
香	桂		金	王		銀	桂	香	1
	飛	銀				金	角		2
歩		歩		歩	歩	歩	歩		3
			歩					歩	4
	歩								5
		歩					飛	歩	6
歩	歩		歩	歩	歩	歩			7
	角	金				銀			8
香	桂	銀		玉	金		桂	香	9

☗ pieces in hand: 歩

8.	...	P-64
9.	P-76

8. P-38. Black then advances their silver on the third file. This position has the same benefits as White's S-72 choice and defends the 27 square from any future bishop drop on that square by White.

8. ...P-64. White moves their sixth file pawn allowing an opening for the Reclining Silver position (which is S-54).

9. P-76. Black responds by opening their bishop diagonal.

Tsukada Special
position after 18 moves
☖ pieces in hand: –

9	8	7	6	5	4	3	2	1
香	桂		金	王		銀	桂	香	1
	飛	銀				金	角		2
歩		歩		歩	歩	歩	歩		3
			歩					歩	4
									5
	歩	歩					飛	歩	6
歩	歩		歩	歩	歩	歩			7
	角	金				銀			8
香	桂	銀		玉	金		桂	香	9

☗ pieces in hand: 歩

9.	...	P-86

Tsukada Special
position after 21 moves
☖ pieces in hand: 歩

9	8	7	6	5	4	3	2	1
香	桂		金	王		銀	桂	香	1
		銀				金	角		2
歩		歩		歩	歩	歩	歩		3
			歩				歩	歩	4
									5
	飛	歩					飛	歩	6
歩			歩	歩	歩	歩			7
	角	金				銀			8
香	桂	銀		玉	金		桂	香	9

☗ pieces in hand: 歩

10.	Px86	Rx86
11.	P*24

9. ...P-86. Once Black's bishop diagonal is open, the advanced pawn now prevents Black's rook from defending rank 6. This allows White to initiate a pawn exchange on the eighth file by attacking the head of Black's bishop.

10. Px86 Rx86. Pawn exchange via White's rook.

11. P*24. Black drops a pawn to attack the bishop's head again for another pawn exchange. This is an essential characteristic of the Tsukada Special.

Tsukada Special
position after 23 moves
☖ pieces in hand: 歩歩

9	8	7	6	5	4	3	2	1
香	桂		金	王		銀	桂	香	1
		銀				金	角		2
歩		歩		歩	歩	歩			3
			歩				飛	歩	4
									5
	飛	歩						歩	6
歩			歩	歩	歩	歩			7
	角	金				銀			8
香	桂	銀		玉	金		桂	香	9

☗ pieces in hand: 歩歩

11.	...	Px24
12.	Rx24

Tsukada Special
position after 24 moves
☖ pieces in hand: 歩歩

9	8	7	6	5	4	3	2	1
香	桂		金	王		銀	桂	香	1
	飛	銀				金	角		2
歩		歩		歩	歩	歩			3
			歩				飛	歩	4
									5
		歩						歩	6
歩			歩	歩	歩	歩			7
	角	金				銀			8
香	桂	銀		玉	金		桂	香	9

☗ pieces in hand: 歩歩

12.	...	R-82

11. ...Px24, 12. Rx24. After the Tsukada Special pawn exchange, Black's rook is in positioned on rank 4. From here, Black may have the possibility to start an edge attack on the first file or possibly capture White's floating pawn on 64.

Tsukada Special
position after 25 moves
☖ pieces in hand: 歩歩

9	8	7	6	5	4	3	2	1
香	桂		金	王		銀	桂	香	1
	飛	銀				金	角		2
歩		歩		歩	歩	歩			3
			歩				飛	歩	4
								歩	5
		歩							6
歩			歩	歩	歩	歩			7
	角	金				銀			8
香	桂	銀		玉	金		桂	香	9

☗ pieces in hand: 歩歩

13.	P-15

Tsukada Special
position after 27 moves
☖ pieces in hand: 歩歩

9	8	7	6	5	4	3	2	1
香	桂		金	王		銀	桂	香	1
	飛	銀				金	角		2
歩		歩		歩	歩	歩			3
	歩		歩				飛	歩	4
								歩	5
	歩	歩							6
歩			歩	歩	歩	歩			7
	角	金				銀			8
香	桂	銀		玉	金		桂	香	9

☗ pieces in hand: 歩歩

13.	...	P*86
14.	P*84

== Opening White's bishop diagonal (8. ...P-34) ==
Tsukada Special
position after 15 moves
☖ pieces in hand: –

9	8	7	6	5	4	3	2	1
香	桂		金	王		銀	桂	香	1
	飛	銀				金	角		2
歩		歩	歩	歩	歩	歩	歩		3
								歩	4
	歩								5
							飛	歩	6
歩	歩	歩	歩	歩	歩	歩			7
	角	金				銀			8
香	桂	銀		玉	金		桂	香	9

☗ pieces in hand: 歩

1.	P-26	P-84
2.	P-25	P-85
3.	G-78	G-32
4.	P-24	Px24
5.	Rx24	P*23
6.	R-26	S-72
7.	P-16	P-14
8.	S-38

Tsukada Special
position after 16 moves
☖ pieces in hand: –

9	8	7	6	5	4	3	2	1
香	桂		金	王		銀	桂	香	1
	飛	銀				金	角		2
歩		歩	歩	歩	歩		歩		3
						歩		歩	4
	歩								5
							飛	歩	6
歩	歩	歩	歩	歩	歩	歩			7
	角	金				銀			8
香	桂	銀		玉	金		桂	香	9

☗ pieces in hand: 歩

8.	...	P-34

Tsukada Special Variant
position after 23 moves
☖ pieces in hand: 歩歩

9	8	7	6	5	4	3	2	1
香	桂		金	王		銀	桂	香	1
		銀				金	角		2
歩		歩	歩	歩	歩				3
						歩	飛	歩	4
									5
	飛	歩						歩	6
歩			歩	歩	歩	歩			7
	角	金				銀			8
香	桂	銀		玉	金		桂	香	9

☗ pieces in hand: 歩歩

9.	P-76	P-86
10.	Px86	Rx86
11.	P*24	Px24
12.	Rx24

8. ...P-34, 9. P-76. If White chooses to open their bishop's diagonal (P-34) instead of preparing for Reclining Silver (P-64) at move 16, then Black can also open their bishop's diagonal.

9. ...P-86, 10. Px86 Rx86. White exchanges pawns on the eighth file.

11. P*24 Px24, 12. Rx24. Black initiates the Tsukada Special pawn exchange. And, after the pawn exchanges on both sides, the board can reach a position that resembles the Side Pawn Capture opening.

At this point, there are also a number of move missteps that White is at risk of making that lead to stronger positions for Black including even some forced checkmate traps.

=== Checkmate sequence 12. ...R-84 ===
Tsukada Special Trap
position after 24 moves
☖ pieces in hand: 歩歩

9	8	7	6	5	4	3	2	1
香	桂		金	王		銀	桂	香	1
			銀			金	角		2
歩		歩	歩	歩	歩				3
	飛					歩	飛	歩	4
									5
		歩						歩	6
歩			歩	歩	歩	歩			7
	角	金				銀			8
香	桂	銀		玉	金		桂	香	9

☗ pieces in hand: 歩歩

12.	...	R-84

Tsukada Special Trap
position after 37 moves
☖ pieces in hand: 角角 銀 桂 香 歩歩

9	8	7	6	5	4	3	2	1
香	桂		金			銀	桂	香	1
			銀	王			龍		2
歩		歩	歩	歩	歩				3
						歩		歩	4
									5
		歩						歩	6
歩			歩	歩	歩	歩			7
		金				銀			8
龍			金	玉	金		桂	香	9

☗ pieces in hand: 歩歩

13.	Bx22+	Sx22
14.	B*66	Rx99+
15.	Bx22+	Gx22
16.	Rx22+	+Rx79
17.	G*69	+Rx99
18.	S*42	K-52
19.	S-31=	...

12. ...R-84. For example, if White had moved their silver to the sixth file on move 12 (that is, 6. ...S-62) and at move 24 reacts to Black's rook on 24 by moving their rook to 84 to protect the side pawn at 34, a series of moves will lead to a checkmate by Black.

13. Bx22+ Sx22, 14. B*66. Black can trade the bishops and then drop their bishop to 66 attacking both White's rook and silver.

14. ...Rx99+, 15. Bx22+. White's rook can capture Black's knight and promote while Black can capture White's silver.

15. ...Gx22, 16. Rx22+. White's gold captures the bishop, but Black recaptures with their rook and promotes.

16. ...+Rx79, 17. G*69. If White's rook captures Black's silver checking their king, Black can block White's rook by dropping a gold between the rook and king.

17. ...+Rx99. White's rook can escape and capture Black's lance.

18. S*42 K-52, 19. S-31=. But then, Black starts the forced checkmate by dropping a silver on the fourth file checking White's king. The king retreats to rank 2, but the silver can move to the third file unpromoted leaving Black's dragon to check the king. No matter whether the king moves to rank 1 or another piece is dropped, Black's dragon checkmates via the fourth file (+R-42) in the next move.

Note that if White had played S-72 earlier in the opening (instead of S-62), then their king would have had an escape route from this particular checking sequence.

== See also ==
- Double Wing Attack Floating Rook
- Double Wing Attack
- Shogi opening
- Shogi strategy and tactics

== Bibliography ==
- Hosking, Tony (1997). The art of shogi. The Shogi Foundation. ISBN 978-0-95310-890-9.
- "kieta senpō no nazo" 消えた戦法の謎 [Quest of the lost systems]. Shogi.Net. Mainichi Communications Co. 1995. · Partial translation of 消えた戦法の謎 kieta senpō no nazo by Kiyokazu Katsumata.
- 塚田スペシャル: △6二銀型. 山崎隆之の将棋講座: 相掛かりナビゲーション. Episode 2 (in Japanese). 2016. 銀河将棋チャンネル – via Niconico.
- 塚田スペシャル: △7二銀型. 山崎隆之の将棋講座: 相掛かりナビゲーション. Episode 3 (in Japanese). 2016. 銀河将棋チャンネル – via Niconico.
- 塚田スペシャル: 山崎の研究. 山崎隆之の将棋講座: 相掛かりナビゲーション. Episode 4 (in Japanese). 2016. 銀河将棋チャンネル – via Niconico.
