= Double Static Rook =

Type of shogi opening

Double Static Rook
☖ pieces in hand: –

9	8	7	6	5	4	3	2	1
香	桂		金	王		銀	桂	香	1
	飛	銀				金	角		2
		歩	歩	歩	歩	歩	歩	歩	3
歩									4
	歩								5
歩									6
	歩	歩	歩	歩	歩	歩		歩	7
	角	金				銀	飛		8
香	桂	銀		玉	金		桂	香	9

☗ pieces in hand: 歩
Double Wing Attack is a Double Static Rook opening where both players keep their rooks on their starting files (the second and eighth files for Black and White, respectively).

Double Static Rook (相居飛車 ai-ibisha) positions are shogi openings in which both players use a Static Rook position.

== Relation to castles ==
Most Static Rook openings coincide with a castle development on the player's left side of board.

In Double Static Rook openings, a Static Rook player's king is initially threatened from above by the opponent's rook which has remained on its starting square.

Castles in Double Static Rook openings have a wide variety of forms that are dependent upon the specific opening used. Some openings like Fortress and Bishop Exchange openings have the king moved leftward away from the rook in compact castles while openings like Double Wing Attack and Side Pawn Capture have rather minimal castle formations with much less king safety in a trade off of defending wider areas within the Static Rook side's camp in order to defend against future piece drops.

== Double Static Rook openings ==
=== Double Wing Attack ===
Double Wing Attack
☖ pieces in hand: –

9	8	7	6	5	4	3	2	1
香	桂		金	王		銀	桂	香	1
	飛	銀				金	角		2
歩		歩	歩	歩	歩	歩	歩	歩	3
									4
	歩						歩		5
									6
歩	歩	歩	歩	歩	歩	歩		歩	7
	角	金				銀	飛		8
香	桂	銀		玉	金		桂	香	9

☗ pieces in hand: –

Double Wing Attack is a Double Static Rook opening where both sides play Static Rook with the first several moves on each side being identical or very similar. Both sides advance their rook pawns to the middle rank 5. Then, golds are moved to defend each bishop's head. Afterwards, pawns on both rook files exchange. Then, the joseki branches off into several different josekis and strategies. Double Wing is most commonly played in modern times with both players' bishop diagonals closed initially.

Double Wing Attack is one of the oldest Double Static Rook openings dating from around 1625 and preceding other openings such as Snowroof, Fortress, and Bishop Exchange.

==== Tsukada Special ====
Tsukada Special
☖ pieces in hand: 歩

9	8	7	6	5	4	3	2	1
香	桂		金	王		銀	桂	香	1
		銀				金	角		2
歩		歩		歩	歩	歩	歩		3
			歩				歩	歩	4
									5
	飛	歩					飛	歩	6
歩			歩	歩	歩	歩			7
	角	金				銀			8
香	桂	銀		玉	金		桂	香	9

☗ pieces in hand: 歩

Tsukada Special is a Floating Rook variant of the Double Wing Attack opening developed by professional Yasuaki Tsukada.

==== No Guard ====
No Guard
☖ pieces in hand: 歩歩

9	8	7	6	5	4	3	2	1
香	桂	銀	金	王	金	銀	龍	香	1
									2
歩		歩	歩	歩	歩	角		歩	3
						歩			4
									5
	飛	歩							6
歩			歩	歩	歩	歩		歩	7
	銀	金							8
香	桂			玉	金	銀	桂	香	9

☗ pieces in hand: 角 桂 歩歩

=== Side Pawn Capture ===
Side Pawn Capture
☖ pieces in hand: 歩歩

9	8	7	6	5	4	3	2	1
香	桂	銀	金	王		銀	桂	香	1
	飛					金			2
歩		歩	歩	歩	歩	角		歩	3
						飛			4
									5
	飛	歩							6
歩			歩	歩	歩	歩		歩	7
	角	金							8
香	桂	銀		玉	金	銀	桂	香	9

☗ pieces in hand: 歩歩歩

Side Pawn Capture has the same form as a Double Wing Attack opening with both players' bishop diagonals open. (Double Wing Attack with open bishop diagonals was more commonly played before the twentieth century while in modern times it usually keeps the bishop diagonals closed initially.) However, it deviates from Double Wing Attack when one player (usually Black) or both players capture the opponent's side pawn with their rook in a gambit move. The side pawns referred to are the pawns that are advanced in order to open both players' bishop diagonal (on 44 for White and 76 for Black). The games often have a different character compared with Double Wing Attack and can often feature very dynamic play.

=== Snowroof ===
Fortress vs Snowroof
☖ pieces in hand: –

9	8	7	6	5	4	3	2	1
香	桂	銀	金	王			桂	香	1
	飛					金			2
歩		歩	歩	歩	銀	角	歩	歩	3
					歩	歩			4
	歩						歩		5
		歩							6
歩	歩	角	歩	歩	歩	歩		歩	7
	銀	金			銀		飛		8
香	桂		玉		金		桂	香	9

☗ pieces in hand: –

The Snowroof strategy is named after the use of a Snowroof castle. This old opening predates the Fortress opening and was especially popular before the 1950s after which its popularity waned. Recently, the second decade of the 21st century has seen a surge of renewed interest in the strategy among professional shogi players.

=== Fortress ===
Fortress
☖ pieces in hand: –

9	8	7	6	5	4	3	2	1
香	桂				王	角	桂	香	1
	飛		銀	金		金			2
歩			歩			銀	歩	歩	3
	歩	歩		歩	歩	歩			4
									5
		歩	歩	歩		歩	歩		6
歩	歩	銀			歩			歩	7
		金		金	銀		飛		8
香	桂	角	玉				桂	香	9

☗ pieces in hand: –

Fortress is a Static Rook opening as well as the name of a castle associated with the opening.

When both players use a Fortress opening, it is known as a Double Fortress.

The board diagram here shows the standardized first 24 moves of a typical Double Fortress opening where both players aim to build Fortress castles. Here the Fortress castles are not yet complete. At this point, the Double Fortress opening branches off into numerous strategies.

=== Bishop Exchange ===
Bishop Exchange
☖ pieces in hand: 角

9	8	7	6	5	4	3	2	1
香	桂			王			桂	香	1
	飛		銀	金		金			2
歩			歩	歩	歩	銀	歩	歩	3
		歩				歩			4
	歩						歩		5
		歩				歩			6
歩	歩	銀	歩	歩	歩			歩	7
		金	玉			銀	飛		8
香	桂				金		桂	香	9

☗ pieces in hand: 角

Bishop Exchange is a Double Static Rook opening in which each player's bishop is captured so that they keep their bishops in hand.

=== Static Bishop Left Mino ===
Fortress vs Left Mino
☖ pieces in hand: –

9	8	7	6	5	4	3	2	1
香			金		金	王	桂	香	1
	飛					銀	角		2
歩		桂	銀	歩	歩		歩	歩	3
		歩	歩			歩			4
	歩						歩		5
		歩	歩	歩					6
歩	歩	銀	金		歩	歩		歩	7
		金					飛		8
香	桂	角		玉		銀	桂	香	9

☗ pieces in hand: –

Static Bishop Left Mino (居角左美濃 ikaku hidari minō) is a Static Rook strategy used in Double Static Rook games by White when Black attempts a Fortress strategy.

== Bibliography ==
- Aono, Teruichi (1983). Guide to shogi openings: Unlock the secrets of joseki 将棋定跡のカギ: 和英 定跡問題集. Translated by Fairbairn, John. 山海堂. ISBN 4-381-00598-8.
- Fairbairn, John (1980). "Introduction to the static-rook". Shogi (25): 10–11.
- Fairbairn, John (1986). Shogi for beginners (2nd ed.). Ishi Press. ISBN 978-4-8718-720-10.
- Hodges, George, ed. (1977). "Shogi openings". Shogi (10): 9, 12–13.
- Hosking, Tony (1996). The art of shogi. The Shogi Foundation. ISBN 978-0-95310-890-9.
- Kitao, Madoka (2011). Joseki at a glance. Translated by Kawasaki, Tomohide. Nekomado. ISBN 978-4-9052-2501-0.
- 小林, 裕士 [Kobayashi, Hiroshi] (2019). とっておきの雁木破り. マイナビ出版. pp. 142–156.
- 週刊将棋編 (2016) [1997]. "最短！ノーガード戦法". 将棋・Ｂ級戦法の達人. マイナビ出版. pp. 209–222.
