= Double Wing Attack, Floating Rook =

Shogi opening

Floating Rook
position after 11 moves
☖ pieces in hand: –

9	8	7	6	5	4	3	2	1
香	桂	銀	金	王		銀	桂	香	1
	飛					金	角		2
歩		歩	歩	歩	歩	歩	歩	歩	3
									4
	歩								5
							飛		6
歩	歩	歩	歩	歩	歩	歩		歩	7
	角	金							8
香	桂	銀		玉	金	銀	桂	香	9

☗ pieces in hand: 歩
6. R-26

In shogi, Floating Rook (浮き飛車 ukibisha) is a variation of the Double Wing Attack (相掛かり aigakari) opening in which Black's rook falls back to rank 6 (R-26) aiming to protect this rank and prevent White from exchanging pawns on the eighth file to get a pawn in hand.

The translated term floating is synonymous with the term hanging as in hanging piece used in western chess where floating means a piece that is not defended by another piece.

From this position, there are numerous subvariants.

== Development ==
6. R-26. Floating Rook.

Silver-72 option
move 12
☖ pieces in hand: –

9	8	7	6	5	4	3	2	1
香	桂		金	王		銀	桂	香	1
	飛	銀				金	角		2
歩		歩	歩	歩	歩	歩	歩	歩	3
									4
	歩								5
							飛		6
歩	歩	歩	歩	歩	歩	歩		歩	7
	角	金							8
香	桂	銀		玉	金	銀	桂	香	9

☗ pieces in hand: 歩
Silver-62 option
move 12
☖ pieces in hand: –

9	8	7	6	5	4	3	2	1
香	桂		金	王		銀	桂	香	1
	飛		銀			金	角		2
歩		歩	歩	歩	歩	歩	歩	歩	3
									4
	歩								5
							飛		6
歩	歩	歩	歩	歩	歩	歩		歩	7
	角	金							8
香	桂	銀		玉	金	銀	桂	香	9

☗ pieces in hand: 歩

6. ...72 or 6. ...62. White has two options regarding their right silver: it could advance either to the seventh file or the sixth file. The seventh file (S-72) option is more common and has become the standard move in Double Wing Attack while the sixth file option is an older move according to professional player Kiyokazu Katsumata (勝又清和).

6. ...72. Moving the silver up to the seventh file allows White the following possibilities:

(i) to play a faster Climbing Silver advancing directly through the eighth file
(ii) to keep an opening for the king to escape (if necessary) through a K-62 – K-72 path
(iii) allows the silver to protect the 83 square from Black's pawn drop on 83 or dangling pawn drop on 84 should White's rook move off of the eighth file
(iv) prevent Black's rook from capturing the silver (if moved instead to 6. ...62) in a Tsukada Special type of attack

However, this gives up defending 53 with the silver and moving to the central file via that square.

6. ...62. Moving the silver to the sixth file allows White the following possibilities:

(i) to immediately protect the pawn resting on 53
(ii) to eventually move their silver to the 53 square

However, the silver on 62 and the gold on 61 may form a wall blocking the king from escaping toward the right side of White's board if under attack. White can still attempt a Climbing Silver strategy although it will be a slower Oblique Climbing Silver strategy since White must move a pawn out of the way first.

Both moves allow for a Reclining Silver positioning of the silver on 54.

Floating Rook
up move 14
☖ pieces in hand: –

9	8	7	6	5	4	3	2	1
香	桂		金	王		銀	桂	香	1
	飛	銀				金	角		2
歩		歩	歩	歩	歩	歩	歩		3
								歩	4
	歩								5
							飛	歩	6
歩	歩	歩	歩	歩	歩	歩			7
	角	金							8
香	桂	銀		玉	金	銀	桂	香	9

☗ pieces in hand: 歩
7. P-16 P-14
Floating Rook
move 16
☖ pieces in hand: –

9	8	7	6	5	4	3	2	1
香	桂		金	王		銀	桂	香	1
	飛	銀				金	角		2
歩		歩		歩	歩	歩	歩		3
			歩					歩	4
	歩								5
							飛	歩	6
歩	歩	歩	歩	歩	歩	歩			7
	角	金				銀			8
香	桂	銀		玉	金		桂	香	9

☗ pieces in hand: 歩
8. S-38 P-64

Floating Rook
move 17
☖ pieces in hand: –

9	8	7	6	5	4	3	2	1
香	桂		金	王		銀	桂	香	1
	飛	銀				金	角		2
歩		歩		歩	歩	歩	歩		3
			歩					歩	4
	歩								5
		歩					飛	歩	6
歩	歩		歩	歩	歩	歩			7
	角	金				銀			8
香	桂	銀		玉	金		桂	香	9

☗ pieces in hand: 歩
9. P-76
Floating Rook
move 18
☖ pieces in hand: –

9	8	7	6	5	4	3	2	1
香	桂		金	王		銀	桂	香	1
	飛	銀				金	角		2
歩		歩		歩	歩	歩	歩		3
			歩					歩	4
									5
	歩	歩					飛	歩	6
歩	歩		歩	歩	歩	歩			7
	角	金				銀			8
香	桂	銀		玉	金		桂	香	9

☗ pieces in hand: 歩
9. ...P-86

Floating Rook
move 20
☖ pieces in hand: 歩

9	8	7	6	5	4	3	2	1
香	桂		金	王		銀	桂	香	1
		銀				金	角		2
歩		歩		歩	歩	歩	歩		3
			歩					歩	4
									5
	飛	歩					飛	歩	6
歩			歩	歩	歩	歩			7
	角	金				銀			8
香	桂	銀		玉	金		桂	香	9

☗ pieces in hand: 歩歩
10. Px86 Rx86
Floating Rook
move 22
☖ pieces in hand: 歩

9	8	7	6	5	4	3	2	1
香	桂		金	王		銀	桂	香	1
		銀				金	角		2
歩		歩		歩	歩	歩	歩		3
	飛		歩					歩	4
									5
		歩					飛	歩	6
歩	歩		歩	歩	歩	歩			7
	角	金				銀			8
香	桂	銀		玉	金		桂	香	9

☗ pieces in hand: 歩
11. P*87 R-84

After move 22, Floating Rook Double Wing Attack branches off into several different substrategies, which are detailed below.

=== Sickle and Chain Silver ===
Sickle and Chain Silver or Chained Sickle Silver (鎖鎌銀 or くさり鎌銀 kusari gama gin)

=== Reclining Silver ===
Reclining Silver
until move 23
☖ pieces in hand: 歩

9	8	7	6	5	4	3	2	1
香	桂		金	王		銀	桂	香	1
		銀				金	角		2
歩		歩		歩	歩	歩	歩		3
	飛		歩					歩	4
									5
		歩			歩		飛	歩	6
歩	歩		歩	歩		歩			7
	角	金				銀			8
香	桂	銀		玉	金		桂	香	9

☗ pieces in hand: 歩
12. P-46

Reclining Silver
until move 25
☖ pieces in hand: 歩

9	8	7	6	5	4	3	2	1
香	桂		金	王		銀	桂	香	1
						金	角		2
歩		歩	銀	歩	歩	歩	歩		3
	飛		歩					歩	4
									5
		歩			歩		飛	歩	6
歩	歩		歩	歩	銀	歩			7
	角	金							8
香	桂	銀		玉	金		桂	香	9

☗ pieces in hand: 歩
12. ...S-63
13. S-47

In order to play (Double or Mutual) Reclining Silver or Sitting Silver, Black must advance their right silver to the 56 square through 47 while White advances their silver to 54 through 63.

Since a pawn is blocking the path of the silver, it must be pushed forward first. White usually makes this pawn push (on the sixth file) earlier than Black's pawn push on the fourth file.

Reclining Silver
until move 26
☖ pieces in hand: 歩

9	8	7	6	5	4	3	2	1
香	桂		金	王		銀	桂	香	1
						金	角		2
歩		歩	銀	歩	歩		歩		3
	飛		歩			歩		歩	4
									5
		歩			歩		飛	歩	6
歩	歩		歩	歩	銀	歩			7
	角	金							8
香	桂	銀		玉	金		桂	香	9

☗ pieces in hand: 歩
13. ...P-34
Reclining Silver
until move 28
☖ pieces in hand: 歩

9	8	7	6	5	4	3	2	1
香	桂		金	王		銀	桂	香	1
						金	角		2
歩		歩		歩	歩		歩		3
	飛		歩	銀		歩		歩	4
									5
		歩		銀	歩		飛	歩	6
歩	歩		歩	歩		歩			7
	角	金							8
香	桂	銀		玉	金		桂	香	9

☗ pieces in hand: 歩
14. S-56 S-54

13. ...P-34. White activates their bishop by opening the bishop diagonal. It's possible that opening the diagonal could have been done sooner before moving the silvers and edge pawns.

==== Clanging Silvers ====
Clanging Silvers (ガッチャン銀 gatchan gin)

=== Nakahara Floating Rook ===
Nakahara
until move 23
☖ pieces in hand: 歩

9	8	7	6	5	4	3	2	1
香	桂		金	王		銀	桂	香	1
		銀				金	角		2
歩		歩		歩	歩	歩	歩		3
	飛		歩					歩	4
									5
		歩				歩	飛	歩	6
歩	歩		歩	歩	歩				7
	角	金				銀			8
香	桂	銀		玉	金		桂	香	9

☗ pieces in hand: 歩
12. P-36
Nakahara
until move 24
☖ pieces in hand: 歩

9	8	7	6	5	4	3	2	1
香	桂		金	王		銀	桂	香	1
		銀				金	角		2
歩		歩		歩	歩		歩		3
	飛		歩			歩		歩	4
									5
		歩				歩	飛	歩	6
歩	歩		歩	歩	歩				7
	角	金				銀			8
香	桂	銀		玉	金		桂	香	9

☗ pieces in hand: 歩
12. ...P-34

Nakahara Double Wing Attack (中原流相掛かり nakahara-ryū aigakari) is a Floating Rook variant has Black advancing the third file pawn.

This allows a space on the 37 square for either the silver or the knight to move to.

White responds by activating their bishop.

These strategies are named after Makoto Nakahara.

==== Nakahara Silver-37 ====
Nakahara Silver-37
until move 25
☖ pieces in hand: 歩

9	8	7	6	5	4	3	2	1
香	桂		金	王		銀	桂	香	1
		銀				金	角		2
歩		歩		歩	歩		歩		3
	飛		歩			歩		歩	4
									5
		歩				歩	飛	歩	6
歩	歩		歩	歩	歩	銀			7
	角	金							8
香	桂	銀		玉	金		桂	香	9

☗ pieces in hand: 歩
13. S-37
Nakahara Silver-37
until move 26
☖ pieces in hand: 歩

9	8	7	6	5	4	3	2	1
香	桂		金	王		銀	桂	香	1
						金	角		2
歩		歩	銀	歩	歩		歩		3
	飛		歩			歩		歩	4
									5
		歩				歩	飛	歩	6
歩	歩		歩	歩	歩	銀			7
	角	金							8
香	桂	銀		玉	金		桂	香	9

☗ pieces in hand: 歩
13. ...S-63

Nakahara Silver-37
until move 27
☖ pieces in hand: 歩

9	8	7	6	5	4	3	2	1
香	桂		金	王		銀	桂	香	1
						金	角		2
歩		歩	銀	歩	歩		歩		3
	飛		歩			歩		歩	4
						歩			5
		歩					飛	歩	6
歩	歩		歩	歩	歩	銀			7
	角	金							8
香	桂	銀		玉	金		桂	香	9

☗ pieces in hand: 歩
14. P-35

Nakahara Silver-37
until move 29
☖ pieces in hand: 歩歩

9	8	7	6	5	4	3	2	1
香	桂		金	王		銀	桂	香	1
						金	角		2
歩		歩	銀	歩	歩		歩		3
	飛		歩					歩	4
						歩			5
		歩			銀		飛	歩	6
歩	歩		歩	歩	歩				7
	角	金							8
香	桂	銀		玉	金		桂	香	9

☗ pieces in hand: 歩
14. ...Px35
15. S-46

Nakahara Silver-37
until move 30
☖ pieces in hand: 歩歩

9	8	7	6	5	4	3	2	1
香	桂			王		銀	桂	香	1
				金		金	角		2
歩		歩	銀	歩	歩		歩		3
	飛		歩					歩	4
						歩			5
		歩			銀		飛	歩	6
歩	歩		歩	歩	歩				7
	角	金							8
香	桂	銀		玉	金		桂	香	9

☗ pieces in hand: 歩
15. ...G-52

Nakahara's silver variant starts with a silver advanced on the third file.

White likewise advances their silver.

Black then aims for an attack on the third file.

==== Nakahara Knight-37 ====
Nakahara Knight-37
until move 25
☖ pieces in hand: 歩

9	8	7	6	5	4	3	2	1
香	桂		金	王		銀	桂	香	1
		銀				金	角		2
歩		歩		歩	歩		歩		3
	飛		歩			歩		歩	4
									5
		歩				歩	飛	歩	6
歩	歩		歩	歩	歩	桂			7
	角	金				銀			8
香	桂	銀		玉	金			香	9

☗ pieces in hand: 歩
13. N-37
Nakahara Knight-37
until move 26
☖ pieces in hand: 歩

9	8	7	6	5	4	3	2	1
香	桂		金			銀	桂	香	1
		銀			王	金	角		2
歩		歩		歩	歩		歩		3
	飛		歩			歩		歩	4
									5
		歩				歩	飛	歩	6
歩	歩		歩	歩	歩	桂			7
	角	金							8
香	桂	銀		玉	金			香	9

☗ pieces in hand: 歩
13. ...K-42

In Nakahara's knight variant, the knight is moved to 37 instead of the silver.

=== Tsukada Special ===
Tsukada Special
☖ pieces in hand: 歩

9	8	7	6	5	4	3	2	1
香	桂		金	王		銀	桂	香	1
		銀				金	角		2
歩		歩		歩	歩	歩	歩		3
			歩				歩	歩	4
									5
	飛	歩					飛	歩	6
歩			歩	歩	歩	歩			7
	角	金				銀			8
香	桂	銀		玉	金		桂	香	9

☗ pieces in hand: 歩

Tsukada Special (塚田スペシャル) is a Floating Rook variant of the Double Wing Attack opening developed by professional Yasuaki Tsukada.

=== Rook on Pawn ===
Rook on Pawn
until move 15
☖ pieces in hand: –

9	8	7	6	5	4	3	2	1
香	桂	銀	金	王		銀	桂	香	1
	飛					金	角		2
歩		歩	歩	歩	歩		歩		3
						歩		歩	4
	歩								5
歩						飛			6
	歩	歩	歩	歩	歩	歩		歩	7
	角	金							8
香	桂	銀		玉	金	銀	桂	香	9

☗ pieces in hand: 歩
8. R-36
Cat's Rook on Pawn
until move 15
☖ pieces in hand: –

9	8	7	6	5	4	3	2	1
香	桂		金	王		銀	桂	香	1
	飛	銀				金	角		2
歩		歩	歩	歩	歩	歩	歩		3
								歩	4
	歩								5
歩						飛			6
	歩	歩	歩	歩	歩	歩		歩	7
	角	金							8
香	桂	銀		玉	金	銀	桂	香	9

☗ pieces in hand: 歩
8. R-36

Rook on Pawn (タテ歩取り or 縦歩取り tatefudori) is a subclass of Floating Rook openings in which the Floating Rook player moves their rook to the third file aiming to capture their opponent's pawn used to open their bishop diagonal at the 34 square.

== See also ==
- Double Wing Attack
- Double Wing Retreating Rook
- Tsukada Special
- Static Rook

== Bibliography ==
- Aono, Teruichi (2009) [1983]. Better moves for better shogi. Translated by Fairbairn, John (2nd ed.). Ishi Press. ISBN 978-4-87187-999-6.
- Aono, Teruichi (1983). Guide to shogi openings: Unlock the secrets of joseki 将棋定跡のカギ: 和英 定跡問題集. Translated by Fairbairn, John. 山海堂. ISBN 4-381-00598-8.
- Fairbairn, John (1986). Shogi for beginners (2nd ed.). Ishi Press. ISBN 978-4-8718-720-10.
- Hosking, Tony (1996). The art of shogi. The Shogi Foundation. ISBN 978-0-95310-890-9.
- Kitao, Madoka (2011). Joseki at a glance. Translated by Kawasaki, Tomohide. Nekomado. ISBN 978-4-9052-2501-0.
- "kieta senpō no nazo" 消えた戦法の謎 [Quest of the lost systems]. Shogi.Net. Mainichi Communications Co. 1995. · Partial translation of 消えた戦法の謎 kieta senpō no nazo by Kiyokazu Katsumata.
