= Nana Yorimoto =

Japanese professional shogi player

- Native name: 頼本奈菜
- Born: March 12, 1997 (age 28)
- Hometown: Meguro, Tokyo

Career
- Achieved professional status: February 1, 2017 (aged 19)
- Badge Number: W-58
- Rank: Women's 2-dan
- Teacher: Hiroki Iizuka (7-dan)

Websites
- JSA profile page

Nana Yorimoto (頼本 奈菜, Yorimoto Nana; born March 12, 1997) is a Japanese women's professional shogi player ranked 2-dan. She honed her skills under the mentorship of shogi professional Hiroki Iizuka.

== Women's shogi professional ==
=== Promotion history ===
Yorimoto's promotion history is as follows:

- 2-kyū: February 1, 2017
- 1-kyū: March 15, 2017
- 1-dan: April 1, 2019
- 2-dan: May 8, 2025

Note: All ranks are women's professional ranks.
