= Climbing Gold =

Shogi strategy

Climbing Gold
☖ pieces in hand: –

9	8	7	6	5	4	3	2	1
香	桂	銀	金	王	金	銀	桂	香	1
						飛	角		2
歩	歩	歩	歩	歩			歩	歩	3
					歩				4
						歩			5
		歩					歩		6
歩	歩		歩	歩	歩	歩	金	歩	7
	角				銀		飛		8
香	桂	銀	金	玉			桂	香	9

☗ pieces in hand: –

In shogi, Climbing Gold (棒金 bōkin) is a strategy used in different openings in which the Static Rook player advances their right gold up the second file if played by Black or the eighth file if played by White supported by the player's rook.

For example, the Climbing Gold may be a useful strategy to counteract an opponent's Ishida formation.

== See also ==
- Climbing Silver
- Ishida (shogi)
- Static Rook

== Bibliography ==
- 勝又清和、2003、『消えた戦法の謎』文庫版、 毎日コミュニケーションズ ISBN 4-8399-1091-X 1995年のものの加筆・文庫版
- Hosking, Tony (1996). The art of shogi. The Shogi Foundation. ISBN 978-0-95310-890-9.
- Kitao, Madoka (2013). Sabaki at a glance. Translated by Kawasaki, Tomohide. Nekomado. ISBN 978-4-9052-2510-2.
