= Climbing Silver =

Shogi strategy

Climbing Silver
☖ pieces in hand: –

9	8	7	6	5	4	3	2	1
									1
									2
									3
									4
							歩		5
		歩					銀	歩	6
歩	歩		歩	歩	歩	歩			7
	角	金	銀	金			飛		8
香	桂		玉				桂	香	9

☗ pieces in hand: –

Climbing Silver (棒銀 bōgin, literally "pole-silver") is a shogi strategy.

Climbing Silver involves advancing a silver upward along with an advanced or dropped pawn supported by the rook aiming to break through the opponent's camp on their bishop's side.

Many different Static Rook shogi openings include a Climbing Silver component. For instance, Climbing Silver can be played as part of Double Wing Attack, Fortress, or Bishop Exchange openings. (However, there are other variants of these openings that don't include Climbing Silver.) Climbing Silver can also be used against Ranging Rook opponents as well.

Diagonal Climbing Silver or Oblique Climbing Silver (斜め棒銀 naname bōgin) is a Climbing Silver attack involving the left silver which moves diagonally from its starting position on 7i to attack on the third or second files. This type of Climbing Silver is typical in Static Rook vs Ranging Rook games.

== Positioning ==
Silver's starting position
☖ pieces in hand: –

9	8	7	6	5	4	3	2	1
					金	銀	桂	香	1
							角		2
					歩	歩	歩	歩	3
									4
							歩		5
									6
					歩	歩		歩	7
							飛		8
						銀	桂	香	9

☗ pieces in hand: –
START

Silver to rank 5 (35)
☖ pieces in hand: –

9	8	7	6	5	4	3	2	1
					金	銀	桂	香	1
							角		2
					歩	歩	歩	歩	3
									4
						銀	歩		5
									6
					歩	歩		歩	7
							飛		8
							桂	香	9

☗ pieces in hand: –
i. S-38

ii. S-27
iii. S-26

iv. S-35
Silver to rank 5 (15)
☖ pieces in hand: –

9	8	7	6	5	4	3	2	1
					金	銀	桂	香	1
							角		2
					歩	歩	歩	歩	3
									4
							歩	銀	5
									6
					歩	歩		歩	7
							飛		8
							桂	香	9

☗ pieces in hand: –
i. S-38

ii. S-27
iii. S-26

iv. S-15

In the adjacent diagrams, the Black's silver advances to rank 5.

Pawn attack on
bishop's pawn (23)
☖ pieces in hand: –

9	8	7	6	5	4	3	2	1
					金	銀	桂	香	1
							角		2
					歩	歩	歩	歩	3
							歩		4
								銀	5
									6
					歩	歩		歩	7
							飛		8
							桂	香	9

☗ pieces in hand: –
i. S-38 ...

ii. S-27 ...
iii. S-26 ...
iv. S-15 ...
v. P-25 ...

Pawn exchange,
Silver advance to 24
☖ pieces in hand: –

9	8	7	6	5	4	3	2	1
					金	銀	桂	香	1
							角		2
					歩	歩		歩	3
							銀		4
									5
									6
					歩	歩		歩	7
							飛		8
							桂	香	9

☗ pieces in hand: 歩
i. S-38 ...

ii. S-27 ...
iii. S-26 ...
iv. S-15 ...
v. P-24 Px24

vi. Sx24 ...

Once the silver has reached the e file (S-15 in the adjacent diagram), Black can attempt to attack White's bishop pawn at 23 by advancing their pawn (P-24). White can capture Black's pawn, but the silver can recapture White's pawn. Because White did not properly defend their bishop's head here, White's camp is somewhat weaker and more susceptible to subsequent attacks from Black.

Silver to 25
☖ pieces in hand: –

9	8	7	6	5	4	3	2	1
					金	銀	桂	香	1
							角		2
					歩	歩	歩	歩	3
									4
							銀		5
									6
					歩	歩		歩	7
							飛		8
							桂	香	9

☗ pieces in hand: 歩
i. S-38

ii. S-27
iii. S-26

iv. S-25
24 pawn drop
☖ pieces in hand: –

9	8	7	6	5	4	3	2	1
					金	銀	桂	香	1
							角		2
					歩	歩	歩	歩	3
							歩		4
							銀		5
									6
					歩	歩		歩	7
							飛		8
							桂	香	9

☗ pieces in hand: –
i. S-38

ii. S-27
iii. S-26
iv. S-25

v. P*24

Similarly, it's also possible to play Climbing Silver when Black has no pawn on the second file. Here the silver can climb to the empty 25 square. And, if there's a pawn in hand, then that pawn can be dropped to 24.

Climbing Silver
☖ pieces in hand: 歩

9	8	7	6	5	4	3	2	1
香	桂				王		桂	香	1
	飛		銀			金	角		2
歩			歩		金	銀	歩		3
		歩		歩	歩	歩			4
	歩						歩	銀	5
		歩		歩					6
歩	歩	銀	歩		歩	歩			7
		金		金			飛		8
香	桂	角	玉				桂	香	9

☗ pieces in hand: 歩

In the board diagram to the right, the Black's silver has successfully climbed to rank 5 on the first file (15).

Climbing Silver, continued
☖ pieces in hand: 銀

9	8	7	6	5	4	3	2	1
香	桂				王		桂		1
	飛		銀			金	角	歩	2
歩			歩		金	銀	歩	歩	3
		歩		歩	歩	歩			4
	歩						歩	香	5
		歩		歩					6
歩	歩	銀	歩		歩	歩			7
		金		金			飛		8
香	桂	角	玉				桂		9

☗ pieces in hand: 香
i. ... Lx15

ii. Lx15 P*13

iii. P*12 ...

A subsequent attack by Black, for example, could aim to sacrifice this silver in order to remove White's lance and then drop a dangling pawn within White's camp that threatens to promote.

Climbing Silver formations may be used with several different Static Rook openings such as Fortress, Double Wing, and Bishop Exchange as well as Ranging Rook openings such as Fourth File Rook.

== See also ==
- Climbing Gold
- Bishop Exchange Climbing Silver
- Double Wing Attack
- Bishop Exchange, Rushing Silver
- Reclining Silver
- Shogi opening
- Shogi strategy

== Bibliography ==
- Aono, Teruichi (2009) [1983]. Better moves for better shogi. Translated by Fairbairn, John (2nd ed.). Ishi Press. ISBN 978-4-87187-999-6.
- Aono, Teruichi (1983). Guide to shogi openings: Unlock the secrets of joseki 将棋定跡のカギ: 和英 定跡問題集. Translated by Fairbairn, John. 山海堂. ISBN 4-381-00598-8.
- 青野 [Aono], 照市 [Teruichi] (2001). 最新棒銀戦法. 創元社.
- Fairbairn, John (1986). Shogi for beginners (2nd ed.). Ishi Press. ISBN 978-4-8718-720-10.
- Hosking, Tony (1996). The art of shogi. The Shogi Foundation. ISBN 978-0-95310-890-9.
- 飯塚 [Iizuka], 祐紀 [Hiroki] (2008). 最強棒銀戦法. 創元社.
- Kitao, Madoka (2011). Joseki at a glance. Translated by Kawasaki, Tomohide. Nekomado. ISBN 978-4-9052-2501-0.
- Kitao, Madoka (2011). Joseki at a glance. Translated by Kawasaki, Tomohide. Nekomado. ISBN 978-4-9052-2501-0.
- Kitao, Madoka (2013). Sabaki at a glance. Translated by Kawasaki, Tomohide. Nekomado. ISBN 978-4-9052-2510-2.
