= Hiroki Iizuka =

Japanese shogi player (born 1969)

- Native name: 飯塚祐紀
- Born: April 2, 1969 (age 57)
- Hometown: Tokyo Metropolis

Career
- Achieved professional status: April 1, 1992 (aged 22)
- Badge number: 203
- Rank: 8-dan
- Teacher: Tsutomu Matsushita (9-dan)
- Meijin class: C1
- Ryūō class: 4
- Notable students: Rintarō Iwamura; Shiryū Katayama; Nana Yorimoto

Websites
- JSA profile page

Hiroki Iizuka (飯塚 祐紀, Iizuka Hiroki; born April 2, 1969) is a Japanese professional shogi player ranked 8-dan.

== Early life and apprenticeship ==
Hiroki Iizuka was born in Tokyo on April 2, 1969. He entered the Japan Shogi Association's apprentice school under the guidance of shogi professional Tsutomu Matsushita in December 1982 at the rank of 6-kyū. He was promoted to 1-dan in 1988, and then obtained full professional status and the rank of 4-dan in April 1992.

== Shogi professional ==
=== Promotion history ===
The promotion history for Iizuka is as follows:

- 6-kyū: 1982
- 1-dan: 1988
- 4-dan: April 1, 1992
- 5-dan: August 5, 1996
- 6-dan: August 13, 2001
- 7-dan: October 27, 2009
- 8-dan: June 7, 2023
