= Reclining Silver =

In shogi, a piece formation used in different Double Static Rook openings

Reclining Silver configuration
☖ pieces in hand: –

9	8	7	6	5	4	3	2	1
									1
									2
									3
									4
									5
				銀	歩				6
			歩	歩					7
									8
									9

☗ pieces in hand: –

In shogi, Reclining Silver (腰掛け銀 koshikakegin) is a piece formation used in different Double Static Rook openings. It may also be played in Double Ranging Rook openings as well and in Right Fourth File Rook (Static Rook) positions against Ranging Rook positions.

Double Reclining Silver
up to move 24
☖ pieces in hand: 歩

9	8	7	6	5	4	3	2	1
香	桂					銀	桂	香	1
			金		王	金	角		2
歩		歩		歩	歩		歩	歩	3
	飛		歩	銀		歩			4
									5
		歩		銀	歩		飛		6
歩	歩		歩	歩		歩		歩	7
	角	金	玉	金					8
香	桂	銀					桂	香	9

☗ pieces in hand: 歩
This Double Reclining Silver position is situated within a Double Wing Attack opening.

The Reclining Silver has the right silver positioned on central file above the central pawn and to the right of the silver is the pawn that was advancing in order to let the silver move through the line of pawns. The silver is said to recline on the seat of pawns.

In the adjacent board diagram, both Black and White have created Reclining Silver positions. Black has their silver on 56 (with pawns on 46 and 57) while White has their silver on 54 (pawns on 53, 64).

Reclining Silver can often be played as a component of several different Static Rook openings such as Double Wing or Bishop Exchange.

== Clanging Silvers ==
Clanging Silvers (ガッチャン銀 gatchan gin) is an attacking development from a Double Reclining Silver position.

In this case, a player advances their silver that is in the Reclining Silver formation such that it attacks their opponent's reclined silver and offers a silver trade.

== See also ==
- Bishop Exchange Reclining Silver
- Double Wing Attack Floating Rook § Reclining Silver
- Static Rook

== Bibliography ==
- Aono, Teruichi (1983). Guide to shogi openings: Unlock the secrets of joseki 将棋定跡のカギ: 和英 定跡問題集. Translated by Fairbairn, John. 山海堂. ISBN 4-381-00598-8.
- Fairbairn, John (1986). Shogi for beginners (2nd ed.). Ishi Press. ISBN 978-4-8718-720-10.
- Hosking, Tony (1996). The art of shogi. The Shogi Foundation. ISBN 978-0-95310-890-9.
- Kitao, Madoka (2011). Joseki at a glance. Translated by Kawasaki, Tomohide. Nekomado. ISBN 978-4-9052-2501-0.
