= Double Wing Attack =

Offensive Strategy in shogi

Double Wing Attack position
☖ pieces in hand: –

| 9 | 8 | 7 | 6 | 5 | 4 | 3 | 2 | 1 |
| 香 | 桂 | 銀 | 金 | 王 | | 銀 | 桂 | 香 | 1 |
| | 飛 | | | | | 金 | 角 | | 2 |
| 歩 | | 歩 | 歩 | 歩 | 歩 | 歩 | 歩 | 歩 | 3 |
| | | | | | | | | | 4 |
| | 歩 | | | | | | 歩 | | 5 |
| | | | | | | | | | 6 |
| 歩 | 歩 | 歩 | 歩 | 歩 | 歩 | 歩 | | 歩 | 7 |
| | 角 | 金 | | | | | 飛 | | 8 |
| 香 | 桂 | 銀 | | 玉 | 金 | 銀 | 桂 | 香 | 9 |

☗ pieces in hand: –

In shogi, Double Wing Attack or simply Wing Attack or Centre Game (Japanese: 相掛かり or 相懸り, romanized: aigakari, lit. 'Mutual attack') is a Double Static Rook opening in which both sides directly advance their rook pawns forward on the second and eighth files toward their opponent's bishop often with the first several moves on each side being identical or very similar.

Double Wing Attack, which has been played since the Edo period, has been known as a strategy prone to fierce battles due to the lack of a well-developed joseki. However, with the development of computer shogi in the late 2010s including programs such as AlphaZero adopting Double Attack, there has been further progress in the josekis for this opening, which has led to its adoption in most professional title games in 2021 highlighting its importance.

== History and general discussion ==
The Double Wing Attack is one of the most traditional openings dating back to over 250 years ago. Originally, unlike the Yagura (Fortress) openings, in which piece positioning advances by blocking the bishop diagonals, all ways in which the piece positioning proceeds without closing the bishop diagonals received the name aigakari (lit. 'mutual attack'), which has been traditionally translated to English as Double Wing Attack. Later, the strategy of exchanging bishops first and then proceeding with the piece positioning began to be called Bishop exchange (Japanese: Japanese: 角換わり, romanized: kakugawari), while the strategy of capturing the pawn on 34 (i.e. the 'side pawn') after exchanging rooks once both bishop diagonals have been opened began to be called Side pawn capture (Japanese: 横歩取り, romanized: yokofudori), openings that are now considered independent of aigakari.

Open bishop diagonal
☖ pieces in hand: –

| 9 | 8 | 7 | 6 | 5 | 4 | 3 | 2 | 1 |
| 香 | 桂 | 銀 | 金 | 王 | | 銀 | 桂 | 香 | 1 |
| | 飛 | | | | | 金 | 角 | | 2 |
| 歩 | | 歩 | 歩 | 歩 | 歩 | | 歩 | 歩 | 3 |
| | | | | | | 歩 | | | 4 |
| | 歩 | | | | | | 歩 | | 5 |
| | | 歩 | | | | | | | 6 |
| 歩 | 歩 | | 歩 | 歩 | 歩 | 歩 | | 歩 | 7 |
| | 角 | 金 | | | | | 飛 | | 8 |
| 香 | 桂 | 銀 | | 玉 | 金 | 銀 | 桂 | 香 | 9 |

☗ pieces in hand: –
Closed bishop diagonal
☖ pieces in hand: –

| 9 | 8 | 7 | 6 | 5 | 4 | 3 | 2 | 1 |
| 香 | 桂 | 銀 | 金 | 王 | | 銀 | 桂 | 香 | 1 |
| | 飛 | | | | | 金 | 角 | | 2 |
| 歩 | | 歩 | 歩 | 歩 | 歩 | 歩 | 歩 | 歩 | 3 |
| | | | | | | | | | 4 |
| | 歩 | | | | | | 歩 | | 5 |
| | | | | | | | | | 6 |
| 歩 | 歩 | 歩 | 歩 | 歩 | 歩 | 歩 | | 歩 | 7 |
| | 角 | 金 | | | | | 飛 | | 8 |
| 香 | 桂 | 銀 | | 玉 | 金 | 銀 | 桂 | 香 | 9 |

☗ pieces in hand: –

Double Wing openings have two general variations. The first one has both bishop diagonals open (that is, P-76 and P-34) while the second type has bishop diagonals closed. The open bishop diagonal variations were most common historically being played from the 1700s and throughout the first part of the twentieth century.

However, in modern shogi, the term Aigakari typically refers to the closed bishop diagonal variations. One reason is that the open bishop diagonal position shown in the adjacent diagram most often develops into a Side Pawn Capture opening (where the pawn on 34 or 76 are captured by a rook) instead an open bishop diagonal variation of Double Wing. This a major change from past centuries where Side Pawn Capture openings were uncommon as they were considered to be inferior strategies. In the second half of the 20th century, Side Pawn Capture was recognized as a sound opening – eventually becoming one of the most popular Double Static Rook opening among professional players in the 21st century. Thus, a present-day Double Wing opening typically arises when the rook pawns are traded off the board first and only after this are the bishop diagonals opened (if they are opened at all), which prevents the Side Pawn Capture opening possibility. Consequently, the open bishop diagonal variations of Double Wing (without captured side pawns) are not commonly played by professional players (although they are occasionally seen).

During the Edo period (1603-1868) the common joseki for Double Wing Attack consisted of advancing the rook pawn after opening the bishop diagonals, and after exchanging pawns, retreating the rook without capturing the side pawn. At the beginning of the Heisei era (1989-2019), the main line became to advance the rook pawns without opening any of the bishop diagonals, and then to retreat the rook after exchanging the pawns. However, starting in the second half of the 2010s, it became more frequent to delay the rook pawns exchange, without doing so immediately.

Traditionally, the two most common positions to which the rook retreated have been R-26 and R-28 (in Black's case), but in recent years, the R-25 variation of Double Attack has also appeared in official tournaments. From this point on, several variants are possible, such as Twisting Rook on the left of the board (in the case of Black's R-26 variation), or Climbing Silver or Reclining Silver using the right silver, which require both players to manage a wide range of moves and imagination. There is a wide variety of strategies, from quick attacks in which both players make use of their pawns in hand, to slow games in which both players castle their kings.

== Closed bishop diagonal variation ==
Double Wing Attack
position after 4 moves
☖ pieces in hand: –

| 9 | 8 | 7 | 6 | 5 | 4 | 3 | 2 | 1 |
| 香 | 桂 | 銀 | 金 | 王 | 金 | 銀 | 桂 | 香 | 1 |
| | 飛 | | | | | | 角 | | 2 |
| 歩 | | 歩 | 歩 | 歩 | 歩 | 歩 | 歩 | 歩 | 3 |
| | | | | | | | | | 4 |
| | 歩 | | | | | | 歩 | | 5 |
| | | | | | | | | | 6 |
| 歩 | 歩 | 歩 | 歩 | 歩 | 歩 | 歩 | | 歩 | 7 |
| | 角 | | | | | | 飛 | | 8 |
| 香 | 桂 | 銀 | 金 | 玉 | 金 | 銀 | 桂 | 香 | 9 |

☗ pieces in hand: –
1. P-26 P-84
2. P-25 P-85
Double Wing Attack
position after 6 moves
☖ pieces in hand: –

| 9 | 8 | 7 | 6 | 5 | 4 | 3 | 2 | 1 |
| 香 | 桂 | 銀 | 金 | 王 | | 銀 | 桂 | 香 | 1 |
| | 飛 | | | | | 金 | 角 | | 2 |
| 歩 | | 歩 | 歩 | 歩 | 歩 | 歩 | 歩 | 歩 | 3 |
| | | | | | | | | | 4 |
| | 歩 | | | | | | 歩 | | 5 |
| | | | | | | | | | 6 |
| 歩 | 歩 | 歩 | 歩 | 歩 | 歩 | 歩 | | 歩 | 7 |
| | 角 | 金 | | | | | 飛 | | 8 |
| 香 | 桂 | 銀 | | 玉 | 金 | 銀 | 桂 | 香 | 9 |

☗ pieces in hand: –
3. G-78 G-32

The initial aim of the Double Wing Attack to threaten each opponent's bishop and to exchange the rook pawns activating the rook.

From the start of the game, the pawn at the head of each bishop (23 for White, 87 for Black) is undefended. By advancing each player's rook pawn (at 83 for White, at 27 for Black), each player aims for their opponent's bishop head. Then, the initial strategy involved is to provide the head of the bishop with adequate defense and/or give the bishop an escape route from the advancing pawn.

1. P-26 P-84, 2. P-25 P-85. Following the joseki, both sides advance their rook pawns to the middle rank 5.

3. G-78 G-32. Then, golds are moved to defend each bishop's head.

Note that the head of the bishop should be defended. (See: § Protecting the bishops below.)

An alternative option is to advance the side or edge pawn allowing the bishop to escape, which leads to a different set of josekis.

Another alternative is for Black to play a Floating Rook strategy and prevent White from making a pawn exchange, although Black's Rook becomes somewhat exposed.

Double Wing Attack
position after 7 moves
☖ pieces in hand: –

| 9 | 8 | 7 | 6 | 5 | 4 | 3 | 2 | 1 |
| 香 | 桂 | 銀 | 金 | 王 | | 銀 | 桂 | 香 | 1 |
| | 飛 | | | | | 金 | 角 | | 2 |
| 歩 | | 歩 | 歩 | 歩 | 歩 | 歩 | 歩 | 歩 | 3 |
| | | | | | | | 歩 | | 4 |
| | 歩 | | | | | | | | 5 |
| | | | | | | | | | 6 |
| 歩 | 歩 | 歩 | 歩 | 歩 | 歩 | 歩 | | 歩 | 7 |
| | 角 | 金 | | | | | 飛 | | 8 |
| 香 | 桂 | 銀 | | 玉 | 金 | 銀 | 桂 | 香 | 9 |

☗ pieces in hand: –
4. P-2d

Double Wing Attack
position after 10 moves
☖ pieces in hand: –

| 9 | 8 | 7 | 6 | 5 | 4 | 3 | 2 | 1 |
| 香 | 桂 | 銀 | 金 | 王 | | 銀 | 桂 | 香 | 1 |
| | 飛 | | | | | 金 | 角 | | 2 |
| 歩 | | 歩 | 歩 | 歩 | 歩 | 歩 | 歩 | 歩 | 3 |
| | | | | | | | 飛 | | 4 |
| | 歩 | | | | | | | | 5 |
| | | | | | | | | | 6 |
| 歩 | 歩 | 歩 | 歩 | 歩 | 歩 | 歩 | | 歩 | 7 |
| | 角 | 金 | | | | | | | 8 |
| 香 | 桂 | 銀 | | 玉 | 金 | 銀 | 桂 | 香 | 9 |

☗ pieces in hand: 歩
4. ...Px24
5. Rx24 P*23

4. P-24 Px24, 5. Rx24. Next, Black initiates a pawn attack on the second file leading to a pawn exchange involving the rook.

5. ...P*23. White responds by dropping a pawn to 23 to push Black's rook back.

After move 10 of Double Wing Attack, the joseki branches off into different variants depending on which square the rook moves down to. (See § Further strategy branches below.)

=== Protecting the bishops ===
After advancing the rook pawns in the first four moves (1. P-26 P-84, 2. P-25 P-85), it is important for both players to protect the bishop's head with a gold rather than immediately pushing their rook pawns again. If either player ignores protecting the bishop after move 4 (a blunder), their bishop may get trapped by a pawn drop according to the famous josekis explained below.

(A similar issue occurs in a Bishop Exchange opening where if bishop's head is not protected by a gold, then a pawn drop can occur.)

==== Blunder: Black's failure to defend ====
Black's Pawn Advance
up to move 5
☖ pieces in hand: –

| 9 | 8 | 7 | 6 | 5 | 4 | 3 | 2 | 1 |
| 香 | 桂 | 銀 | 金 | 王 | 金 | 銀 | 桂 | 香 | 1 |
| | 飛 | | | | | | 角 | | 2 |
| 歩 | | 歩 | 歩 | 歩 | 歩 | 歩 | 歩 | 歩 | 3 |
| | | | | | | | 歩 | | 4 |
| | 歩 | | | | | | | | 5 |
| | | | | | | | | | 6 |
| 歩 | 歩 | 歩 | 歩 | 歩 | 歩 | 歩 | | 歩 | 7 |
| | 角 | | | | | | 飛 | | 8 |
| 香 | 桂 | 銀 | 金 | 玉 | 金 | 銀 | 桂 | 香 | 9 |

☗ pieces in hand: –
1. P-26 P-84

2. P-25 P-85

3. P-24?
White's Pawn Advance
up to move 8
☖ pieces in hand: 歩

| 9 | 8 | 7 | 6 | 5 | 4 | 3 | 2 | 1 |
| 香 | 桂 | 銀 | 金 | 王 | 金 | 銀 | 桂 | 香 | 1 |
| | 飛 | | | | | | 角 | | 2 |
| 歩 | | 歩 | 歩 | 歩 | 歩 | 歩 | | 歩 | 3 |
| | | | | | | | 飛 | | 4 |
| | | | | | | | | | 5 |
| | 歩 | | | | | | | | 6 |
| 歩 | 歩 | 歩 | 歩 | 歩 | 歩 | 歩 | | 歩 | 7 |
| | 角 | | | | | | | | 8 |
| 香 | 桂 | 銀 | 金 | 玉 | 金 | 銀 | 桂 | 香 | 9 |

☗ pieces in hand: 歩
3. ...Px24

4. Rx24 P-86

5.P-24. This sequence of moves (1.P-26 P-84 2.P-25 P-85 3.P-24) is known as the 5-Move Bomb (五手爆弾 go-te bakudan).

If Black continues advancing their rook pawn for an attack at 23 instead of defending with a gold as recommended by joseki, after a pawn exchange on the second file involving the rook, White can start a counterattack by advancing their pawn on the eighth file.

Bishop Trap
up to move 10
☖ pieces in hand: –

| 9 | 8 | 7 | 6 | 5 | 4 | 3 | 2 | 1 |
| 香 | 桂 | 銀 | 金 | 王 | 金 | 銀 | 桂 | 香 | 1 |
| | 飛 | | | | | | 角 | | 2 |
| 歩 | | 歩 | 歩 | 歩 | 歩 | 歩 | | 歩 | 3 |
| | | | | | | | 飛 | | 4 |
| | | | | | | | | | 5 |
| | 歩 | | | | | | | | 6 |
| 歩 | 歩 | 歩 | 歩 | 歩 | 歩 | 歩 | | 歩 | 7 |
| | 角 | | | | | | | | 8 |
| 香 | 桂 | 銀 | 金 | 玉 | 金 | 銀 | 桂 | 香 | 9 |

☗ pieces in hand: 歩歩
5. Px86 P*87!
Bishop Trap
up to move 12
☖ pieces in hand: 角

| 9 | 8 | 7 | 6 | 5 | 4 | 3 | 2 | 1 |
| 香 | 桂 | 銀 | 金 | 王 | 金 | 銀 | 桂 | 香 | 1 |
| | 飛 | | | | | | 角 | | 2 |
| 歩 | | 歩 | 歩 | 歩 | 歩 | 歩 | 歩 | 歩 | 3 |
| | | | | | | | 飛 | | 4 |
| | | | | | | | | | 5 |
| | 歩 | | | | | | | | 6 |
| 歩 | | 歩 | 歩 | 歩 | 歩 | 歩 | | 歩 | 7 |
| | と | | | | | | | | 8 |
| 香 | 桂 | 銀 | 金 | 玉 | 金 | 銀 | 桂 | 香 | 9 |

☗ pieces in hand: 歩
6. P*23 Px88

Once Black captures White's pawn at 86, rather than recapturing Black's pawn with their rook (as happens in the recommended joseki), White can instead drop a pawn at the bishop's head (P*87). Black's bishop is now trapped.

Although Black can also attack White's bishop with a pawn drop, White now has the initiative and will capture Black's bishop first.

White's Rook-Pawn Fork
up to move 14
☖ pieces in hand: –

| 9 | 8 | 7 | 6 | 5 | 4 | 3 | 2 | 1 |
| 香 | 桂 | 銀 | 金 | 王 | 金 | 銀 | 桂 | 香 | 1 |
| | 飛 | | | | | | 角 | | 2 |
| 歩 | | 歩 | 歩 | 歩 | 歩 | 歩 | 歩 | 歩 | 3 |
| | | | | | | | 飛 | | 4 |
| | | | | | | 角 | | | 5 |
| | 歩 | | | | | | | | 6 |
| 歩 | | 歩 | 歩 | 歩 | 歩 | 歩 | | 歩 | 7 |
| | 銀 | | | | | | | | 8 |
| 香 | 桂 | | 金 | 玉 | 金 | 銀 | 桂 | 香 | 9 |

☗ pieces in hand: 歩歩
7. Sx88 B*33
White's Bishop Promotion
up to move 16
☖ pieces in hand: 歩

| 9 | 8 | 7 | 6 | 5 | 4 | 3 | 2 | 1 |
| 香 | 桂 | 銀 | 金 | 王 | 金 | 銀 | 桂 | 香 | 1 |
| | 飛 | | | | | | 角 | | 2 |
| 歩 | | 歩 | 歩 | 歩 | 歩 | 歩 | 歩 | 歩 | 3 |
| | | | | | | | | | 4 |
| | | | | | | | | | 5 |
| | 歩 | | | | | | | | 6 |
| 歩 | | 歩 | 歩 | 馬 | 歩 | 歩 | | 歩 | 7 |
| | 銀 | | | | | | 飛 | | 8 |
| 香 | 桂 | | 金 | 玉 | 金 | 銀 | 桂 | 香 | 9 |

☗ pieces in hand: 歩歩
8. R-28 Bx57+

After Black captures White's tokin at 88 with a silver, with a bishop in hand, White can fork Black's rook and king pawn by dropping their bishop to 35. At this point, the choices for Black's rook are to either retreat or attack White's bishop. (Ignoring the bishop attack may lead to losing the rook.) If Black's rook retreats to rank 8 (as shown in the diagram), then White can promote their bishop to a horse at 57.

Bishop capture
up to move 17
☖ pieces in hand: 歩

| 9 | 8 | 7 | 6 | 5 | 4 | 3 | 2 | 1 |
| 香 | 桂 | 銀 | 金 | 王 | 金 | 銀 | 桂 | 香 | 1 |
| | 飛 | | | | | | と | | 2 |
| 歩 | | 歩 | 歩 | 歩 | 歩 | 歩 | | 歩 | 3 |
| | | | | | | | | | 4 |
| | | | | | | | | | 5 |
| | 歩 | | | | | | | | 6 |
| 歩 | | 歩 | 歩 | 馬 | 歩 | 歩 | | 歩 | 7 |
| | 銀 | | | | | | 飛 | | 8 |
| 香 | 桂 | | 金 | 玉 | 金 | 銀 | 桂 | 香 | 9 |

☗ pieces in hand: 角 歩歩
9. Px23+

From here, Black can finally capture White's bishop.

===== Rook capturing tokin variant =====
After move 17, White must remove the threat of Black's tokin on 22.

Aono and Kitao recommend taking the tokin with the rook, which is defended by a silver.

(Hosking suggests a variant in which the silver captures the tokin. See below.)

From here, Black may exchange rooks.

But, White is in a better position.

===== Silver capturing tokin variant =====
Bishop Capture
up to move 17
☖ pieces in hand: 歩

| 9 | 8 | 7 | 6 | 5 | 4 | 3 | 2 | 1 |
| 香 | 桂 | 銀 | 金 | 王 | 金 | 銀 | 桂 | 香 | 1 |
| | 飛 | | | | | | と | | 2 |
| 歩 | | 歩 | 歩 | 歩 | 歩 | 歩 | | 歩 | 3 |
| | | | | | | | | | 4 |
| | | | | | | | | | 5 |
| | 歩 | | | | | | | | 6 |
| 歩 | | 歩 | 歩 | 馬 | 歩 | 歩 | | 歩 | 7 |
| | 銀 | | | | | | 飛 | | 8 |
| 香 | 桂 | | 金 | 玉 | 金 | 銀 | 桂 | 香 | 9 |

☗ pieces in hand: 角 歩歩
9. Px23+

Bishop Drop
up to move 19
☖ pieces in hand: 歩歩

| 9 | 8 | 7 | 6 | 5 | 4 | 3 | 2 | 1 |
| 香 | 桂 | 銀 | 金 | 王 | 金 | | 桂 | 香 | 1 |
| | 飛 | | | | | | 銀 | | 2 |
| 歩 | | 歩 | 歩 | 歩 | 歩 | 歩 | | 歩 | 3 |
| | | | | | | | | | 4 |
| | | | | | 角 | | | | 5 |
| | 歩 | | | | | | | | 6 |
| 歩 | | 歩 | 歩 | 馬 | 歩 | 歩 | | 歩 | 7 |
| | 銀 | | | | | | 飛 | | 8 |
| 香 | 桂 | | 金 | 玉 | 金 | 銀 | 桂 | 香 | 9 |

☗ pieces in hand: 歩歩
9. ...Sx23
10. B*45

Kitao suggests that taking the tokin with White's silver after move 17 is an inferior move. The reason is because Black will drop their bishop to 45 threatening to promote at 63 and further attack White's camp.

Rook Defends
up to move 20
☖ pieces in hand: 歩歩

| 9 | 8 | 7 | 6 | 5 | 4 | 3 | 2 | 1 |
| 香 | 桂 | 銀 | 金 | 王 | 金 | | 桂 | 香 | 1 |
| | | | 飛 | | | | 銀 | | 2 |
| 歩 | | 歩 | 歩 | 歩 | 歩 | 歩 | | 歩 | 3 |
| | | | | | | | | | 4 |
| | | | | | 角 | | | | 5 |
| | 歩 | | | | | | | | 6 |
| 歩 | | 歩 | 歩 | 馬 | 歩 | 歩 | | 歩 | 7 |
| | 銀 | | | | | | 飛 | | 8 |
| 香 | 桂 | | 金 | 玉 | 金 | 銀 | 桂 | 香 | 9 |

☗ pieces in hand: 歩歩
10. ...R-62
Rook Defends
up to move 20
☖ pieces in hand: 歩歩

| 9 | 8 | 7 | 6 | 5 | 4 | 3 | 2 | 1 |
| 香 | 桂 | 銀 | 金 | 王 | 金 | | 桂 | 香 | 1 |
| | | | 飛 | 歩 | | | 銀 | | 2 |
| 歩 | | 歩 | 歩 | 歩 | 歩 | 歩 | | 歩 | 3 |
| | | | | | | | | | 4 |
| | | | | | 角 | | | | 5 |
| | 歩 | | | | | | | | 6 |
| 歩 | | 歩 | 歩 | 馬 | 歩 | 歩 | | 歩 | 7 |
| | 銀 | | | | | | 飛 | | 8 |
| 香 | 桂 | | 金 | 玉 | 金 | 銀 | 桂 | 香 | 9 |

☗ pieces in hand: 歩
11. P*52

At this point, White needs to defend 63. However, a gold can't be used for this purpose because that gold would come between the rook and the silver on rank 2 allowing Black to take the silver for free. Therefore, the suggested move is to use the rook to defend both 63 and 22.

Black now drops a pawn to put the king in check. This move tries to force White's rook to capture the pawn at 52 with White's rook (Rx52), which will allow Black to successfully promote their bishop at 63 and attack White's rook (Bx63).

Kitao considers this position uncertain compared to the position in which the rook captures the tokin.

If White uses a gold to capture the checking pawn (Gx52), then the rook's defense of the silver will be blocked allowing Black to capture the silver (Rx22).

However, Hosking has a different suggestion which Kitao does not consider.

====== Hosking's silver variant ======
Tokin recapture
up to move 18
☖ pieces in hand: 歩歩

| 9 | 8 | 7 | 6 | 5 | 4 | 3 | 2 | 1 |
| 香 | 桂 | 銀 | 金 | 王 | 金 | | 桂 | 香 | 1 |
| | 飛 | | | | | | 銀 | | 2 |
| 歩 | | 歩 | 歩 | 歩 | 歩 | 歩 | | 歩 | 3 |
| | | | | | | | | | 4 |
| | | | | | | | | | 5 |
| | 歩 | | | | | | | | 6 |
| 歩 | | 歩 | 歩 | 馬 | 歩 | 歩 | | 歩 | 7 |
| | 銀 | | | | | | 飛 | | 8 |
| 香 | 桂 | | 金 | 玉 | 金 | 銀 | 桂 | 香 | 9 |

☗ pieces in hand: 角 歩歩
9. ...Sx23
Bishop Drop
up to move 19
☖ pieces in hand: 歩歩

| 9 | 8 | 7 | 6 | 5 | 4 | 3 | 2 | 1 |
| 香 | 桂 | 銀 | 金 | 王 | 金 | | 桂 | 香 | 1 |
| | 飛 | | | | | | 銀 | | 2 |
| 歩 | | 歩 | 歩 | 歩 | 歩 | 歩 | | 歩 | 3 |
| | | | | | | | | | 4 |
| | | | | | 角 | | | | 5 |
| | 歩 | | | | | | | | 6 |
| 歩 | | 歩 | 歩 | 馬 | 歩 | 歩 | | 歩 | 7 |
| | 銀 | | | | | | 飛 | | 8 |
| 香 | 桂 | | 金 | 玉 | 金 | 銀 | 桂 | 香 | 9 |

☗ pieces in hand: 歩歩
10. B*45

In contrast to Aono and Kitao, Hosking recommends the silver taking the tokin along with the defense of this silver as shown below.

If White captures the tokin with the silver, Black can now use their newly obtained bishop in the next move.

Black can drop their bishop to 45 (or 36) attacking 63.

Gold Defends
up to move 20
☖ pieces in hand: 歩歩

| 9 | 8 | 7 | 6 | 5 | 4 | 3 | 2 | 1 |
| 香 | 桂 | 銀 | 金 | 王 | | | 桂 | 香 | 1 |
| | 飛 | | | | | 金 | 銀 | | 2 |
| 歩 | | 歩 | 歩 | 歩 | 歩 | 歩 | | 歩 | 3 |
| | | | | | | | | | 4 |
| | | | | | 角 | | | | 5 |
| | 歩 | | | | | | | | 6 |
| 歩 | | 歩 | 歩 | 馬 | 歩 | 歩 | | 歩 | 7 |
| | 銀 | | | | | | 飛 | | 8 |
| 香 | 桂 | | 金 | 玉 | 金 | 銀 | 桂 | 香 | 9 |

☗ pieces in hand: 歩歩
10. ...G-32
Bishop Promotion
up to move 22
☖ pieces in hand: 歩歩

| 9 | 8 | 7 | 6 | 5 | 4 | 3 | 2 | 1 |
| 香 | 桂 | 銀 | | 王 | | | 桂 | 香 | 1 |
| | 飛 | | | 金 | | 金 | 銀 | | 2 |
| 歩 | | 歩 | 馬 | 歩 | 歩 | 歩 | | 歩 | 3 |
| | | | | | | | | | 4 |
| | | | | | | | | | 5 |
| | 歩 | | | | | | | | 6 |
| 歩 | | 歩 | 歩 | 馬 | 歩 | 歩 | | 歩 | 7 |
| | 銀 | | | | | | 飛 | | 8 |
| 香 | 桂 | | 金 | 玉 | 金 | 銀 | 桂 | 香 | 9 |

☗ pieces in hand: 歩歩歩
11. Bx63+ G-52

If White tries to defend 63 with another piece now, the rook's defense of the silver on 22 will be blocked allowing Black to capture the silver on 22. Thus, Hosking's solution to defend the silver with a gold.

Black's bishop can promote, but White can attack the bishop with a gold now (since the rook is freed up from its defensive role).

Later White may capture more of Black's pawns with either their rook or horse leading to a stronger position for White.

===== Ignoring White's counterattack =====
White's Pawn Advance
up to move 6
☖ pieces in hand: 歩

| 9 | 8 | 7 | 6 | 5 | 4 | 3 | 2 | 1 |
| 香 | 桂 | 銀 | 金 | 王 | 金 | 銀 | 桂 | 香 | 1 |
| | 飛 | | | | | | 角 | | 2 |
| 歩 | | 歩 | 歩 | 歩 | 歩 | 歩 | | 歩 | 3 |
| | | | | | | | 飛 | | 4 |
| | | | | | | | | | 5 |
| | 歩 | | | | | | | | 6 |
| 歩 | 歩 | 歩 | 歩 | 歩 | 歩 | 歩 | | 歩 | 7 |
| | 角 | | | | | | | | 8 |
| 香 | 桂 | 銀 | 金 | 玉 | 金 | 銀 | 桂 | 香 | 9 |

☗ pieces in hand: 歩
START
White's Pawn Drop
up to move 7
☖ pieces in hand: 歩

| 9 | 8 | 7 | 6 | 5 | 4 | 3 | 2 | 1 |
| 香 | 桂 | 銀 | 金 | 王 | 金 | 銀 | 桂 | 香 | 1 |
| | 飛 | | | | | | 角 | | 2 |
| 歩 | | 歩 | 歩 | 歩 | 歩 | 歩 | 歩 | 歩 | 3 |
| | | | | | | | 飛 | | 4 |
| | | | | | | | | | 5 |
| | 歩 | | | | | | | | 6 |
| 歩 | 歩 | 歩 | 歩 | 歩 | 歩 | 歩 | | 歩 | 7 |
| | 角 | | | | | | | | 8 |
| 香 | 桂 | 銀 | 金 | 玉 | 金 | 銀 | 桂 | 香 | 9 |

☗ pieces in hand: –
4. P*23

If Black entertains the possibility of ignoring White completely and continuing their attack by dropping a pawn at 23 to attack White's bishop after move 6, the result stills favors White.

Bishop Capture
up to move 10
☖ pieces in hand: 歩歩歩

| 9 | 8 | 7 | 6 | 5 | 4 | 3 | 2 | 1 |
| 香 | 桂 | 銀 | 金 | 王 | 金 | | 桂 | 香 | 1 |
| | 飛 | | | | | | 銀 | | 2 |
| 歩 | | 歩 | 歩 | 歩 | 歩 | 歩 | | 歩 | 3 |
| | | | | | | | 飛 | | 4 |
| | | | | | | | | | 5 |
| | | | | | | | | | 6 |
| 歩 | と | 歩 | 歩 | 歩 | 歩 | 歩 | | 歩 | 7 |
| | 角 | | | | | | | | 8 |
| 香 | 桂 | 銀 | 金 | 玉 | 金 | 銀 | 桂 | 香 | 9 |

☗ pieces in hand: 角
4. ...Px87+
5. Px22+ Sx22
Rook Defends
up to move 11
☖ pieces in hand: 歩歩歩

| 9 | 8 | 7 | 6 | 5 | 4 | 3 | 2 | 1 |
| 香 | 桂 | 銀 | 金 | 王 | 金 | | 桂 | 香 | 1 |
| | 飛 | | | | | | 銀 | | 2 |
| 歩 | | 歩 | 歩 | 歩 | 歩 | 歩 | | 歩 | 3 |
| | | | | | | | | | 4 |
| | | | | | | | | | 5 |
| | | | | | | | | | 6 |
| 歩 | と | 歩 | 歩 | 歩 | 歩 | 歩 | | 歩 | 7 |
| | 角 | | | | | | 飛 | | 8 |
| 香 | 桂 | 銀 | 金 | 玉 | 金 | 銀 | 桂 | 香 | 9 |

☗ pieces in hand: 角
6. R-28

Both White and Black's pawn can advance and promote, and Black captures the bishop first. White recaptures the tokin with a silver. Since White's silver at 22 is defended by their rook and Black has no more pawns to drop, Black's best move is to defend against White's attack by retreating to rank 8. Otherwise, White will capture both Black's bishop as well as Black's silver and promote their rook at the same time.

Pawn Drop
up to move 12
☖ pieces in hand: 歩歩

| 9 | 8 | 7 | 6 | 5 | 4 | 3 | 2 | 1 |
| 香 | 桂 | 銀 | 金 | 王 | 金 | | 桂 | 香 | 1 |
| | 飛 | | | | | | 銀 | | 2 |
| 歩 | | 歩 | 歩 | 歩 | 歩 | 歩 | | 歩 | 3 |
| | | | | | | | | | 4 |
| | | | | | | | | | 5 |
| | 歩 | | | | | | | | 6 |
| 歩 | と | 歩 | 歩 | 歩 | 歩 | 歩 | | 歩 | 7 |
| | 角 | | | | | | 飛 | | 8 |
| 香 | 桂 | 銀 | 金 | 玉 | 金 | 銀 | 桂 | 香 | 9 |

☗ pieces in hand: 角
6. ...P*86

With Black's rook defending 88, the number of pieces in an exchange is even: White's tokin and rook vs Black's silver and rook. However, White can now drop a dangling pawn on 86 which threatens to promote on 87 attacking Black's silver.

At this point, White will capture Black's bishop and break through their camp in future moves leaving Black in an inferior position. Black cannot save their bishop and will probably lose either their knight or silver when White's dangling pawn promotes. There is also the additional risk of White's rook promoting on the eighth file. Although Black was able to get a bishop, White has Black's bishop and also has more captured pieces.

==== Blunder: White's failure to defend ====
Double Wing Attack
up to move 4
☖ pieces in hand: –

| 9 | 8 | 7 | 6 | 5 | 4 | 3 | 2 | 1 |
| 香 | 桂 | 銀 | 金 | 王 | 金 | 銀 | 桂 | 香 | 1 |
| | 飛 | | | | | | 角 | | 2 |
| 歩 | | 歩 | 歩 | 歩 | 歩 | 歩 | 歩 | 歩 | 3 |
| | | | | | | | | | 4 |
| | 歩 | | | | | | 歩 | | 5 |
| | | | | | | | | | 6 |
| 歩 | 歩 | 歩 | 歩 | 歩 | 歩 | 歩 | | 歩 | 7 |
| | 角 | | | | | | 飛 | | 8 |
| 香 | 桂 | 銀 | 金 | 玉 | 金 | 銀 | 桂 | 香 | 9 |

☗ pieces in hand: –
1. P-26 P-84
2. P-25 P-85
White's Pawn Advance
up to move 6
☖ pieces in hand: –

| 9 | 8 | 7 | 6 | 5 | 4 | 3 | 2 | 1 |
| 香 | 桂 | 銀 | 金 | 王 | 金 | 銀 | 桂 | 香 | 1 |
| | 飛 | | | | | | 角 | | 2 |
| 歩 | | 歩 | 歩 | 歩 | 歩 | 歩 | 歩 | 歩 | 3 |
| | | | | | | | | | 4 |
| | | | | | | | 歩 | | 5 |
| | 歩 | | | | | | | | 6 |
| 歩 | 歩 | 歩 | 歩 | 歩 | 歩 | 歩 | | 歩 | 7 |
| | 角 | 金 | | | | | 飛 | | 8 |
| 香 | 桂 | 銀 | | 玉 | 金 | 銀 | 桂 | 香 | 9 |

☗ pieces in hand: –
3. G-78 P-86?

According to joseki, when both Black and White defend their bishops with a gold, after White exchanges their rook pawn, Black is recommended to drop a pawn to 8g for move 15 (see above).

However, if Black defends their bishop with gold but White does not and instead continues with a premature advance of their rook pawn, joseki recommends a different strategy.

Black's Counterattack
up to move 9
☖ pieces in hand: 歩

| 9 | 8 | 7 | 6 | 5 | 4 | 3 | 2 | 1 |
| 香 | 桂 | 銀 | 金 | 王 | 金 | 銀 | 桂 | 香 | 1 |
| | | | | | | | 角 | | 2 |
| 歩 | | 歩 | 歩 | 歩 | 歩 | 歩 | 歩 | 歩 | 3 |
| | | | | | | | 歩 | | 4 |
| | | | | | | | | | 5 |
| | 飛 | | | | | | | | 6 |
| 歩 | | 歩 | 歩 | 歩 | 歩 | 歩 | | 歩 | 7 |
| | 角 | 金 | | | | | 飛 | | 8 |
| 香 | 桂 | 銀 | | 玉 | 金 | 銀 | 桂 | 香 | 9 |

☗ pieces in hand: 歩
4. Px86 Rx86
5. P-24
Bishop Trap
up to move 10
☖ pieces in hand: 歩歩

| 9 | 8 | 7 | 6 | 5 | 4 | 3 | 2 | 1 |
| 香 | 桂 | 銀 | 金 | 王 | 金 | 銀 | 桂 | 香 | 1 |
| | | | | | | | 角 | | 2 |
| 歩 | | 歩 | 歩 | 歩 | 歩 | 歩 | | 歩 | 3 |
| | | | | | | | 歩 | | 4 |
| | | | | | | | | | 5 |
| | 飛 | | | | | | | | 6 |
| 歩 | | 歩 | 歩 | 歩 | 歩 | 歩 | | 歩 | 7 |
| | 角 | 金 | | | | | 飛 | | 8 |
| 香 | 桂 | 銀 | | 玉 | 金 | 銀 | 桂 | 香 | 9 |

☗ pieces in hand: 歩
5. ...Px24

After White attacks 87 and the subsequent pawn exchange, joseki recommends that Black start a counterattack at the head of White's bishop (23) by the rook pawn rather than trying to defensively attack White's rook. (The reason for this is that White's rook could simply fall back to a floating rook position on 84 thus preventing Black from making a pawn exchange on the second file and then controlling the flow of the game.)

After Black's counterattack, White will capture Black's pawn.

Bishop Trap
up to move 11
☖ pieces in hand: 歩歩

| 9 | 8 | 7 | 6 | 5 | 4 | 3 | 2 | 1 |
| 香 | 桂 | 銀 | 金 | 王 | 金 | 銀 | 桂 | 香 | 1 |
| | | | | | | | 角 | | 2 |
| 歩 | | 歩 | 歩 | 歩 | 歩 | 歩 | 歩 | 歩 | 3 |
| | | | | | | | 歩 | | 4 |
| | | | | | | | | | 5 |
| | 飛 | | | | | | | | 6 |
| 歩 | | 歩 | 歩 | 歩 | 歩 | 歩 | | 歩 | 7 |
| | 角 | 金 | | | | | 飛 | | 8 |
| 香 | 桂 | 銀 | | 玉 | 金 | 銀 | 桂 | 香 | 9 |

☗ pieces in hand: –
6. P*23!

Bishop Trap
up to move 13
☖ pieces in hand: 歩

| 9 | 8 | 7 | 6 | 5 | 4 | 3 | 2 | 1 |
| 香 | 桂 | 銀 | 金 | 王 | 金 | 銀 | 桂 | 香 | 1 |
| | | | | | | | と | | 2 |
| 歩 | | 歩 | 歩 | 歩 | 歩 | 歩 | | 歩 | 3 |
| | | | | | | | 歩 | | 4 |
| | | | | | | | | | 5 |
| | 飛 | | | | | | | | 6 |
| 歩 | 歩 | 歩 | 歩 | 歩 | 歩 | 歩 | | 歩 | 7 |
| | 角 | 金 | | | | | 飛 | | 8 |
| 香 | 桂 | 銀 | | 玉 | 金 | 銀 | 桂 | 香 | 9 |

☗ pieces in hand: 角
6. ...P*87
7. Px22+

This pawn capture by White allows Black to drop a pawn (obtained from the eighth file pawn exchange) at the head of White's bishop.

White can follow suit and also drop a pawn at the head of Black's bishop.

But, Black captures White's bishop first.

Bishop Trap
up to move 14
☖ pieces in hand: 歩歩

| 9 | 8 | 7 | 6 | 5 | 4 | 3 | 2 | 1 |
| 香 | 桂 | 銀 | 金 | 王 | 金 | | 桂 | 香 | 1 |
| | | | | | | | 銀 | | 2 |
| 歩 | | 歩 | 歩 | 歩 | 歩 | 歩 | | 歩 | 3 |
| | | | | | | | 歩 | | 4 |
| | | | | | | | | | 5 |
| | 飛 | | | | | | | | 6 |
| 歩 | 歩 | 歩 | 歩 | 歩 | 歩 | 歩 | | 歩 | 7 |
| | 角 | 金 | | | | | 飛 | | 8 |
| 香 | 桂 | 銀 | | 玉 | 金 | 銀 | 桂 | 香 | 9 |

☗ pieces in hand: 角
7. ...Sx22
Rook–Pawn Fork
up to move 15
☖ pieces in hand: 歩歩

| 9 | 8 | 7 | 6 | 5 | 4 | 3 | 2 | 1 |
| 香 | 桂 | 銀 | 金 | 王 | 金 | | 桂 | 香 | 1 |
| | | | | | | | 銀 | | 2 |
| 歩 | | 歩 | 歩 | 歩 | 歩 | 歩 | | 歩 | 3 |
| | | | | | | | 歩 | | 4 |
| | | 角 | | | | | | | 5 |
| | 飛 | | | | | | | | 6 |
| 歩 | 歩 | 歩 | 歩 | 歩 | 歩 | 歩 | | 歩 | 7 |
| | 角 | 金 | | | | | 飛 | | 8 |
| 香 | 桂 | 銀 | | 玉 | 金 | 銀 | 桂 | 香 | 9 |

☗ pieces in hand: –
8. B*75

After White recaptures Black's tokin on the second file, Black drops the bishop on 75 creating a rook–pawn fork.

(Although it's possible that Black could also protect their bishop by capturing White's pawn with their gold [8. Gx77], this is a bad move since White's rook will be able to promote after taking Black's gold [8. ...Rx77+].)

White now has a choice between retreating their rook back to their camp at 82 or attacking Black's bishop.

Bishop Promotion
up to move 17
☖ pieces in hand: 歩歩

| 9 | 8 | 7 | 6 | 5 | 4 | 3 | 2 | 1 |
| 香 | 桂 | 銀 | 金 | 王 | 金 | | 桂 | 香 | 1 |
| | | | | | | | 銀 | | 2 |
| 歩 | | 歩 | 歩 | 馬 | 歩 | 歩 | | 歩 | 3 |
| | | | | | | | 歩 | | 4 |
| | 飛 | | | | | | | | 5 |
| | | | | | | | | | 6 |
| 歩 | 歩 | 歩 | 歩 | 歩 | 歩 | 歩 | | 歩 | 7 |
| | 角 | 金 | | | | | 飛 | | 8 |
| 香 | 桂 | 銀 | | 玉 | 金 | 銀 | 桂 | 香 | 9 |

☗ pieces in hand: 歩
8. ...R-85
9. Bx53+
Bishop Sidestep
up to move 19
☖ pieces in hand: 歩歩

| 9 | 8 | 7 | 6 | 5 | 4 | 3 | 2 | 1 |
| 香 | 桂 | 銀 | 金 | 王 | 金 | | 桂 | 香 | 1 |
| | | | | | | | 銀 | | 2 |
| 歩 | | 歩 | 歩 | | 馬 | 歩 | | 歩 | 3 |
| | | | | | | | 歩 | | 4 |
| | | | | 飛 | | | | | 5 |
| | | | | | | | | | 6 |
| 歩 | 歩 | 歩 | 歩 | 歩 | 歩 | 歩 | | 歩 | 7 |
| | 角 | 金 | | | | | 飛 | | 8 |
| 香 | 桂 | 銀 | | 玉 | 金 | 銀 | 桂 | 香 | 9 |

☗ pieces in hand: 歩歩
9. ...R-55+
10. +Bx43

If the bishop on 75 is attacked (as shown here, R-85), then Black will promote their bishop on fifth file.

White's rook can continue to attack the bishop (R-55), but Black can continue eluding capture with a sidestep to the fourth file.

Black Gains Knight
up to move 23
☖ pieces in hand: 歩歩歩歩

| 9 | 8 | 7 | 6 | 5 | 4 | 3 | 2 | 1 |
| 香 | 桂 | 銀 | 金 | 王 | 金 | | 馬 | 香 | 1 |
| | | | | | | | 銀 | | 2 |
| 歩 | | 歩 | 歩 | | | 歩 | | 歩 | 3 |
| | | | | | | | 歩 | | 4 |
| | | | | | | | | | 5 |
| | | | | | | | | | 6 |
| 歩 | 歩 | 歩 | 歩 | | 龍 | 歩 | | 歩 | 7 |
| | 角 | 金 | | 歩 | | | 飛 | | 8 |
| 香 | 桂 | 銀 | | 玉 | 金 | 銀 | 桂 | 香 | 9 |

☗ pieces in hand: 桂歩
10. ...+Rx57

11. P*58 +Rx47

12. +Bx21

White's rook can now promote (R-57+), but Black can defend their king with a pawn drop (P*58).

White can capture another pawn (+Rx47), but Black can gain a knight (+Bx21).

This position is thought to still favor Black.

==== Blunder: Inferiority of silver ====
Silver Defense
position after 6 moves
☖ pieces in hand: –

| 9 | 8 | 7 | 6 | 5 | 4 | 3 | 2 | 1 |
| 香 | 桂 | 銀 | 金 | 王 | 金 | 銀 | 桂 | 香 | 1 |
| | 飛 | | | | | | 角 | | 2 |
| 歩 | | 歩 | 歩 | 歩 | 歩 | 歩 | 歩 | 歩 | 3 |
| | | | | | | | | | 4 |
| | 歩 | | | | | | 歩 | | 5 |
| | | | | | | | | | 6 |
| 歩 | 歩 | 歩 | 歩 | 歩 | 歩 | 歩 | | 歩 | 7 |
| | 角 | 銀 | | | | | 飛 | | 8 |
| 香 | 桂 | | 金 | 玉 | 金 | 銀 | 桂 | 香 | 9 |

☗ pieces in hand: –
3. S-78?
Silver Defense
position after 7 moves
☖ pieces in hand: –

| 9 | 8 | 7 | 6 | 5 | 4 | 3 | 2 | 1 |
| 香 | 桂 | 銀 | 金 | 王 | 金 | 銀 | 桂 | 香 | 1 |
| | 飛 | | | | | | 角 | | 2 |
| 歩 | | 歩 | 歩 | 歩 | 歩 | | 歩 | 歩 | 3 |
| | | | | | | 歩 | | | 4 |
| | 歩 | | | | | | 歩 | | 5 |
| | | | | | | | | | 6 |
| 歩 | 歩 | 歩 | 歩 | 歩 | 歩 | 歩 | | 歩 | 7 |
| | 角 | 銀 | | | | | 飛 | | 8 |
| 香 | 桂 | | 金 | 玉 | 金 | 銀 | 桂 | 香 | 9 |

☗ pieces in hand: –
3. ...P-34

Using a silver to defend the head of the bishop is considered a bad formation (悪形 akukei) even though it appears somewhat similar in that the silver can defend the head of the bishop. However, a silver cannot defend from the sides leaving the bishop without any direct connection to a defending piece. For instance, in the adjacent diagram, Black moves the left silver beside the bishop to prepare for White's attack from their advancing rook pawn. Due to Black's poor bishop–silver formation, White will now open their bishop's diagonal to take advantage of this situation.

Bishop Capture
position after 9 moves
☖ pieces in hand: 角

| 9 | 8 | 7 | 6 | 5 | 4 | 3 | 2 | 1 |
| 香 | 桂 | 銀 | 金 | 王 | 金 | 銀 | 桂 | 香 | 1 |
| | 飛 | | | | | | | | 2 |
| 歩 | | 歩 | 歩 | 歩 | 歩 | | 歩 | 歩 | 3 |
| | | | | | | 歩 | | | 4 |
| | 歩 | | | | | | 歩 | | 5 |
| | | 歩 | | | | | | | 6 |
| 歩 | 歩 | | 歩 | 歩 | 歩 | 歩 | | 歩 | 7 |
| | 馬 | 銀 | | | | | 飛 | | 8 |
| 香 | 桂 | | 金 | 玉 | 金 | 銀 | 桂 | 香 | 9 |

☗ pieces in hand: –
4. P-76? Bx88+!

This move by White also prevents Black from opening their diagonal since doing so would lead to White capturing Black's bishop without penalty. Furthermore, this position cannot be easily repaired since Black's silver cannot retreat to its original position.

=== Further strategy branches ===
Double Wing Attack
position up move 10
☖ pieces in hand: –

| 9 | 8 | 7 | 6 | 5 | 4 | 3 | 2 | 1 |
| 香 | 桂 | 銀 | 金 | 王 | | 銀 | 桂 | 香 | 1 |
| | 飛 | | | | | 金 | 角 | | 2 |
| 歩 | | 歩 | 歩 | 歩 | 歩 | 歩 | 歩 | 歩 | 3 |
| | | | | | | | 飛 | | 4 |
| | 歩 | | | | | | | | 5 |
| | | | | | | | | | 6 |
| 歩 | 歩 | 歩 | 歩 | 歩 | 歩 | 歩 | | 歩 | 7 |
| | 角 | 金 | | | | | | | 8 |
| 香 | 桂 | 銀 | | 玉 | 金 | 銀 | 桂 | 香 | 9 |

☗ pieces in hand: 歩

After move 10 of Double Wing Attack, the joseki branches off into different variants depending on which square the rook moves down to.

In the Floating Rook variant, the rook moves to 26.

In the Retreating Rook variant, the rook returns to 28.

==== Retreating Rook ====
Retreating Rook
position after 11 moves
☖ pieces in hand: –

| 9 | 8 | 7 | 6 | 5 | 4 | 3 | 2 | 1 |
| 香 | 桂 | 銀 | 金 | 王 | | 銀 | 桂 | 香 | 1 |
| | 飛 | | | | | 金 | 角 | | 2 |
| 歩 | | 歩 | 歩 | 歩 | 歩 | 歩 | 歩 | 歩 | 3 |
| | | | | | | | | | 4 |
| | 歩 | | | | | | | | 5 |
| | | | | | | | | | 6 |
| 歩 | 歩 | 歩 | 歩 | 歩 | 歩 | 歩 | | 歩 | 7 |
| | 角 | 金 | | | | | 飛 | | 8 |
| 香 | 桂 | 銀 | | 玉 | 金 | 銀 | 桂 | 香 | 9 |

☗ pieces in hand: 歩
6. R-28

Retreating Rook (引き飛車 hikihisha) is an opening following the Double Wing opening proper in which Black's rook retreats all the way back to their camp allowing White to also exchange rook pawns.

==== Floating Rook ====
Floating Rook
position after 11 moves
☖ pieces in hand: –

| 9 | 8 | 7 | 6 | 5 | 4 | 3 | 2 | 1 |
| 香 | 桂 | 銀 | 金 | 王 | | 銀 | 桂 | 香 | 1 |
| | 飛 | | | | | 金 | 角 | | 2 |
| 歩 | | 歩 | 歩 | 歩 | 歩 | 歩 | 歩 | 歩 | 3 |
| | | | | | | | | | 4 |
| | 歩 | | | | | | | | 5 |
| | | | | | | | 飛 | | 6 |
| 歩 | 歩 | 歩 | 歩 | 歩 | 歩 | 歩 | | 歩 | 7 |
| | 角 | 金 | | | | | | | 8 |
| 香 | 桂 | 銀 | | 玉 | 金 | 銀 | 桂 | 香 | 9 |

☗ pieces in hand: 歩
6. R-26

In contrast to the Retreating Rook variant of Double Wing Attack, Floating Rook (浮き飛車) aims to protect rank 6 and prevent White from exchanging pawns on the eighth file to get a pawn in hand.

The translated term floating is synonymous with the term hanging as in hanging piece used in western chess where floating means a piece that is not defended by another piece.

===== Tsukada Special =====
A Floating Rook variant of Double Wing Attack developed by Yasuaki Tsukada. The strategy is characterized by an aggressive offense at a very early stage of the game and a particular positioning of Black's rook on the 24 square after a pawn exchange initiated by Black dropping a pawn on 24.

===== Twisting Rook =====
After retreating the rook in Double Wing, the rook switches to a Ranging Rook position. Kozo Masuda and others developed the joseki.

===== Kusarigama Silver =====
In Kusarigama Silver (Japanese: 鎖鎌銀, romanized: kusarigama-gin), from a Reclining Silver position, the silver moves to S-36 instead of S-56. Also called Reckless Silver (Japanese: 猪突銀, romanized: chototsu-gin), the name refers to the movements of rook and silver resembling those of a kusarigama, the sickle-and-chain Japanese weapon,

===== UFO Silver =====
The UFO Silver (Japanese: UFO銀, romanized: UFO-gin) variation of Double Wing involves Black sending out the right silver after retreating the rook to R-28. Unlike the typical Climbing Silver, though, the silver is moved first to S-27 and then to S-36.

==== Old Double Wing opening ====
Old Double Wing with central pawn pushes
☖ pieces in hand: 歩

| 9 | 8 | 7 | 6 | 5 | 4 | 3 | 2 | 1 |
| 香 | 桂 | | 金 | | 王 | 銀 | 桂 | 香 | 1 |
| | 飛 | | 銀 | | | 金 | 角 | | 2 |
| 歩 | | 歩 | 歩 | | 歩 | | 歩 | 歩 | 3 |
| | | | | 歩 | | 歩 | | | 4 |
| | | | | | | | | | 5 |
| | | 歩 | | 歩 | | | 飛 | | 6 |
| 歩 | 歩 | | 歩 | | 歩 | 歩 | | 歩 | 7 |
| | 角 | 金 | | 金 | 銀 | | | | 8 |
| 香 | 桂 | 銀 | 玉 | | | | 桂 | 香 | 9 |

☗ pieces in hand: 歩
Typically, Black uses a Floating Rook position while White uses a Retreating Rook position.

The Old Double Wing (旧型相掛かり or 旧型相懸り) is rarely seen presently. However, it was the Double Wing variation used up until a little after World War II and early versions of it were used starting from 1625. After the initial opening sequence, unlike modern Double Wing, it is characterized by both players pushing the central pawns (P-56 and ...P-54) supported by a right (attacking) silver behind the central pawn (that is, S-57 and S-53). The Old Double Wing opening became obsolete after central pawn push strategies were replaced by pushing pawns on the fourth file with the Reclining Silver strategy (sixth file for White).

A joseki for the Old Double Wing opening is the Silver Three Pawn joseki (銀歩三定跡).

== Open bishop diagonal variation ==
Open Diagonal
up to move 2
☖ pieces in hand: –

| 9 | 8 | 7 | 6 | 5 | 4 | 3 | 2 | 1 |
| 香 | 桂 | 銀 | 金 | 王 | 金 | 銀 | 桂 | 香 | 1 |
| | 飛 | | | | | | 角 | | 2 |
| 歩 | 歩 | 歩 | 歩 | 歩 | 歩 | | 歩 | 歩 | 3 |
| | | | | | | 歩 | | | 4 |
| | | | | | | | | | 5 |
| | | 歩 | | | | | | | 6 |
| 歩 | 歩 | | 歩 | 歩 | 歩 | 歩 | 歩 | 歩 | 7 |
| | 角 | | | | | | 飛 | | 8 |
| 香 | 桂 | 銀 | 金 | 玉 | 金 | 銀 | 桂 | 香 | 9 |

☗ pieces in hand: –
Open Diagonal
up to move 6
☖ pieces in hand: –

| 9 | 8 | 7 | 6 | 5 | 4 | 3 | 2 | 1 |
| 香 | 桂 | 銀 | 金 | 王 | 金 | 銀 | 桂 | 香 | 1 |
| | 飛 | | | | | | 角 | | 2 |
| 歩 | | 歩 | 歩 | 歩 | 歩 | | 歩 | 歩 | 3 |
| | | | | | | 歩 | | | 4 |
| | 歩 | | | | | | 歩 | | 5 |
| | | 歩 | | | | | | | 6 |
| 歩 | 歩 | | 歩 | 歩 | 歩 | 歩 | | 歩 | 7 |
| | 角 | | | | | | 飛 | | 8 |
| 香 | 桂 | 銀 | 金 | 玉 | 金 | 銀 | 桂 | 香 | 9 |

☗ pieces in hand: –

1. P-77. Black opens their bishop diagonal. This is the most flexible first move.

1. ...P-34. White responds by opening their bishop diagonal as well.

This variation of Double Wing with both players' bishop diagonals open from the start is a much less common way to play Double Wing. More often than not, this positioning accompanied by dual double rook pawn pushes will lead to a Side Pawn Capture opening or a Tempo Loss Bishop Exchange opening. However, hundreds of years ago, this positioning with all major pieces activated was very typical of the Double Wing Attack. Furthermore, accepting the side pawn gambit was considered a poor move (thus, Side Pawn Capture openings were uncommon) and the modern Tempo Loss Bishop Exchange had not been invented yet.

2. P-24 P-84. Both players give an early indication of choosing a Static Rook opening by advancing their rook pawns. Thus, the game will likely be a Double Static Rook opening.

3. P-25 P-85. Both continue their rook pawn advances to the middle rank 5. Thus, the likelihood of a Double Static Rook game increases.

Open Diagonal
up to move 8
☖ pieces in hand: –

| 9 | 8 | 7 | 6 | 5 | 4 | 3 | 2 | 1 |
| 香 | 桂 | 銀 | 金 | 王 | | 銀 | 桂 | 香 | 1 |
| | 飛 | | | | | 金 | 角 | | 2 |
| 歩 | | 歩 | 歩 | 歩 | 歩 | | 歩 | 歩 | 3 |
| | | | | | | 歩 | | | 4 |
| | 歩 | | | | | | 歩 | | 5 |
| | | 歩 | | | | | | | 6 |
| 歩 | 歩 | | 歩 | 歩 | 歩 | 歩 | | 歩 | 7 |
| | 角 | 金 | | | | | 飛 | | 8 |
| 香 | 桂 | 銀 | | 玉 | 金 | 銀 | 桂 | 香 | 9 |

☗ pieces in hand: –
Open Diagonal
up to move 9
☖ pieces in hand: –

| 9 | 8 | 7 | 6 | 5 | 4 | 3 | 2 | 1 |
| 香 | 桂 | 銀 | 金 | 王 | | 銀 | 桂 | 香 | 1 |
| | 飛 | | | | | 金 | 角 | | 2 |
| 歩 | | 歩 | 歩 | 歩 | 歩 | | 歩 | 歩 | 3 |
| | | | | | | 歩 | 歩 | | 4 |
| | 歩 | | | | | | | | 5 |
| | | 歩 | | | | | | | 6 |
| 歩 | 歩 | | 歩 | 歩 | 歩 | 歩 | | 歩 | 7 |
| | 角 | 金 | | | | | 飛 | | 8 |
| 香 | 桂 | 銀 | | 玉 | 金 | 銀 | 桂 | 香 | 9 |

☗ pieces in hand: –

4. G-78. Black moves their left gold to the seventh file protecting the 88 square from a later possible bishop attack and protecting the 87 square in preparation for White pawn exchange on that file.

4. ...G-32. White mirrors Black's move for the same reasons.

Both players have symmetrical positions.

== See also ==
- Shogi opening
- Shogi strategy and tactics

== Bibliography ==
- Aono, Teruichi (2009) [1983]. Better moves for better shogi. Translated by Fairbairn, John (2nd ed.). Ishi Press. ISBN 978-4-87187-999-6.
- Aono, Teruichi (1983). Guide to shogi openings: Unlock the secrets of joseki 将棋定跡のカギ: 和英 定跡問題集. Translated by Fairbairn, John. 山海堂. ISBN 4-381-00598-8.
- Fairbairn, John (1980). "How to play the centre game part 1". Shogi (27): 17–18.
- Fairbairn, John (1980). "How to play the centre game part 2". Shogi (28): 14–15.
- Hosking, Tony (1996). The art of shogi. The Shogi Foundation. ISBN 978-0-95310-890-9.
- 泉, 正樹 [Izumi, Masaki] (1988). 相掛かりガイド. 毎日コミュニケーションズ. ISBN 4-89563-528-7.
- 加藤, 治郎 [Katō, Jirō] (1992) [1970]. 将棋は歩から: 上巻. 東京書店. ISBN 4-88574-409-1.
- Kitao, Madoka (2011). Joseki at a glance. Translated by Kawasaki, Tomohide. Nekomado. ISBN 978-4-9052-2501-0.
